= List of lakes of the St. Johns River =

This is the list of lakes that form the St. Johns River in Florida, the state's longest river, starting with the origin.

- Blue Cypress Lake
- Lake Hell 'n Blazes
- Sawgrass Lake
- Lake Washington
- Lake Winder
- Lake Poinsett
- Ruth Lake
- Puzzle Lake
- Lake Harney
- Lake Jesup
- Lake Monroe
- Lake Dexter
- Lake George
- Doctors Lake-linked by channel

== See also ==
- Atlantic Ocean
