= Lake Poinsett (Florida) =

Lake in Florida, U.S.

- Location within Florida Location within the United States
- Location: Brevard / Orange / Osceola counties, near Cocoa, Florida, U.S.
- Coordinates: 28°20′N 80°49′W
- Primary inflows: Taylor Creek, St. Johns River
- Primary outflows: St. Johns River
- Basin countries: United States
- Max. length: 2.74 miles (4.41 km)
- Max. width: 5.43 miles (8.74 km)
- Surface area: 4,334 acres (18 km^{2})
- Surface elevation: 13 feet (4 m)
- Islands: Various islands and islets

Lake Poinsett is a lake in Brevard County, Florida, United States, near Rockledge and Cocoa, with small portions in Orange County and Osceola County. It is the second-largest lake in Brevard County, after Lake Washington, though it is actually the smallest lake in Osceola County. It is the widest lake in Brevard County, with a distance of 5 miles (8 km) at its widest point. At the eastern portion of the lake, a channel connects the lake to Lake Florence and Barnett Lake.

Lake Poinsett and all the other lakes flow northward as part of the St. Johns River system.

It is where the Saint Johns River runs along county lines north of the lake. It is part of the St. Johns River Water Management District. At the extreme northwest corner of Lake Poinsett is Taylor Creek, a tributary of the St. Johns River.

The lake is named for Joel Roberts Poinsett, a diplomat who brought the poinsettia to the United States.

== Nearby places and roads ==
- County Road 532
- State Road 520
- Interstate 95
- Tucker Lane
- Cocoa West
- Cocoa
- Rockledge
- Canaveral Groves
- Lake Poinsett Road
- Providence Ave.
- Bird Island
- Robin Island Amber Lane
- Angler Drive

=== Poinsett Shores ===
Poinsett Shores & Poinsett Acres are a boating community located on the northeastern side of Lake Poinsett, at the southern end of former State Road 520A (Lake Poinsett Road). It is one of two communities that surround Lake Poinsett, the other being WoodMoore Estates on the east-northeastern shore. The community is about one and a half square miles.

== History ==
250,000 fish were killed in July 2002, when a heavy rainstorm washed in phosphorus-rich runoff from lawns in the area as well as from septic tanks.

== See also ==
- St. Johns River
- Lake Washington
- Ruth Lake: next lake downriver
- Lake Winder: next lake upriver
