= Sawgrass Lake (Brevard County, Florida) =

Lake in Brevard County, Florida, United States

- Location within Florida Location within the United States
- Location: Brevard County, Florida, United States
- Coordinates: 28°04′30″N 80°46′41″W
- Type: lake
- Settlements: West Melbourne, Florida

Sawgrass Lake is a lake in Brevard County, Florida, United States. It is one of the lakes that form the St. Johns River. The lake is usually accessed by boat from a ramp located on U.S. Route 192 on the west shore of the St. Johns River. The lake is located near the river's headwaters, and the size of the lake is limited by the low velocity of the river at this point. It is only 4 miles (6.4 km) in diameter with a surface area of less than 1,000 acres (4 km^{2}). The lake is only 3 miles (4.8 km) upstream from Lake Washington, the county's largest lake. Governed by the St. Johns Water Management District.

== Little Sawgrass Lake ==
Little Sawgrass Lake is close to the larger Sawgrass Lake, only 0.1 miles (0.16 km) away (28°04′30″N 80°46′41″W.). The westernmost point is slightly west of the bigger lake. It also has a surface area under 1,000 acres (4 km^{2}), and is almost 2 miles (3.2 km) in diameter.

== See also ==
- U.S. Route 192
- Palm Bay
- Lake Washington-next lake downriver
- Lake Hell 'n Blazes-next lake upriver
