= Lake Washington (Florida) =

Lake in the state of Florida, United States

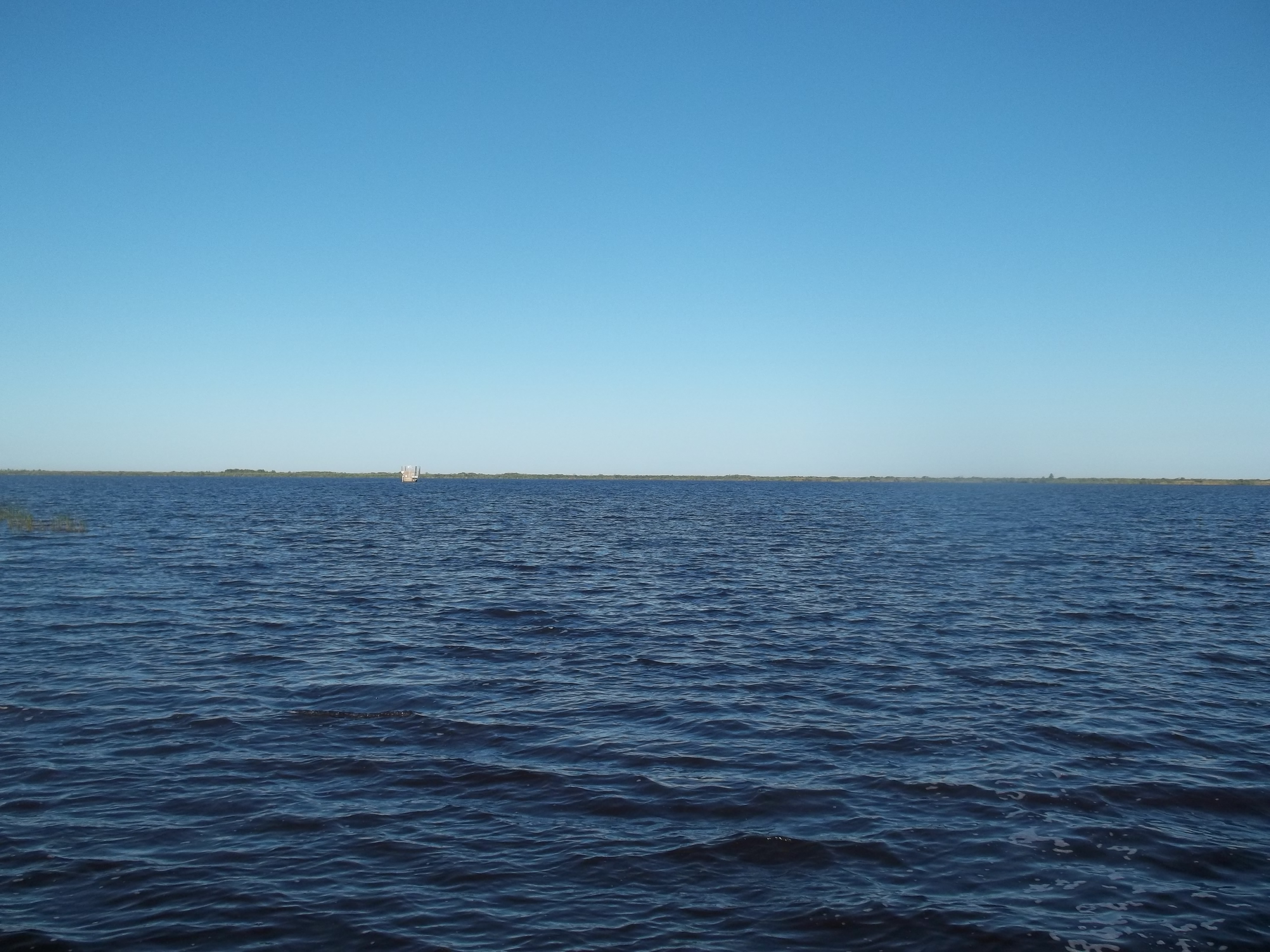

- Location within Florida Location within the United States
- Location: Brevard County, Florida
- Coordinates: 28°09′10″N 80°44′34″W
- Primary inflows: St. Johns River
- Primary outflows: St. Johns River
- Basin countries: United States
- Surface area: 4,362 acres (17.65 km^{2})
- Surface elevation: 16 ft (4.9 m)

Lake Washington
- Location within the United States
- Location: Brevard County, Florida, United States
- Nearest city: Melbourne, Florida
- Coordinates: 28°09′10″N 80°44′34″W
- Area: 4,362 acres (1,765 ha)
- Governing body: St. Johns Water Management District

Lake Washington is the largest lake in Brevard County, Florida, United States, at 4,362 acres (17.65 km^{2}). The lake may have been named for the U.S. Deputy Surveyor Colonel Henry Washington, after he surveyed the area in 1844.

== Hydrology ==
It is the 41st largest lake in the state of Florida. It is approximately 4 by 1 mile (6.4 by 1.6 km) and 10 to 15 feet (3.0 to 4.6 m) deep.

Located adjacent to the City of Melbourne, it is the single most important source of fresh water for the city and the surrounding areas. It furnishes two-thirds of the water to Melbourne's 150,000 customers.

The John A. Buckley Surface Water Treatment Plant is located nearby. It is owned by the City of Melbourne and furnishes it, and other cities, with potable water. The water main is 36 inches (910 mm) in diameter.

It is one of the lakes that make up the St. Johns River system. Further downstream is the neighboring Lake Winder.

== Economy ==
Exit 183 off Interstate 95 provides access to the lake.

At the dead end of Lake Washington Road is Lake Washington Park, where boating is permitted. The park contains a playground and pavilions for parties.

== Nearby cities ==
- Melbourne
- West Melbourne
- Melbourne Village
- Palm Bay

== See also ==
Media related to Lake Washington (Florida) at Wikimedia Commons

- List of lakes of the St. Johns River
- Lake Winder, the next lake downstream
- Sawgrass Lake, the next lake upstream
