= Lake Winder =

Lake in the state of Florida, United States

- Location within Florida Location within the United States
- Location: Brevard county, near Viera, Florida
- Coordinates: 28°14′35″N 80°51′41″W
- Primary inflows: St. Johns River
- Primary outflows: St. Johns River
- Basin countries: United States
- Max. length: 2.51 miles (4.04 km)
- Max. width: 1.29 mi (2.08 km)
- Surface area: 1,496 acres (6 km^{2})
- Surface elevation: 13 feet (4 m)

Lake Winder is a 1,496-acre (6 km^{2}) lake in Brevard County, located in the River Lakes Conservation Area. The lake was named after U.S. Army Captain Edward Winder. Early in 1838 Winder was assigned to scout the area for Seminoles. He discovered Lake Poinsett. The smaller lake to the south was named after Winder. The nearest settlement is unincorporated Viera, Florida, 5 miles (8.0 km) to the east. It's the third largest lake in Brevard County. It is part of the St. Johns River system and governed by the St. Johns River Water Management District.

== Geography ==
Lake Winder is at 28°14′35″N 80°51′41″W. It is located approximately between US 192 and the Beachline. The lake is located 5 miles (8 km) upstream (south) of Lake Poinsett. The waterway to it is navigable. It is located downstream (north) of Lake Washington, FL. The St. Johns River flows north.

About 2 miles (3 km) to the west is CR 419.

It is accessible only by boat from the north and south on the St. Johns River, as well as by two canals from the Viera area.
