= St. Johns River =

Longest river in Florida, United States

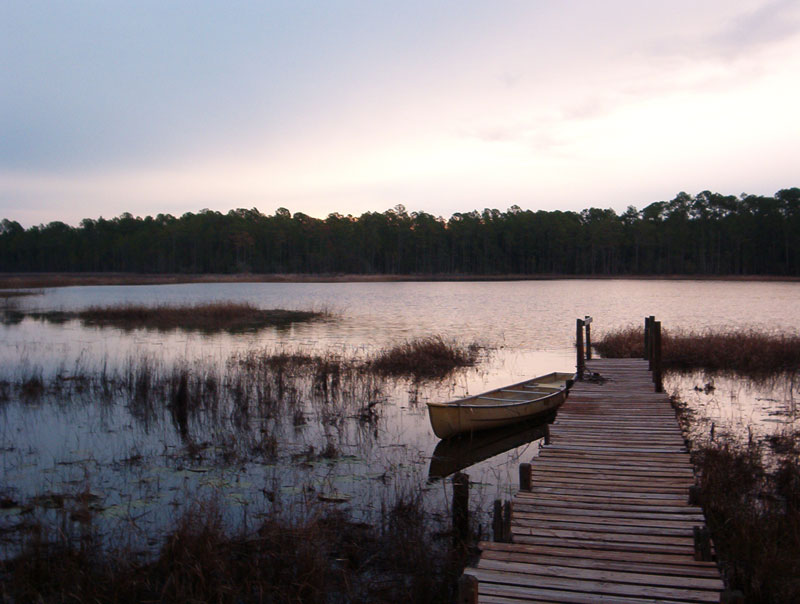
- St. Johns River near Astor

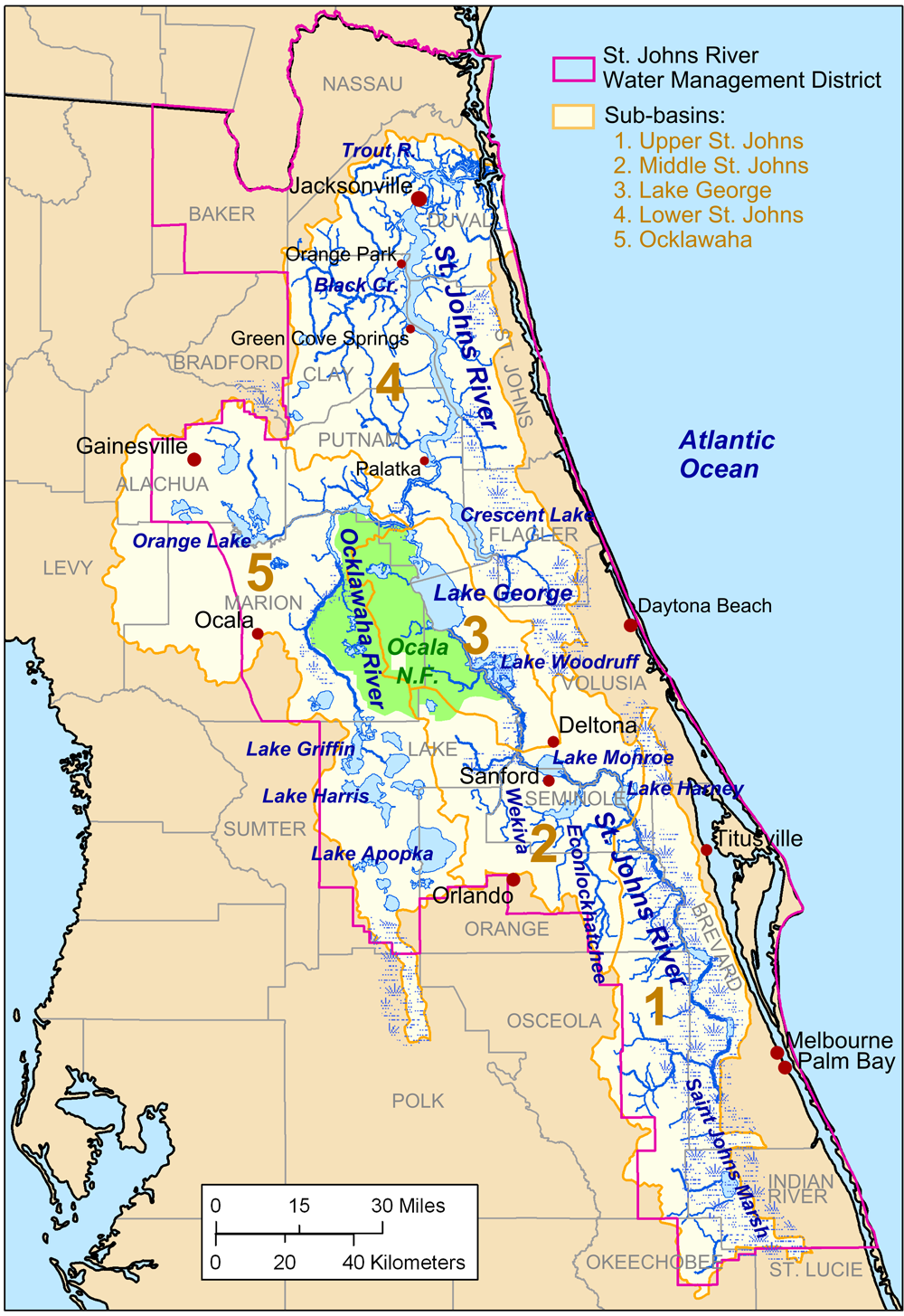
- St. Johns River surrounding with corresponding watersheds designated by the St. Johns River Water Management District: 1. Upper basin, 2. Middle basin, 3. Lake George basin, 4. Lower basin, 5. Ocklawaha River basin
- Etymology: Spanish: San Juan del Puerto

Location
- Country: United States
- State: Florida
- Cities: Sanford, DeBary, Deltona, DeLand, Palatka, Green Cove Springs, Orange Park, Jacksonville

Physical characteristics
- Source: St. Johns Marsh
  - location: near Vero Beach, Indian River County, Florida
  - coordinates: 27°57′18″N 80°47′3″W
  - elevation: 30 ft (9.1 m)
- Mouth: Atlantic Ocean
  - location: Jacksonville, Duval County, Florida
  - coordinates: 30°24′05″N 81°24′3″W
  - elevation: 0 ft (0 m)
- Length: 310 mi (500 km)
- Basin size: 8,840 sq mi (22,900 km^{2})
- Discharge
  - location: Mayport, Florida
  - average: 15,000 cu ft/s (420 m^{3}/s)
  - maximum: 150,000 cu ft/s (4,200 m^{3}/s)

Basin features
- Tributaries
  - left: Mills Creek River, Econlockhatchee River, Wekiva River, Alexander Springs, Salt Springs Run, Ocklawaha River, Rice Creek, Simms Creek, Black Creek, Ortega River, Trout River
  - right: Murphy Creek/Dunn's Creek, Julington Creek, Pottsburg Creek, Intracoastal Waterway/Sisters Creek

The St. Johns River (Spanish: Río San Juan) is the longest river in the U.S. state of Florida and its most significant for commercial and recreational use. (Note: The St. Johns is frequently cited as being a rare north-flowing river in North America (Benke & Chusing, p. 100; Randazzo, p. 12), though most rivers in Canada and in parts of the United States drain north (Verdin, K. L. (March 19, 2010). "A System for Topologically Coding Global Drainage Basins and Stream Networks", ESRI; Gonzalez, M. A. (2003). "Continental Divides in North Dakota and North America", North Dakota Geological Survey Newsletter 30 (1), pp. 1–7; Kamiar, M. (April 27, 2013). "Due North: The St. John's River is One of Many". Metro Jacksonville. Archived from the original on November 17, 2015.).) At 310 miles (500 km) long, it winds through or borders twelve counties, three of which are the state's largest. The drop in elevation from the headwaters to the mouth is less than 30 feet (9 m). Like most Florida waterways, the St. Johns has a very slow flow rate at 0.3 mph (0.13 m/s), and is often described as "lazy". Numerous lakes are formed by the river or flow into it, but as a river its widest point is 3 miles (5 km) across, spanning several miles between Palatka and Jacksonville, the latter being the largest urban area on the river. The narrowest point is in the headwaters, an unnavigable marsh in Indian River County. In all, 3.5 million people live within the various watersheds that feed into the St. Johns River.

With a drainage basin of 8,840 square miles (22,900 km^{2}), the St. Johns is one of the major interior wetlands of Florida. It is separated into three major basins and two associated watersheds for Lake George and the Ocklawaha River, all managed by the St. Johns River Water Management District. Like all waterways in Florida, the St. Johns is fed primarily by rainfall, most of which is immediately deposited into the river and its tributaries as stormwater runoff. Much of the water flowing into the St. Johns also comes from the Floridan aquifer, a natural underground reservoir that serves as the fresh water source for populations living north of St. Petersburg.

The banks of the St. Johns have been populated by Archaic people, Timucua, Mocama, French, Spanish, and British settlers, Seminoles, slaves and freemen, Florida crackers, land developers, tourists, and retirees. The river has been the subject of William Bartram's journals, Marjorie Kinnan Rawlings' books, and Harriet Beecher Stowe's letters home. Although Florida was the location of the first permanent European colony in what would become the United States, it was the last U.S. territory on the east coast to be developed, and it remained an undeveloped frontier into the 20th century. When attention was turned to the state, however, much of the land was rapidly overdeveloped in a national zeal for progress. The St. Johns, like many Florida rivers, was altered to make way for agricultural and residential centers. It suffered severe pollution and human interference that has diminished the ecology in and around the river. It was named one of 14 American Heritage Rivers in 1998 but was included on a list of America's Ten Most Endangered Rivers in 2008. Restoration efforts are underway for the basins around the St. Johns as Florida's population continues to increase.

== Geography ==
Starting in Brevard County and meeting the Atlantic Ocean at Duval County, the St. Johns is Florida's primary commercial and recreational waterway. It flows north from its headwaters, originating in the direction of the Lake Wales Ridge, which is only slightly elevated at 30 feet (9.1 m) above sea level. Because of this low elevation drop, the river has a long backwater. It ebbs and flows with tides that pass through the barrier islands and up the channel. Uniquely, it shares the same regional terrain as the parallel Kissimmee River, although the Kissimmee flows south.

=== Upper basin ===
The river is separated into three basins and two associated watersheds managed by the St. Johns River Water Management District. Because the river flows in a northerly direction, the upper basin is located in the headwaters at its southernmost point. The river begins as a network of marshes in Indian River County, at a point west of Vero Beach aptly named the St. Johns Marsh. It is a blackwater stream, meaning that it is fed primarily by swamps and marshes lying beneath it; water seeps through the sandy soil and collects in a slight valley. The upper basin measures approximately 2,000 square miles (5,200 km^{2}); the St. Johns transforms into a navigable waterway in Brevard County. The river touches on the borders of Osceola and Orange Counties and flows through the southeast tip of Seminole County, transitioning into its middle basin a dozen miles (19 km) or so north of Titusville.

The upper basin was significantly lowered in the 1920s with the establishment of the Melbourne Tillman drainage project. This drained the headwaters eastward to the Indian River through canals dug across the Ten-Mile Ridge near Palm Bay. In 2016 the U.S. Army Corps of Engineers completed a restoration project, returning natural flow to much of the area.

The river is at its narrowest and most unpredictable in this basin. Channel flows are not apparent and are usually unmarked. The most efficient way to travel on this part of the river is by airboat. Approximately 3,500 lakes lie within the watershed; all are shallow, with maximum depths between 3 and 10 feet (1 and 3 m). The river flows into many of the lakes which further confuses navigation. Eight larger lakes and five smaller ones lie in the upper basin; one of the first is named Lake Hell 'n Blazes (sometimes polished to read as Lake Helen or Hellen Blazes), referencing oaths yelled by boatmen and fishermen in the early 19th century, frustrated when trying to navigate through floating islands of macrophytes, or muck and weeds, as the islands changed location with the creeping flow. Lakes Washington, Winder, and Poinsett are located further along this stretch of the river. The northernmost points of the upper basin contain the Tosohatchee Wildlife Management Area, created in 1977 to assist with filtration of waters flowing downstream.

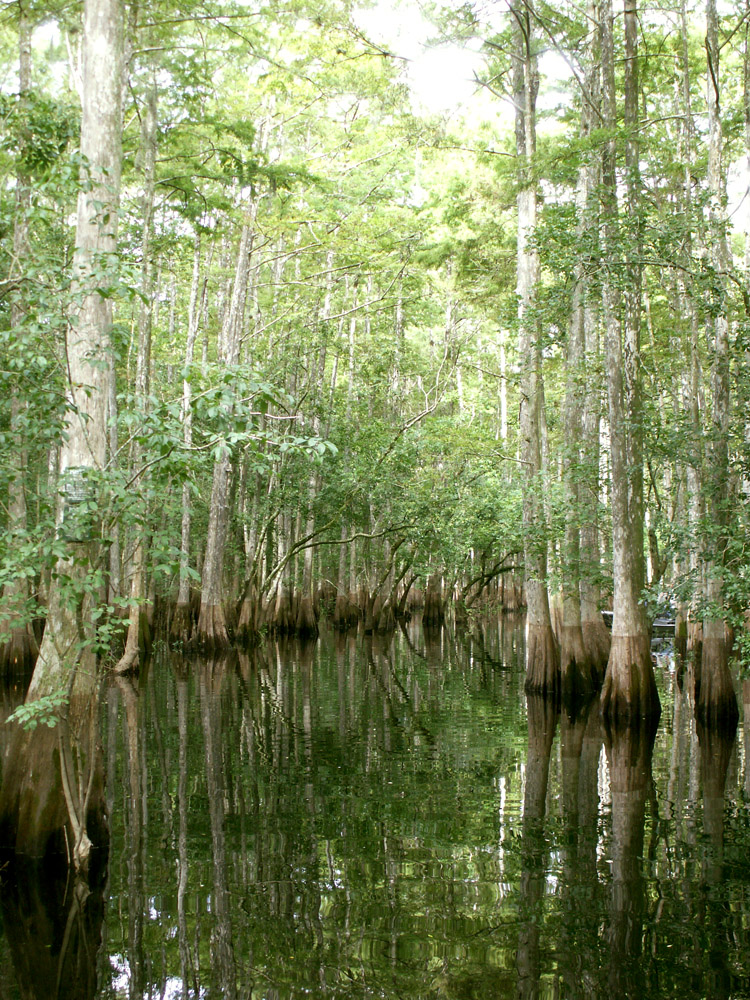
Cypress trees in the Tosohatchee Wildlife Management Area showing dark water marks on the flared trunks, evidence of water level flux

Wetlands in the upper and middle basin are fed by rainwater trapped by the structure of the surrounding land. It is an oxygen- and nutrient-poor environment; what grows usually does so in peat which is created by centuries of decaying plant material. Water levels fluctuate with the subtropical wet and dry seasons. Rain in central and north Florida occurs seasonally during summer and winter, but farther south rain in winter is rare. All plants in these basins must tolerate water fluctuation, both flooding and drought. Sweetbay (Magnolia virginiana), cypress (Taxodium), and swamp tupelo (Nyssa biflora) trees often find great success in this region on raised land called hammocks. Trees that live in water for long periods usually have buttressed trunks, tangled, braided roots, or protrusions like cypress knees to obtain oxygen when under water, but the majority of plant life is aquatic. Wetland staples include the American white waterlily (Nymphaea odorata), pitcher plants, and Virginia iris (Iris virginica). In the southernmost points of the river, Cladium, or sawgrass, grows in vast swaths of wet prairie that at one time extended into the Everglades. These wetland flora are remarkably successful in filtering pollutants that otherwise find their way into the river.

=== Middle basin ===
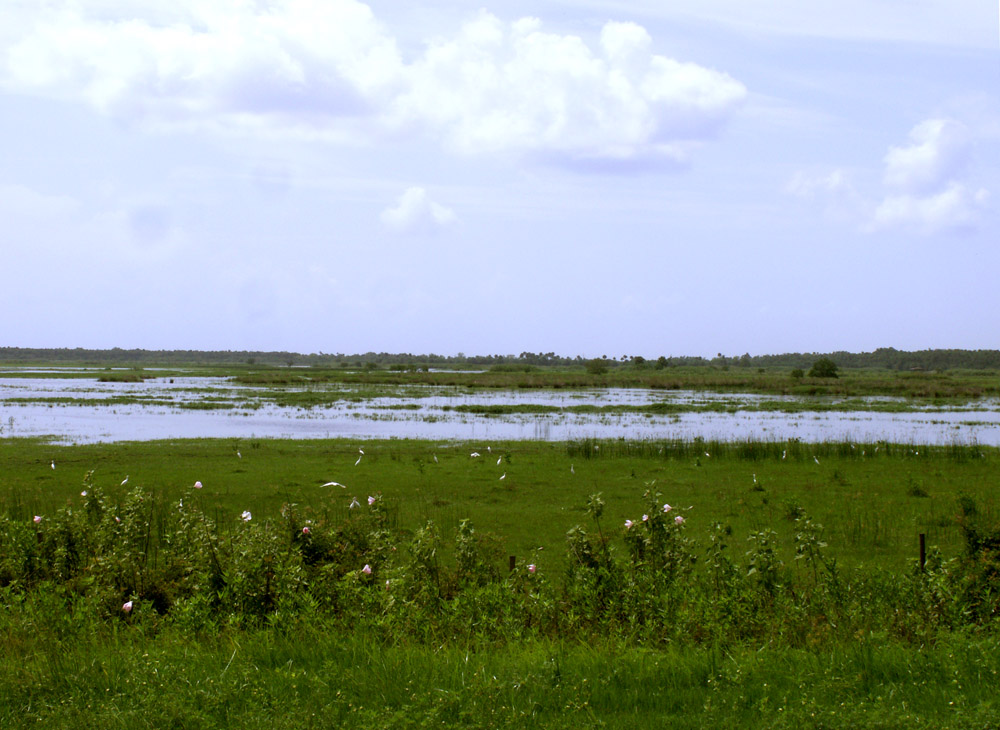
The St. Johns immediately south of Sanford shows a narrow channel with large areas of aquatic plants and wetlands.

For 37 miles (60 km) the river passes through a 1,200-square-mile (3,100 km^{2}) basin fed primarily by springs and stormwater runoff. This basin, spreading throughout Orange, Lake, Volusia, and Seminole Counties, is home to the greater Orlando metropolitan area, where two million people live and major tourist attractions are located. The topography varies between clearly distinguishable banks along the river and broad, shallow lakes. Two of the largest lakes in the middle basin are created by the river: Lake Harney and Lake Monroe. The shallow 9-square-mile (23 km^{2}) Lake Harney is fed by the long narrow Puzzle Lake; immediately north is the Econlockhatchee River, which joins to increase the volume of the St. Johns to where navigation becomes easier for larger boats. The river veers west, touching on Lake Jesup before it empties into Lake Monroe near Sanford. It is at this point that the St. Johns' navigable waterway begins, which is dredged and maintained by the U.S. Army Corps of Engineers with channel markers maintained by the U.S. Coast Guard. Lake Monroe, a large lake at 15 square miles (39 km^{2}) with an average depth of 8 feet (2.4 m), drains a surrounding watershed of 2,420 square miles (6,300 km^{2}).

Optimally an 8-foot (2.4 m) deep channel about 100 yards (91 m) wide after leaving Lake Monroe, the St. Johns meets its most significant tributary in the middle basin, the spring-fed Wekiva River, discharging approximately 42,000,000 US gallons (160,000,000 L) per day into the St. Johns. Forests surrounding the Wekiva River are home to the largest black bear (Ursus americanus floridanus) population in Florida; several troops of Rhesus monkeys (Macaca mulatta) have adapted to live near the river as well. The monkeys' introduction to Florida is unclear; they were reportedly brought either to serve in backdrop scenes of Tarzan movies filmed around the Silver River in the 1930s, or to lend an air of authenticity to "jungle cruises" provided by an enterprising boat operator around the same time.

Springs in Florida stay at an even temperature of 72 °F (22 °C) throughout the year; because of this, Blue Spring is the winter home for West Indian manatees (Trichechus manatus latirostris), and they are protected within Blue Spring State Park. Manatees are large, slow-moving herbivorous aquatic mammals whose primary threats are human development and collisions with swiftly moving watercraft. Many parts of the St. Johns and its tributaries are no-wake zones to protect manatees from being critically or fatally injured by boat propellers. Human interaction with manatees in Blue Spring State Park is forbidden.

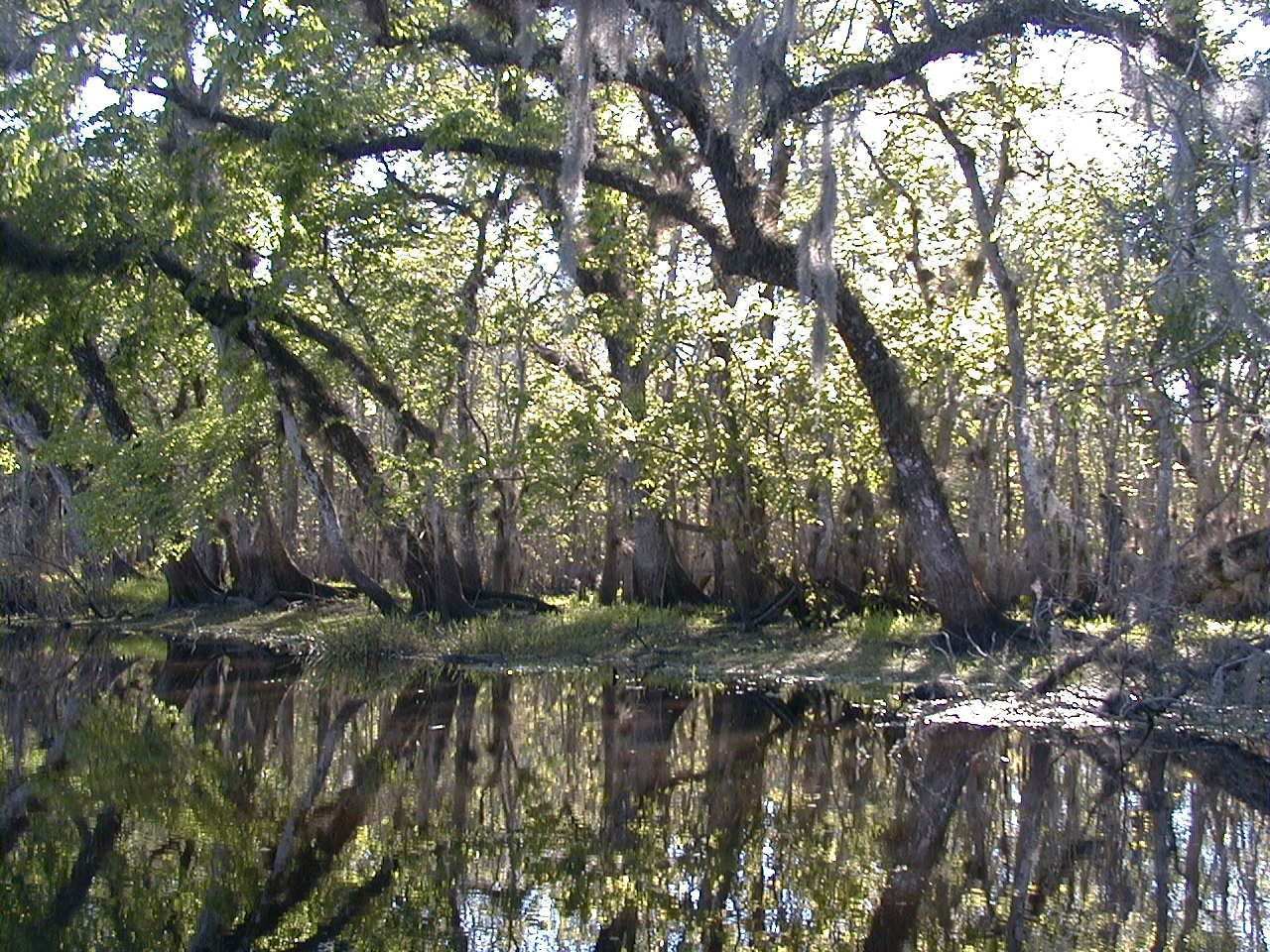
St. Johns River near Blue Spring State Park showing more distinct banks and trees instead of marshes

Of most vital importance to marshes are invertebrate animals, the foundation of food webs. Amphibious invertebrates such as apple snails (Pomacea paludosa), crayfish, and grass shrimp consume plant material, hastening its decomposition and acting as a food source for fish and birds. Insect larvae use water for breeding, feeding upon smaller copepods and amphipods that live in microscopic algae and periphyton formations. Mosquitos, born in water, are in turn the favorite food of 112 species of dragonflies and 44 species of damselflies in Florida. These animals are water hardy and adaptable to dry conditions when water levels fluctuate from one season to the next or through drought and flood cycles.

Of vertebrates, numerous species of frog, salamander, snake, turtle, and alligator (Alligator mississippiensis) proliferate in marsh waters. Most of these animals are active at night. Frog choruses are overwhelming; during alligator mating season the grunts of bulls join in. River otters (Lutra canadensis) can be found through the length of the St. Johns and its tributaries, living in burrows or in the roots of trees bordering waterways. They eat crayfish, turtles, and small fish, and are active usually at night, playful but shy of human contact. The marshes around the upper basin teem with birds. A recent study counted 60,000 birds in one month, nesting or feeding in the upper basin. Wading and water birds like the white ibis (Eudocimus albus), wood stork (Mycteria americana), and purple gallinule (Porphyrio martinicus) depend on the water for raising their young: they prey upon small fish and tadpoles in shallow water and puddles in the dry season. In successful seasons, their colonies can number in the thousands, creating a cacophony of calls and fertilizing trees with their droppings.

Birds found in the middle and upper St. Johns River basins

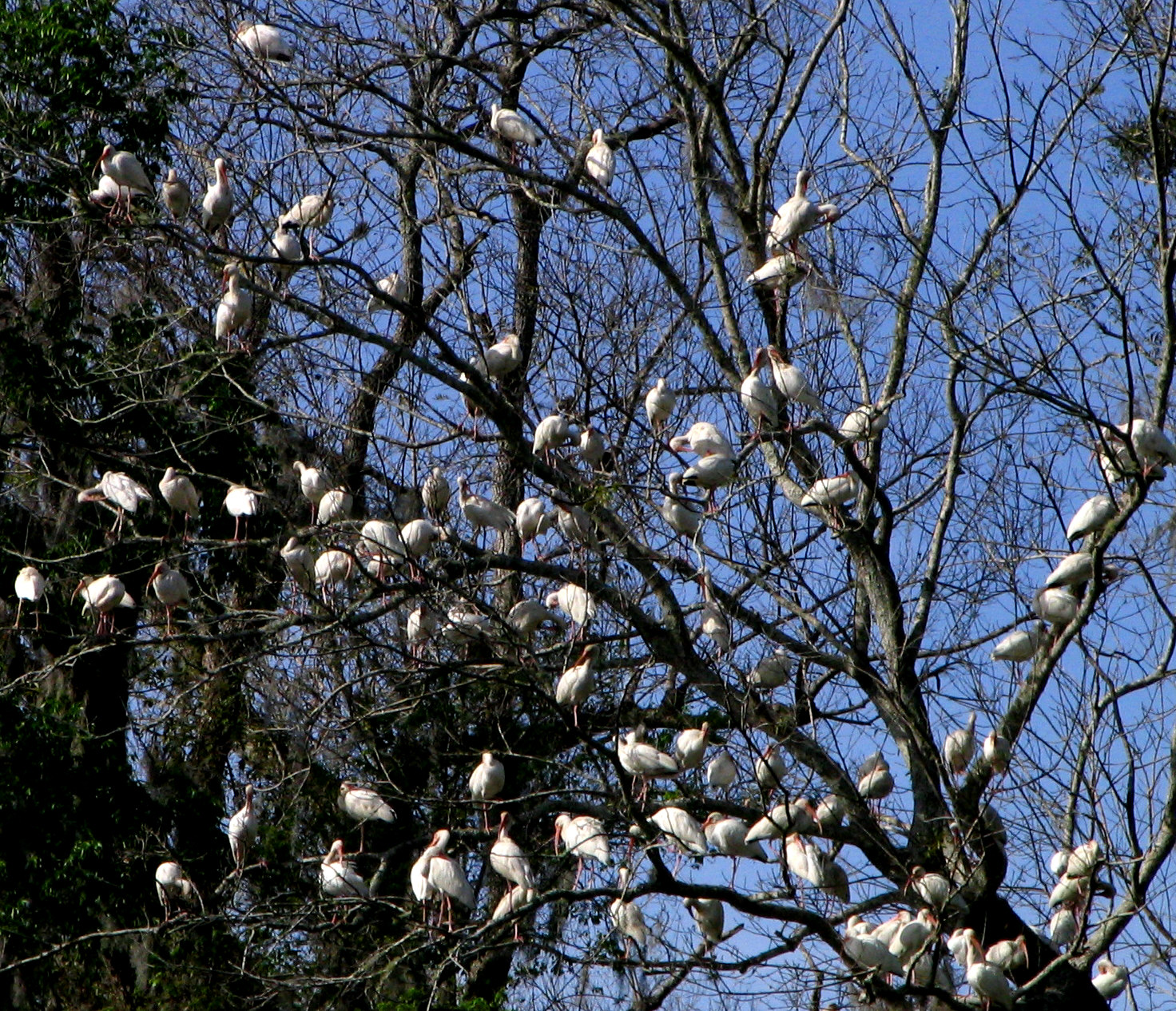
American white ibis (Eudocimus albus)

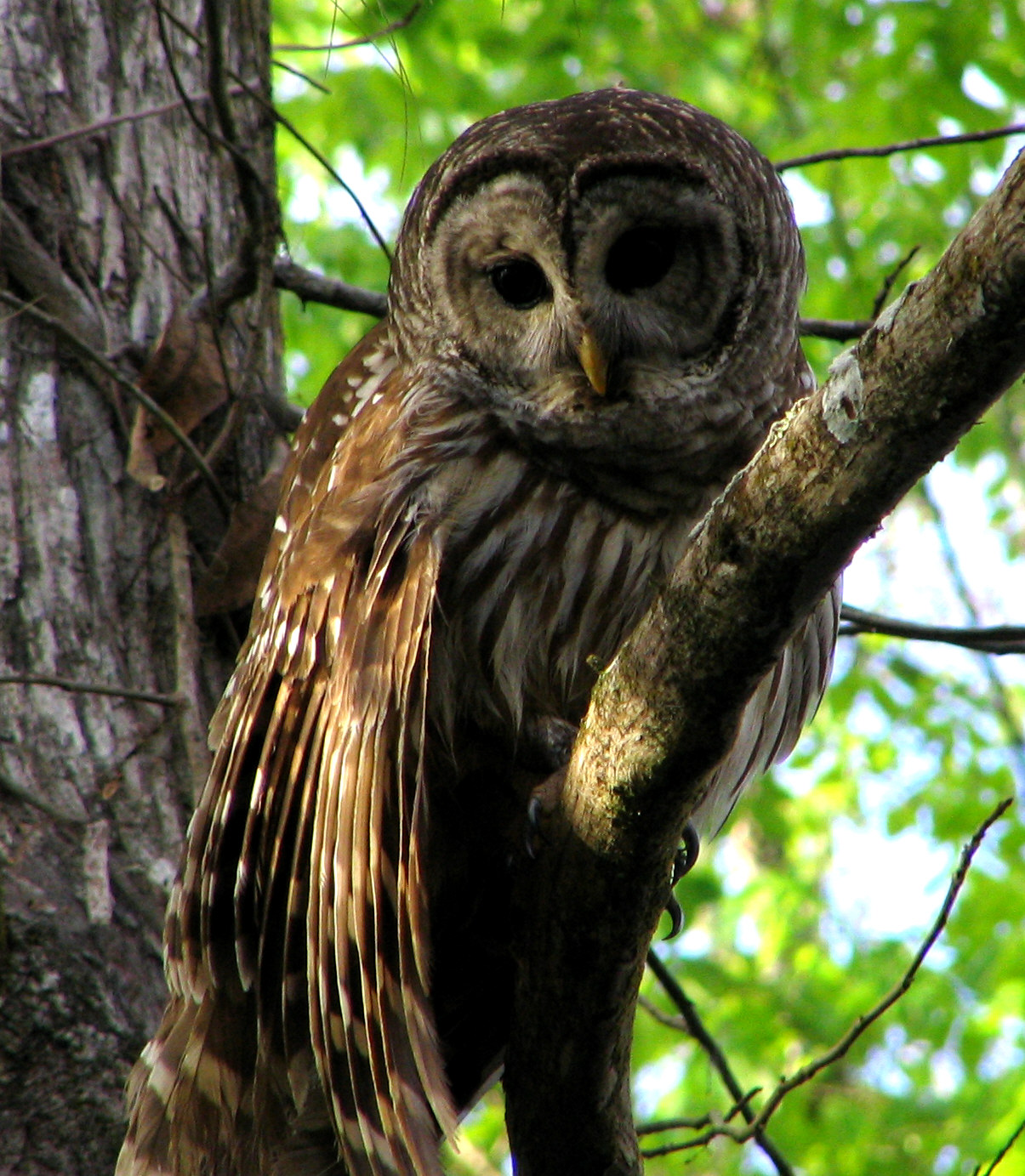
Barred owl (Strix varia)

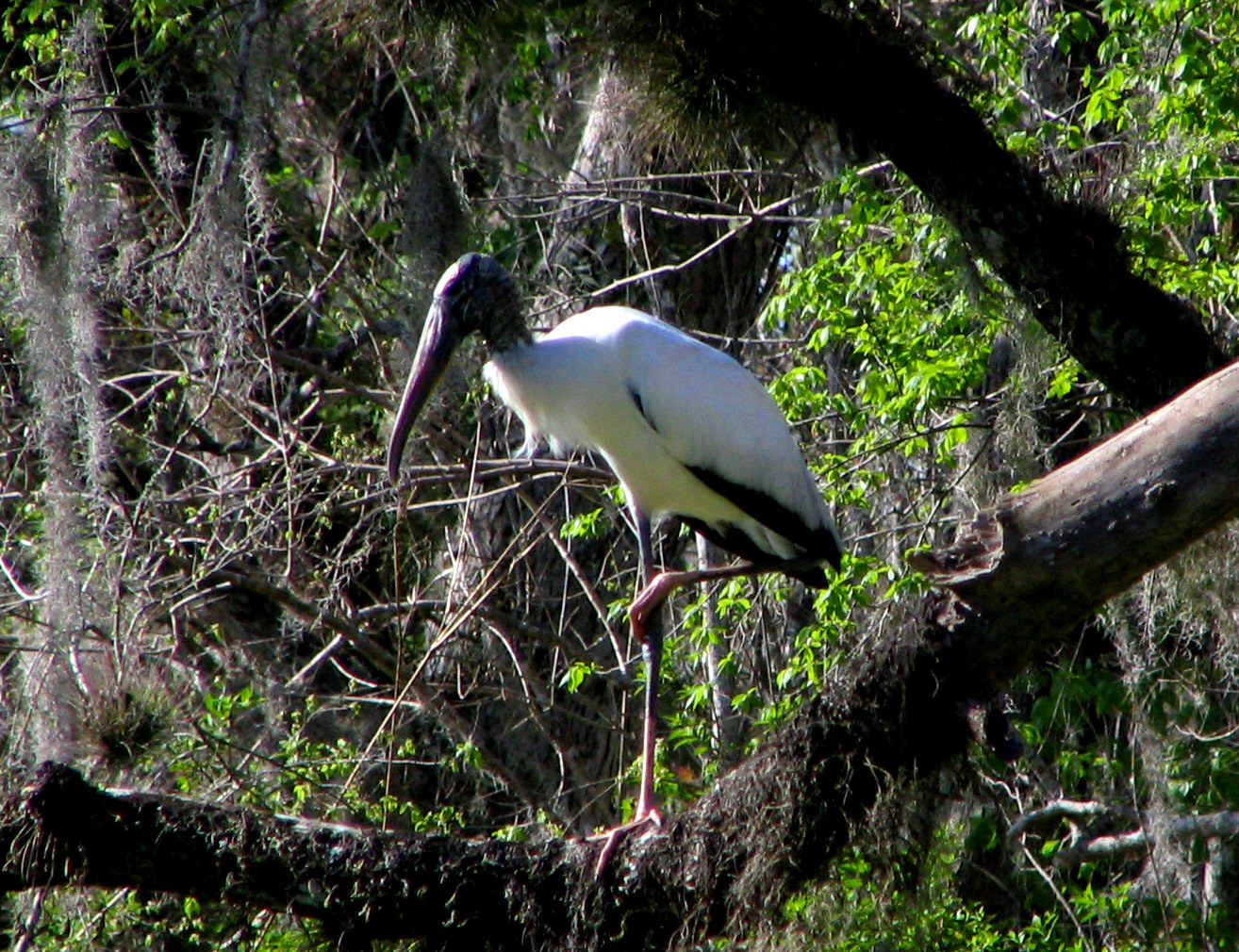
Wood stork (Mycteria americana)

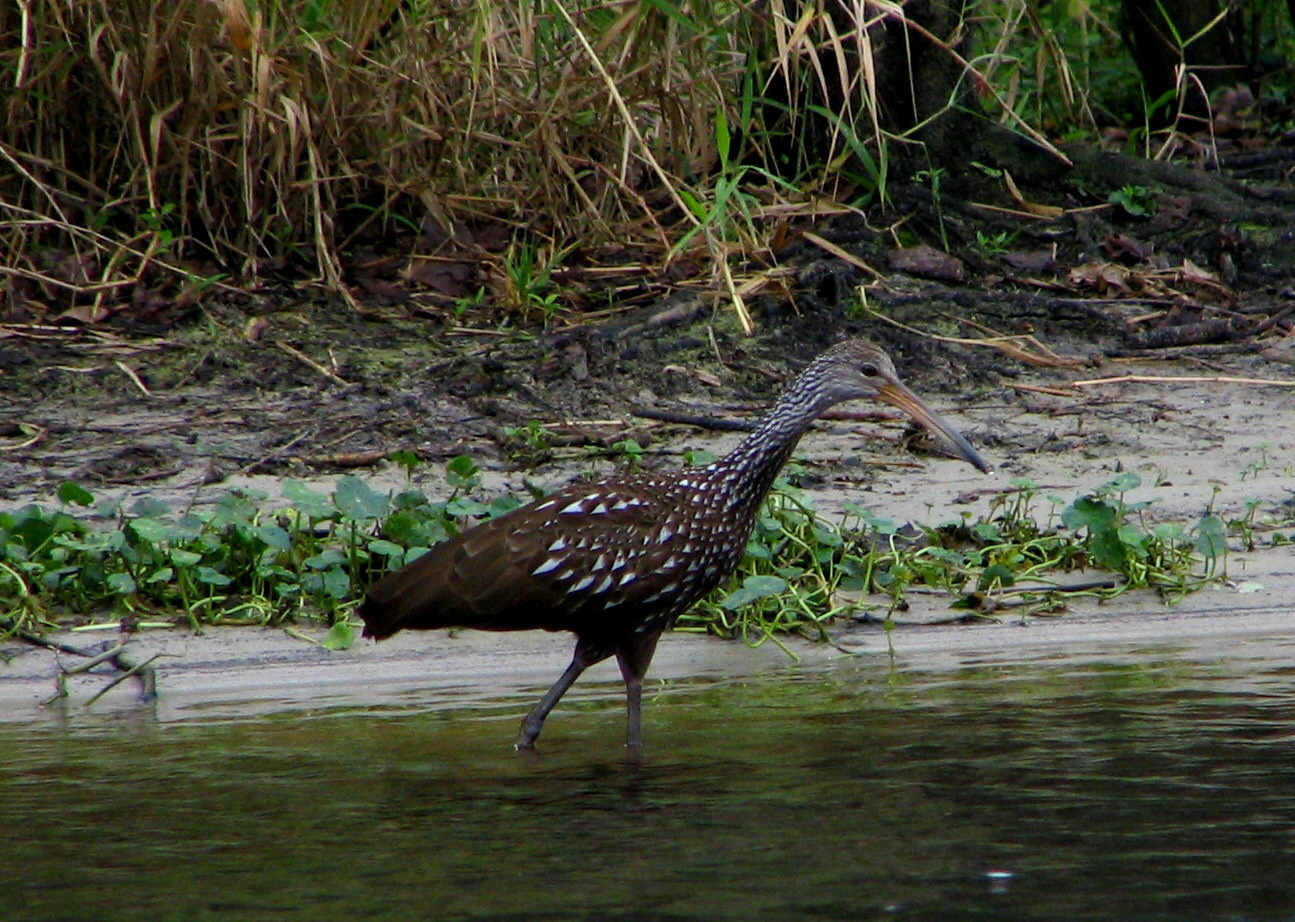
Limpkin (Aramus guarauna)

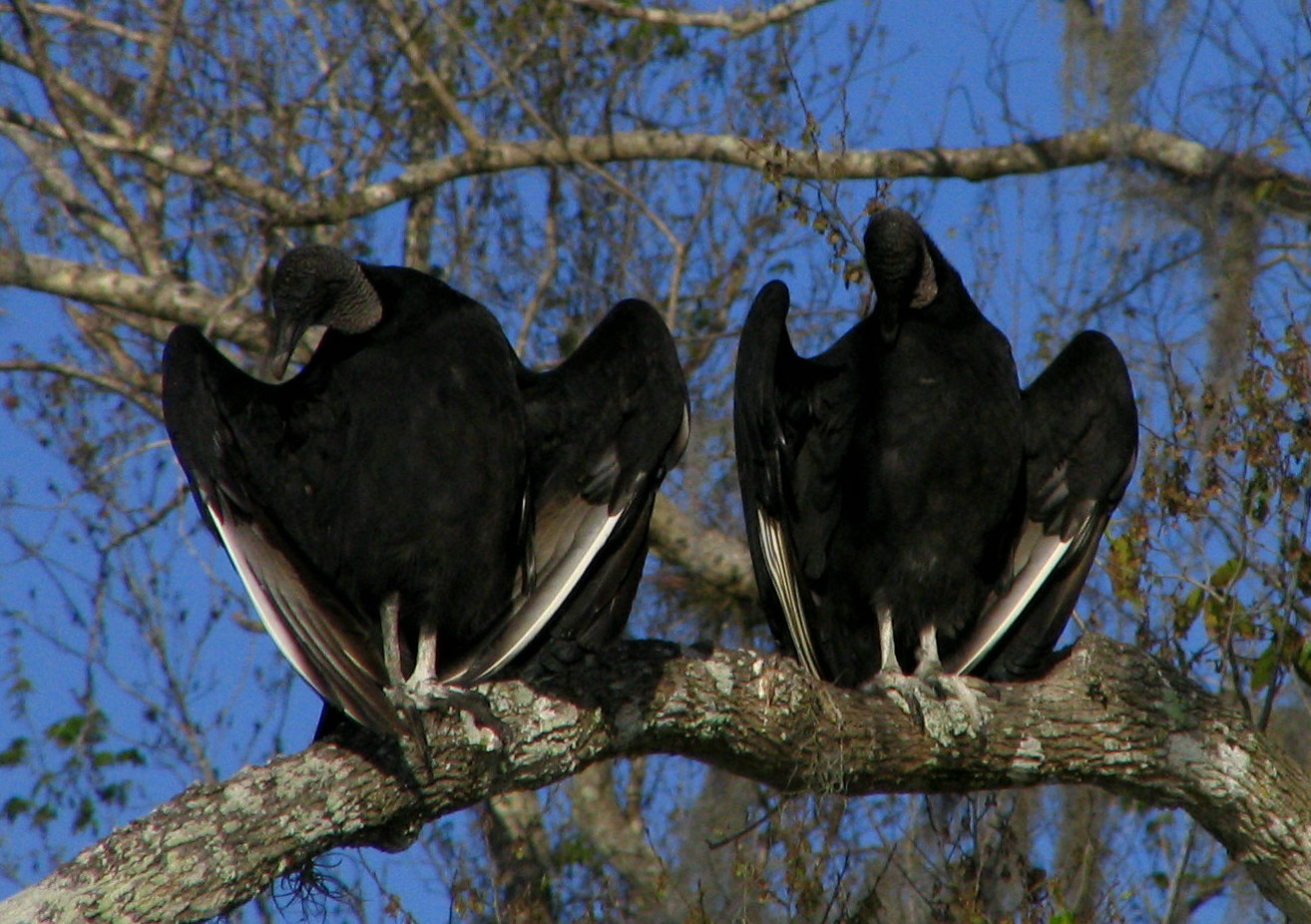
American black vulture (Coragyps atratus)

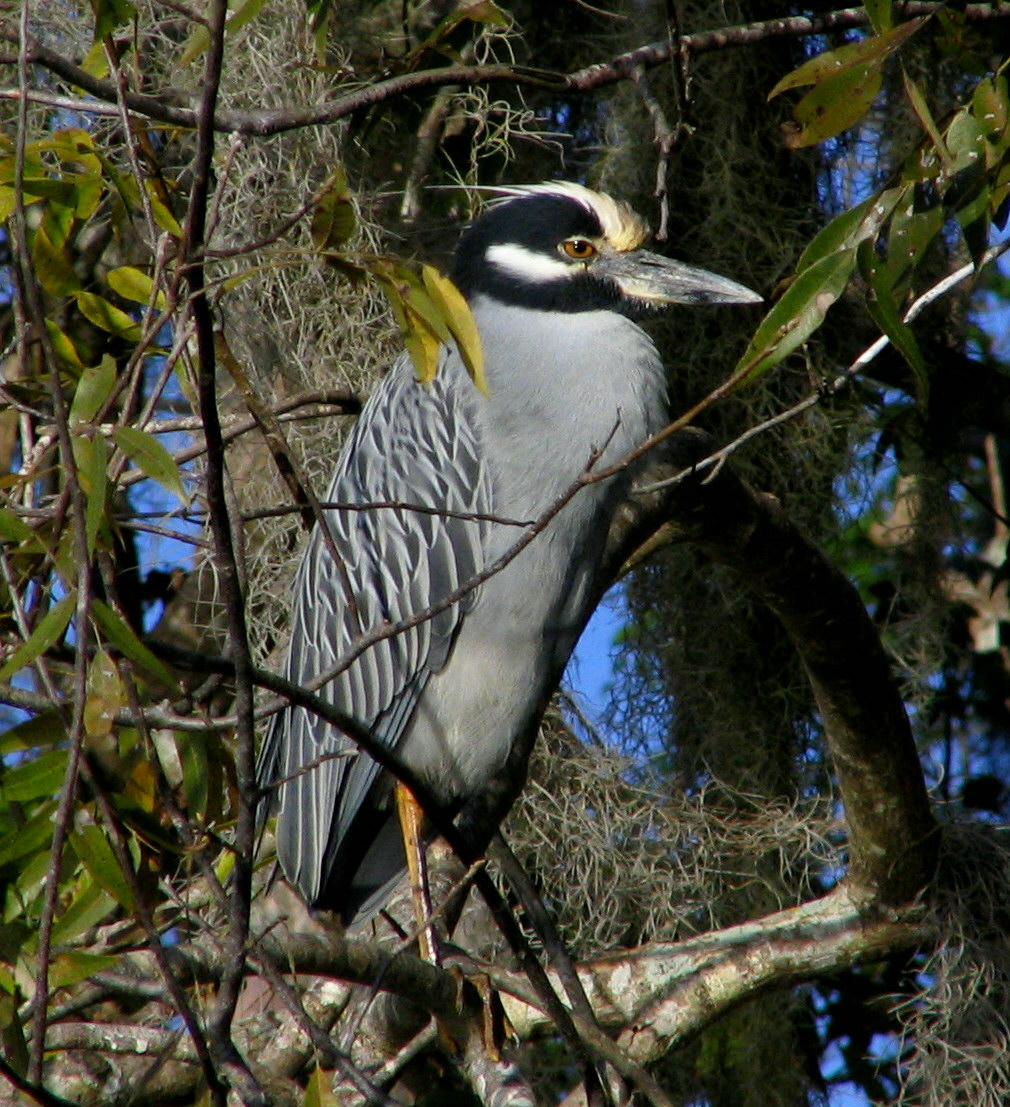
Yellow-crowned night heron (N. violacea)

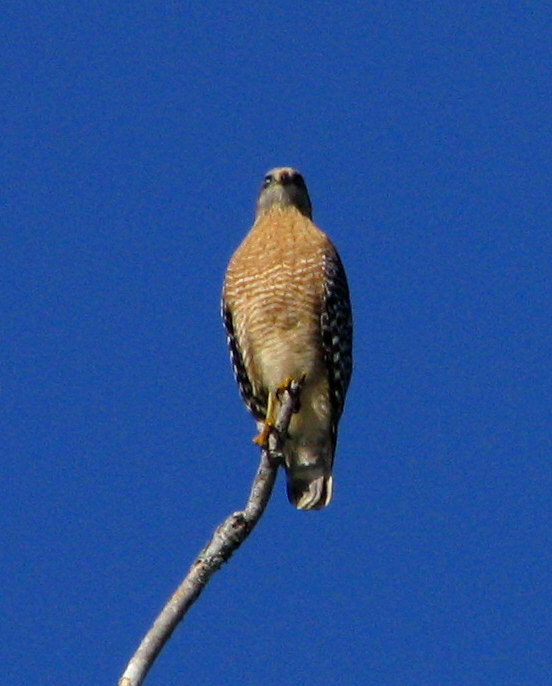
Red-shouldered hawk (Buteo lineatus)

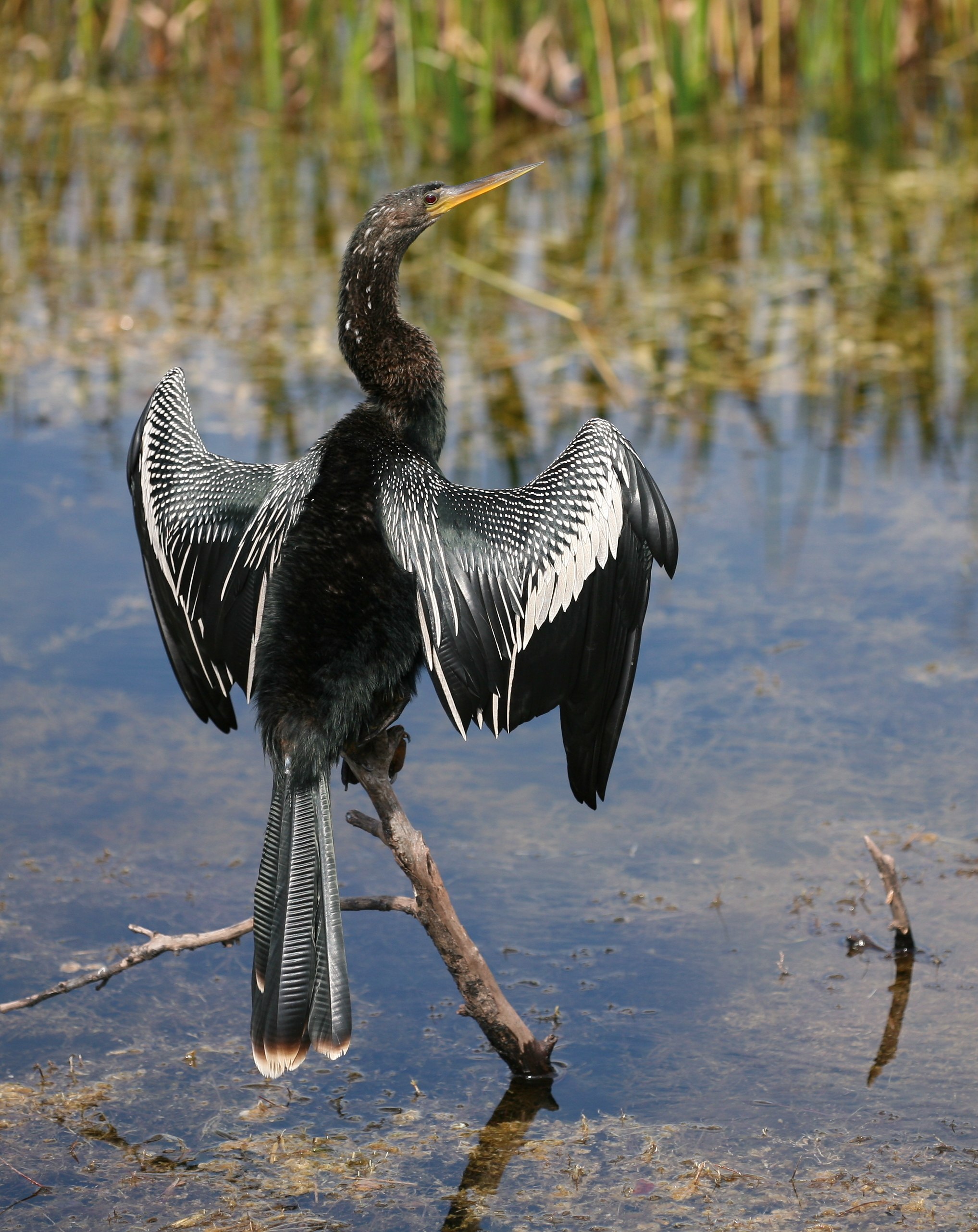
Anhinga (Anhinga anhinga)

=== Lake George ===
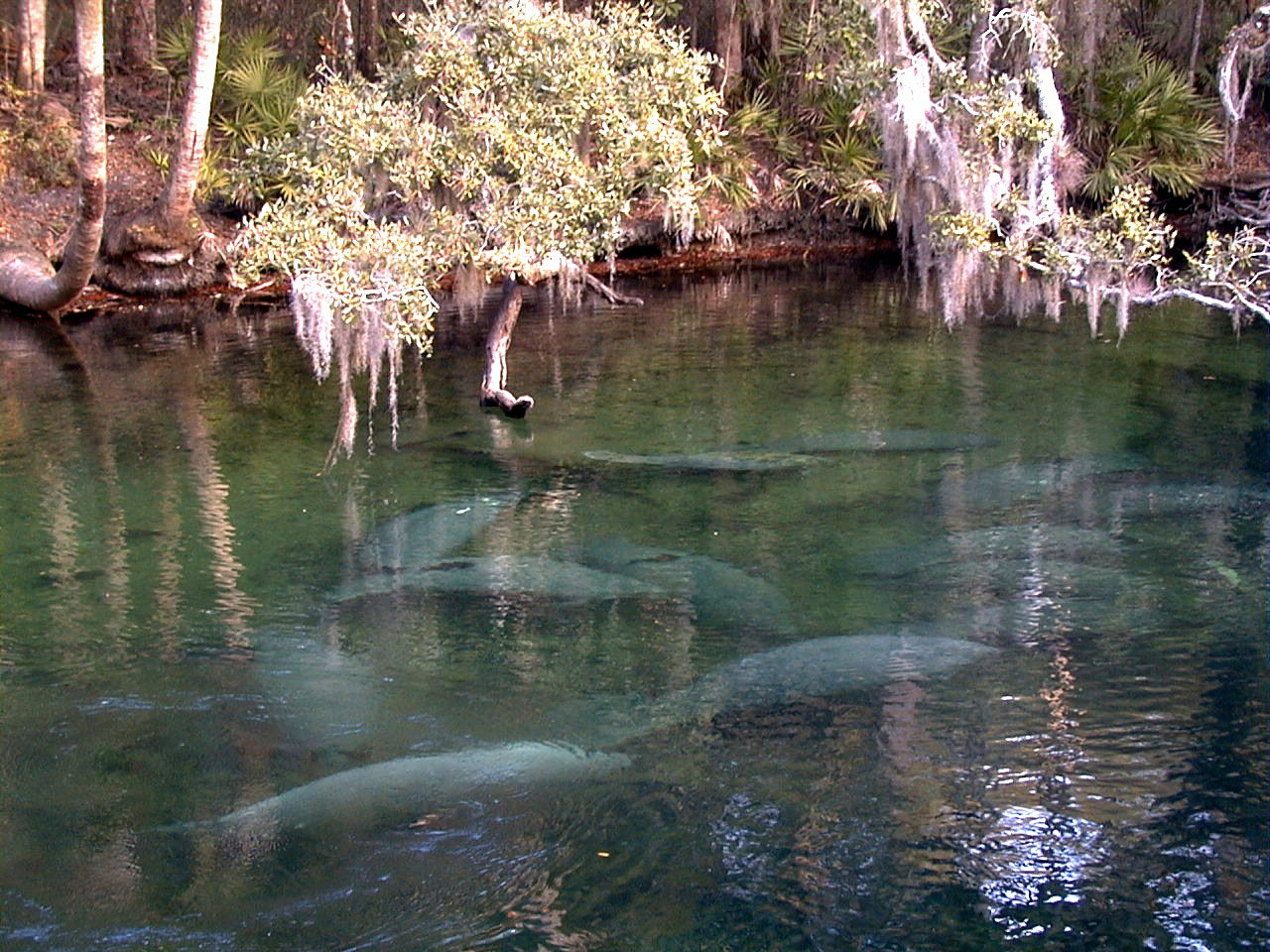
Manatees spend the winter months in Blue Spring and are protected by the Hontoon Island State Park.

The river turns north again as it rolls through a 46,000-acre (190 km^{2}) basin spreading across Putnam, Lake, and Marion Counties, and the western part of Volusia County. Slightly north of the Wekiva River is Blue Spring, the largest spring on the St. Johns, producing over 64,000,000 US gallons (240,000,000 L) a day. Florida springs stay at an even temperature of 72 °F (22 °C) throughout the year. Because of this, Blue Spring is the winter home for West Indian manatees (Trichechus manatus latirostris), and they are protected within Blue Spring State Park. Manatees are large, slow-moving herbivorous aquatic mammals whose primary threats are human development and collisions with swiftly moving watercraft. Many parts of the St. Johns and its tributaries are no-wake zones to protect manatees from being critically or fatally injured by boat propellers. Human interaction with manatees in Blue Spring State Park is forbidden.

Bordering to the north of Blue Spring State Park is Hontoon Island State Park, accessible only by boat. In 1955 an extremely rare Timucua totem representing an owl was found buried and preserved in the St. Johns muck off of Hontoon Island. The figure may signify that its creators were part of the owl clan. Representing different clans of the Timucua, two more totems—in all, the only totems in North America to have been found outside of the Pacific Northwest—shaped like a pelican and otter were found in 1978 after being snagged by a barge at the bottom of the river. River otters (Lutra canadensis) can be found through the length of the St. Johns and its tributaries, living in burrows or in the roots of trees bordering waterways. They eat crayfish, turtles, and small fish, and are active usually at night, playful but shy of human contact.

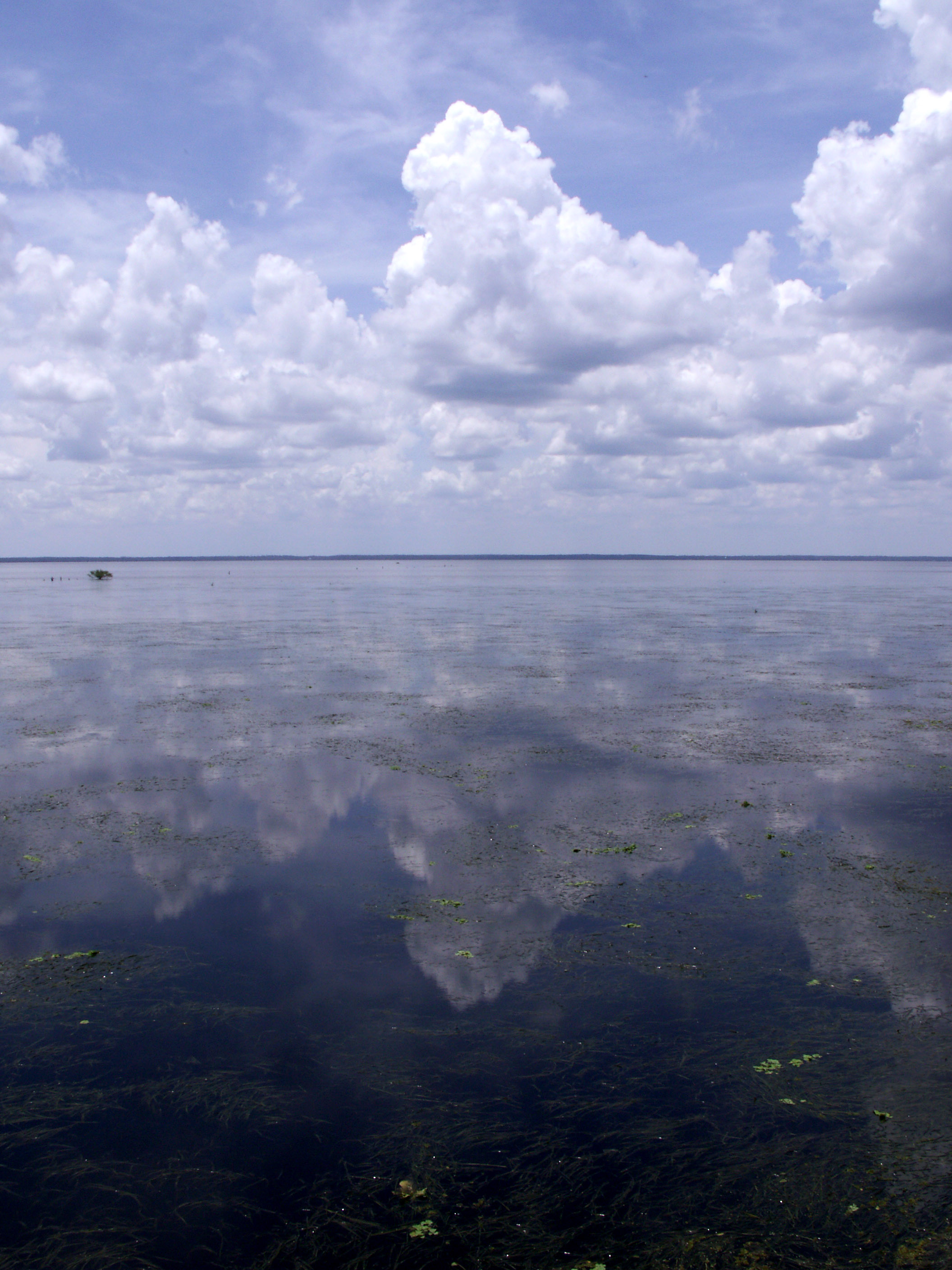
Lake George is the second largest lake in Florida and the largest created by the St. Johns.

The St. Johns creeps into the southern tip of Lake George, the second largest lake in Florida at 72 square miles (190 km^{2}), 6 miles (9.7 km) wide and 12 miles (19 km) long. The watershed surrounding Lake George expands through 3,590 square miles (9,300 km^{2}), lying within Ocala National Forest and Lake George State Forest, that protect an ecosystem dominated by pine and scrub more than 380,000 acres (1,500 km^{2}) and 21,000 acres (85 km^{2}) in size, respectively. Flatwoods forests dominate the Lake George watershed, with slash pines (Pinus elliottii), saw palmetto (Serenoa repens), and over 100 species of groundcover or herbal plants that grow in poor, sandy soil. Flatwoods pine forests stay relatively dry, but can withstand short periods of flooding. Larger land animals such as wild turkeys (Meleagris gallopavo), sandhill cranes (Grus canadensis), and the largest population of southern bald eagles (Haliaeetus leucocephalus leucocephalus) in the contiguous U.S., find it easier to live in the flatwoods. Typical mammals that live in these ecosystems, such as raccoons (Procyon lotor), opossums (Didelphis virginiana), bobcats (Lynx rufus), and white tailed-deer (Odocoileus virginianus), are ones that prefer dry, flat areas with good ground cover and available nesting sites.

=== Ocklawaha River ===
The Ocklawaha River flows north and joins the St. Johns as the largest tributary, and one of significant historical importance. The Ocklawaha (also printed as Oklawaha) drainage basin expands through Orange, Lake, Marion, and Alachua Counties, comprising a total of 2,769 square miles (7,170 km^{2}). Ocala, Gainesville, and the northern suburbs of the Orlando metropolitan area are included in this basin. There are two headwaters for the Ocklawaha: a chain of lakes, the largest of which is Lake Apopka in Lake County, and the Green Swamp near Haines City in Polk County, drained by the Palatlakaha River. The Silver River, fed by one of Florida's most productive springs expelling 54,000,000 US gallons (200,000,000 L) daily, is located about midway along the 96-mile (154 km) Ocklawaha.

The proliferation of largemouth bass (Micropterus salmoides), black crappie (Pomoxis nigromaculatus), and bluegill (Lepomis macrochirus) in central Florida is a major attraction for fishermen from all over the country. The St. Johns is home to 183 species of fish, 55 of which appear in the main stem of the river. One, the southern tessellated darter (Etheostoma olmstedi) is found only in the Ocklawaha. Some are marine species that either migrate upriver to spawn or have found spring-fed habitats that are high in salinity, such as a colony of Atlantic stingrays (Dasyatis sabina) that live in Lake Washington in the upper basin. Ocean worms, snails, and white-fingered mud crabs (Rhithropanopeus harrisii) have also been found far upriver where tidal influences are rare. In contrast, American eels (Anguilla rostrata) live in the St. Johns and Ocklawaha and spawn in the Sargasso Sea in the middle of the Atlantic Ocean. After a year living in the ocean, many of them find their way back to the St. Johns to live, then, prompted by the phases of the moon, make the return journey to spawn and die.

=== Lower basin ===
From the intersection of the Ocklawaha River, 101 miles (163 km) to the Atlantic Ocean, the lower basin drains a total area of 2,600 square miles (6,700 km^{2}) in Putnam, St. Johns, Clay, and Duval Counties. Twelve tributaries empty into the river in the lower basin. The river widens considerably on the north end of Lake George; between Lake George and Palatka the river ranges between 600 and 2,640 feet (180 and 800 m) wide. Between Palatka and Jacksonville it widens further to between 1 and 3 miles (1.6 and 4.8 km). This portion of the river is the most navigable, and shipping is its primary use. The Army Corps of Engineers maintains shipping channels at least 12 feet (3.7 m) deep and 100 feet (30 m) wide. North of Jacksonville, the channels are expanded to 40 feet (12 m) deep and between 400 and 900 feet (120 and 270 m) wide.

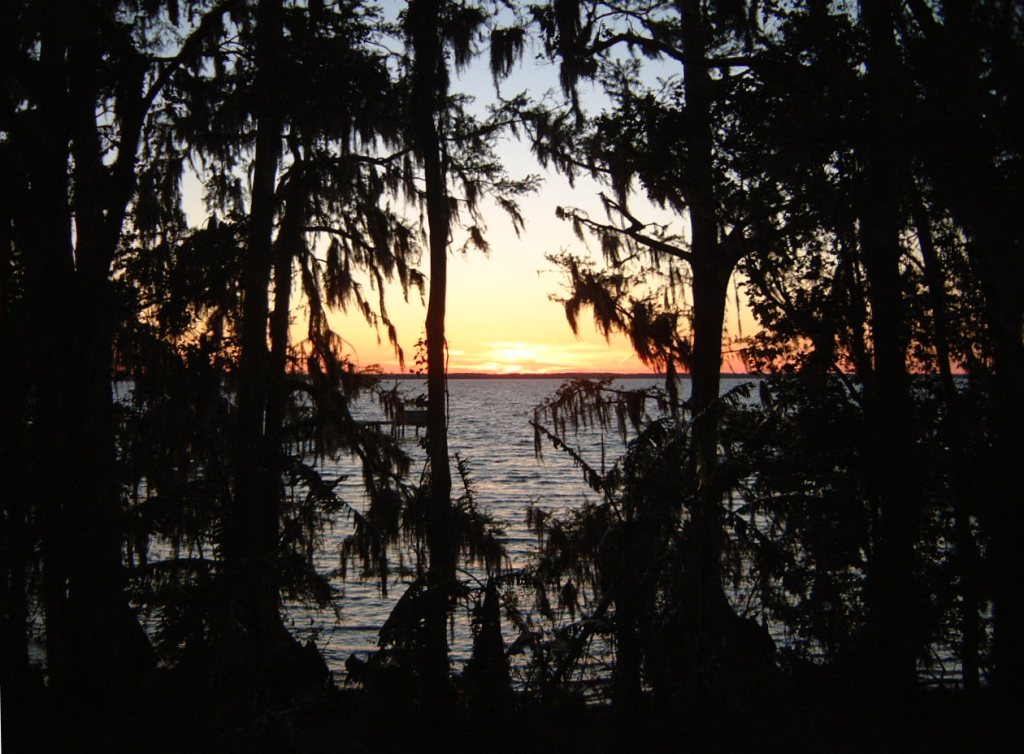
Cypress trees frame a sunset over the St. Johns near Picolata and Tocoi, former ferry landings in St. Johns County.

The towns and cities along the lower basin of the river are some of the oldest in Florida, and their histories have centered on the river. Both Palatka and Green Cove Springs have been popular tourist destinations in the past. Several smaller locations along the river sprang up around ferry landings, but when rail lines and then Interstate highways were constructed closer to the Atlantic Coast, many of the towns experienced significant economic decline, and ferry landings were forgotten.

The final 35 miles (56 km) of the river's course runs through Jacksonville with a population of more than one million. Much of the economic base of Jacksonville depends on the river: 18,000,000 short tons (16,000,000 t) of goods are shipped in and out of Jacksonville annually. Exports include paper, phosphate, fertilizers, and citrus, while major imports include oil, coffee, limestone, cars, and lumber. The Port of Jacksonville produces $1.38 billion in the local economy and supports 10,000 jobs. The U.S. Navy has two bases in the Jacksonville area: Naval Station Mayport, at the mouth of the river, serves as the second largest Atlantic Fleet operation and home port in the country. Naval Air Station Jacksonville is one of the service's largest air installations, home to two air wings and over 150 fixed-wing and rotary-wing aircraft, and the host for one of only two full-fledged Naval Hospitals remaining in Florida.

If I could have, to hold forever, one brief place and time of beauty, I think I might choose the night on that high lonely bank above the St. Johns River —Marjorie Kinnan Rawlings in Cross Creek

Using an unofficial nickname of "The River City", Jacksonville has a culture centered on the St. Johns. An annual footrace named the Gate River Run accepts 18,000 participants who travel a course along and over the river twice. The largest kingfishing tournament in the U.S. is held on a St. Johns tributary, where sport fishers concentrate on king mackerel (Scomberomorus cavalla), cobia (Rachycentron canadum), dolphin (Coryphaena hippurus) and Wahoo (Acanthocybium solandri). The home stadium for the Jacksonville Jaguars faces the river, as does most of the commercial center of downtown. Seven bridges span the St. Johns at Jacksonville; all of them allow tall ships to pass, although some restrict passing times when train or automobile traffic is heavy.

Tides cause seawater to enter the mouth of the St. Johns River and can affect the river's level into the middle basin. As a result, much of the river in Jacksonville is part seawater, making it an estuarine ecosystem. The animals and plants in these systems can tolerate both fresh and salt water, and the fluctuations in saline content and temperatures associated with tidal surges and heavy rainfall discharge. Marine animals such as dolphins and sharks can be spotted at times in the St. Johns at Jacksonville as can manatees. Fish such as mullet (Mullidae), flounder (Paralichthys lethostigma), shad (Alosa sapidissima), and blue crabs (Callinectes sapidus) migrate from the ocean to freshwater springs upriver to spawn.

Although freshwater invertebrates inhabiting and comprising algae and periphyton make the foundation of food webs in the middle and lower basin, zooplankton and phytoplankton take that role in the estuarine habitat. Mollusks gather at the St. Johns estuary in large numbers, feeding on the bottom of the river and ocean floors. The abundance and importance of oysters (Crassostrea virginica) is apparent in the many middens left by the Timucua in mounds many feet high. Oysters and other mollusks serve as the primary food source of shorebirds. The large trees that line the river from its source to south of Jacksonville begin to transition into salt marshes east of the city. Mayport is home to approximately 20 shrimping vessels that use the mouth of the St. Johns to access the Atlantic Ocean.

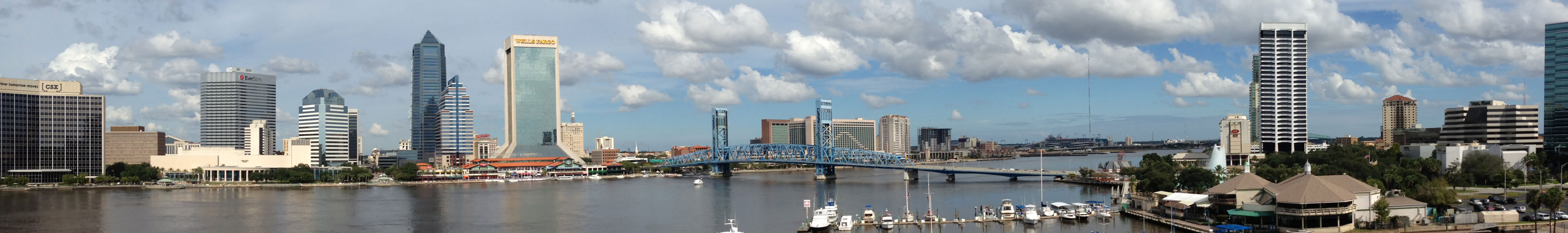
Downtown Jacksonville's commercial district on the St. Johns River

== Formation and hydrology ==
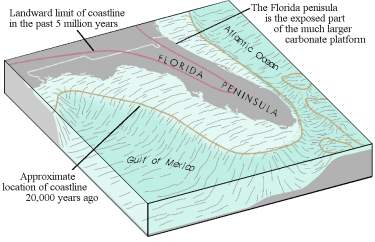
Florida platform (outer boundary) as it appeared the first time humans inhabited the peninsula

=== Geologic history ===
Lying within a coastal plain, the St. Johns River passes through an area that was at one time barrier islands, coastal dunes, and estuary marshes. The Florida Peninsula was created primarily by forces and minerals from the ocean. It lies so low that minor fluctuations in sea levels can have a dramatic effect on its geomorphology. Florida was once part of the supercontinent Gondwana. Lying underneath the visible rock formations is a basement of igneous granite and volcanic composition under a sedimentary layer formed during the Paleozoic era 542 to 251 million years ago. During the Cretaceous period (145 to 66 million years ago), the basement and its sedimentary overlay were further covered by calcium carbonate and formations left by the evaporation of water called evaporites. What covers the peninsula is the result of simultaneous processes of deposits of sands, shells, and coral, and erosion from water and weather. As ocean water has retreated and progressed, the peninsula has been covered with sea water at least seven times. Waves compressed sands, calcium carbonate, and shells into limestone; at the ocean's edge, beach ridges were created by this depositional forming. North–south axis rivers, such as the St. Johns, were created by past beach ridges which were often divided by swales. As ocean water retreated, lagoons formed in the swales, which were further eroded by acidic water. Barrier islands, furthermore, formed along the Atlantic Coast, surrounding the lagoon with land and forming a freshwater river.

From its origins to approximately the area of Sanford, the St. Johns flows north. It takes a sharp turn west near Sanford for a few miles—which is referred to as the St. Johns River offset, but shortly changes direction to flow north again. Geologists hypothesize that the west-flowing offset may have formed earlier than the north flowing portions, possibly during the late Tertiary or early Pleistocene era 66 to 12 million years ago. Some fracturing and faulting may also be responsible for the offset. Although seismic activity in Florida is mostly insignificant, several minor earthquakes have occurred near the St. Johns River, caused by the trough created by Pangaean rifting.

=== Springs and aquifers ===
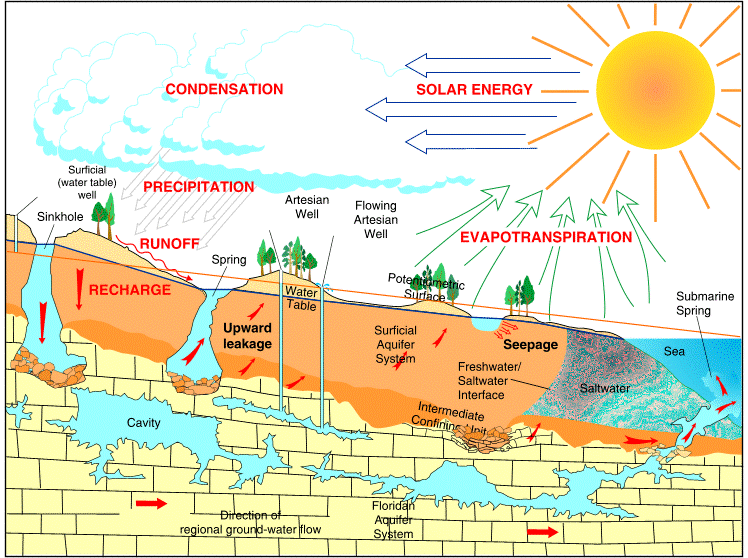
The hydrologic cycle in Florida, showing the Floridan aquifer and formation of springs and sinkholes

All of Florida's abundant fresh water is the result of precipitation that returns to the atmosphere in a process called evapotranspiration that involves evaporation and transpiration of moisture from plants. As rains fall, most of the water is directed to lakes, streams, and rivers. However, a significant amount of fresh water is held underground but close to the surface in aquifers. A surficial aquifer consisting mostly of clay, shells, and sand is over a confining layer of denser materials. Wells are drilled in the surficial aquifer, which supplies better quality water in areas where the deepest aquifer has a high mineral content. Occasionally the confining layer is fractured to allow breaches of water to percolate down to recharge the layer below. The Floridan Aquifer, underneath the confining layer, underlies the entire state and portions of Georgia, Alabama, Mississippi, and South Carolina. It is particularly accessible in the northern part of Florida, serving as the fresh water source of metropolitan areas from St. Petersburg north to Jacksonville and Tallahassee.

Acidic rainwater erodes the limestone and can form caverns. When the overlay of these caverns is particularly thin—less than 100 feet (30 m)—sinkholes can form. Where the limestone or sand/clay overlay dissolves over the aquifer and the pressure of the water pushes out, springs form. The upper and middle basins of the St. Johns River are located in a portion of the peninsula where the aquifer system is thinly confined, meaning springs and sinkholes are abundant. Springs are measured in magnitude of how much water is discharged, which is dependent upon season and rainfall. The greatest discharge is from first magnitude springs that emit at least 100 cubic feet (2.8 m^{3}) of water per second. There are four first magnitude springs that feed the St. Johns River: Silver Springs in Marion County, emitting between 250 and 1,290 cubic feet per second (7.1 and 36.5 m^{3}/s); Silver Glen Spring straddling Marion and Lake Counties, emitting between 38 and 245 cubic feet per second (1.1 and 6.9 m^{3}/s); Alexander Springs in Lake County, emitting between 56 and 202 cubic feet per second (1.6 and 5.7 m^{3}/s); and Blue Spring in Volusia County, emitting between 87 and 218 cubic feet per second (2.5 and 6.2 m^{3}/s).

=== Rainfall and climate ===
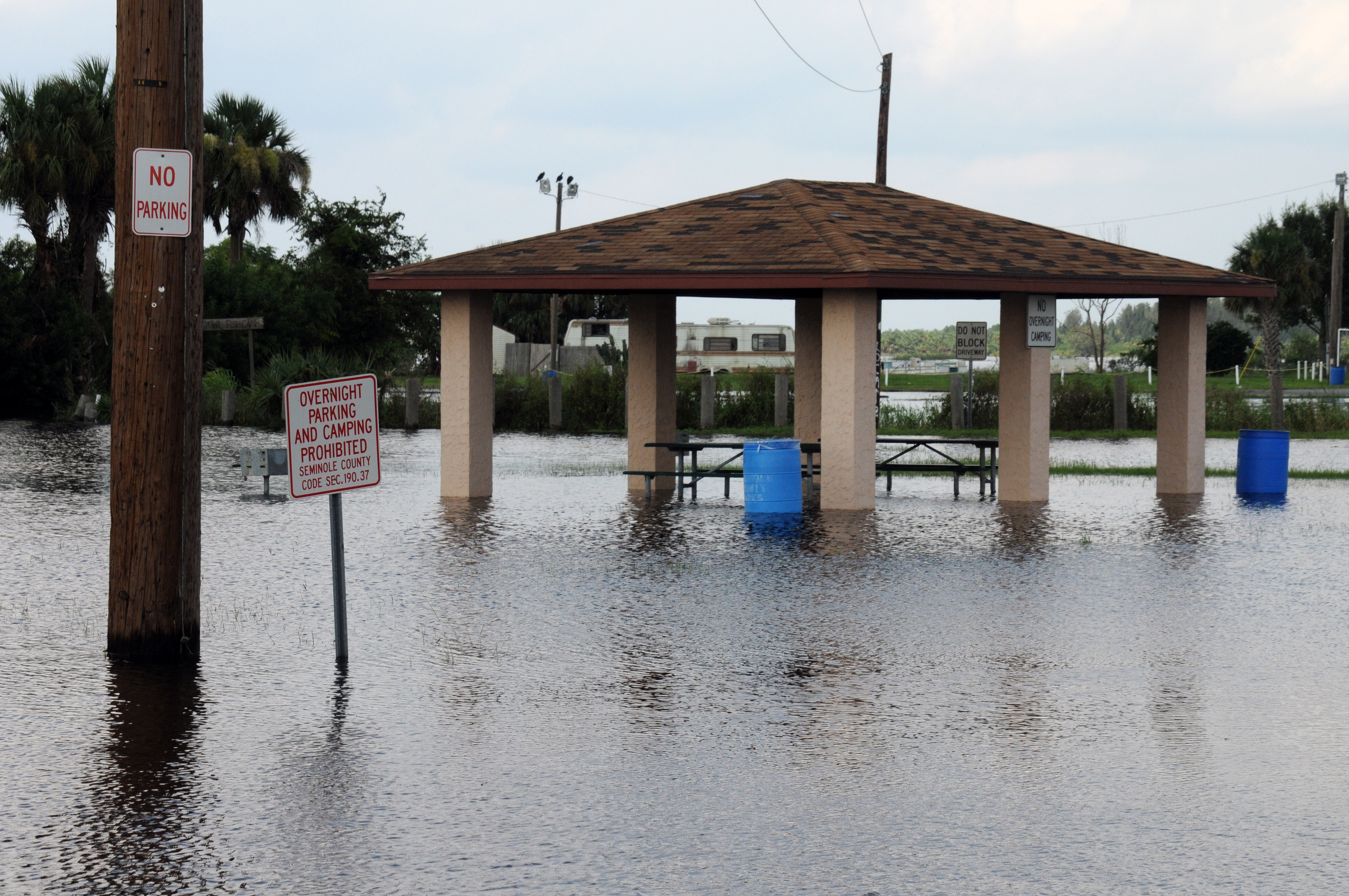
Tropical Storm Fay caused record flooding in Geneva in 2008.

The St. Johns River lies within a humid subtropical zone. In summer months, the temperature ranges from 74 and 92 °F (23 and 33 °C), and between 50 and 72 °F (10 and 22 °C) in the winter, although drops may occur in winter months to below freezing approximately a dozen times. Water temperatures in the river correlate to the air temperatures. The average range of water temperatures is between 50 and 95 °F (10 and 35 °C), rising in the summer months. Where the river widens between Palatka and Jacksonville, wind becomes a significant factor in navigation, and both whitecap waves and calm surface waters are common.

Rain occurs more frequently in late summer and early fall. Tropical storms and nor'easters are common occurrences along the Atlantic coast of Florida; the St. Johns River lies between 10 and 30 miles (16 and 48 km) inland, so any storm striking the counties of Indian River north to Duval produces rain that is drained by the St. Johns River. Tropical Storm Fay in 2008 deposited 16 inches (410 mm) of rain in a 5-day period, most of it located near Melbourne. The St. Johns near Geneva in Seminole County rose 7 feet (2.1 m) in four days, setting a record. The river near Sanford rose 3 feet (1 m) in 36 hours. Fay caused severe flooding in the middle basin due not only to the deluge but the flat slopes of the river. Typically, however, the St. Johns basin receives between 50 and 54 inches (1,300 and 1,400 mm) of rain annually, half of it in summer months. The rate of evapotranspiration corresponds to rainfall, ranging between 27 and 57 inches (690 and 1,450 mm) a year, most of it occurring in the summer.

Raw data
Average monthly rainfall (in inches) for three cities (Vero Beach, Sanford, Jacksonville) on the St. Johns

=== Flow rates and water quality ===
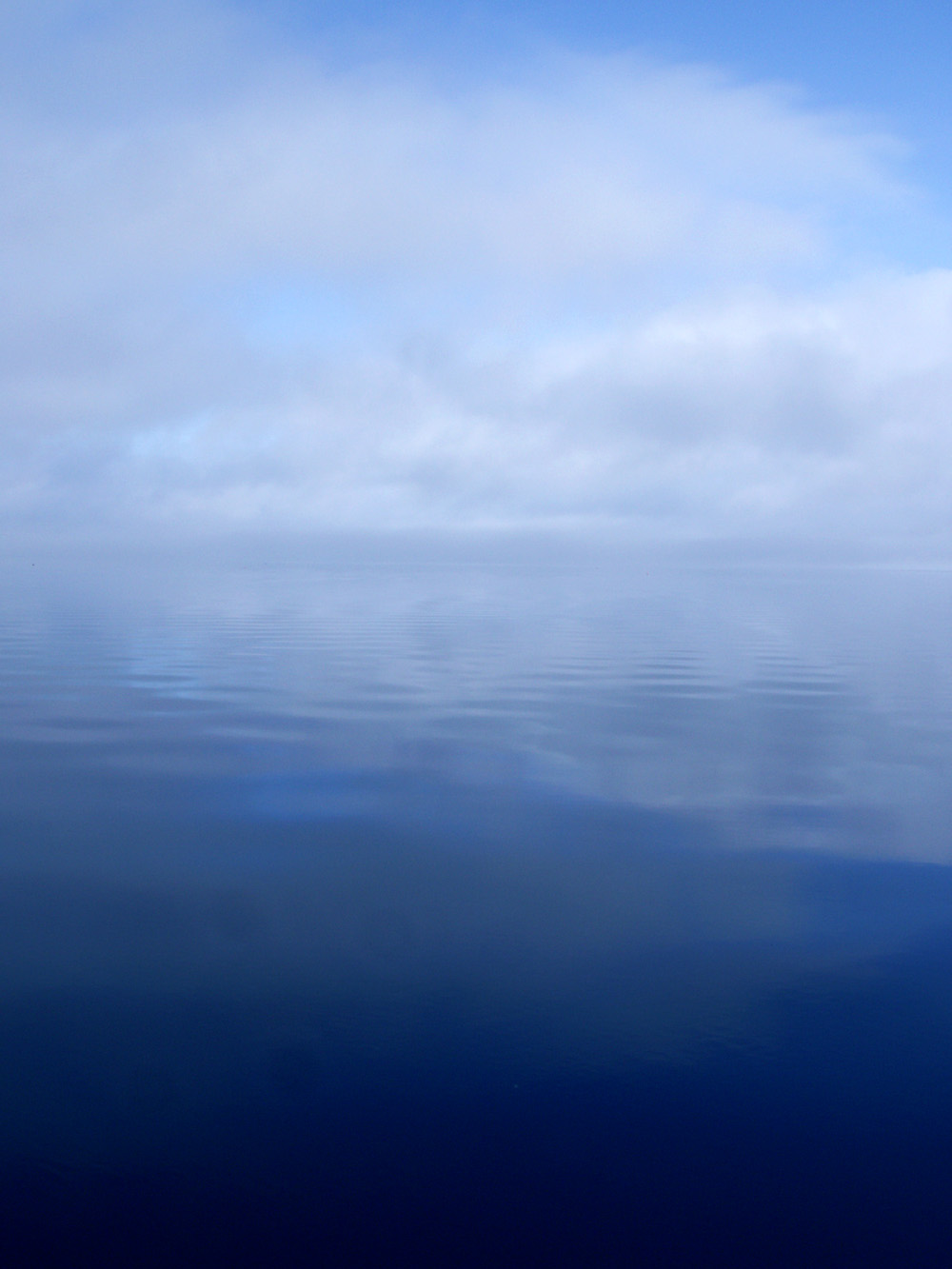
Fog on a calm St. Johns River at the Shands Bridge near Green Cove Springs

The entire river lies within the nearly flat Pamlico terrace, giving it an overall gradient of 0.8 inches (2.0 cm) per mile (km); it is one of the flattest major rivers on the continent. Its proximity to the ocean in the lower basin affects its rise and fall with tides and salinity. Tides regularly affect water levels as far south as Lake George; when combined with extreme winds, the river's tidal effects can extend to Lake Monroe 161 miles (259 km) away and have on occasion reached Lake Harney. Tides typically raise the river level about 1.2 feet (0.37 m) at Jacksonville, decreasing some to 0.7 feet (0.21 m) at Orange Park where the river widens, and increasing back to 1.2 feet (0.37 m) at Palatka as it narrows. As a result of tidal effects, discharge measurements in the lower basin are often inaccurate. However, the estimated rate of discharge between the Ocklawaha River and the center of Jacksonville ranges from 4,000 to 8,300 cubic feet (110 to 240 m^{3}) per second. The nontidal discharge at the mouth at Mayport averages 15,000 cubic feet (420 m^{3}) per second, but with tides it exceeds 50,000 cubic feet (1,400 m^{3}) per second, and following heavy rains combined with tides can top 150,000 cubic feet (4,200 m^{3}) per second. Farther upriver, the discharge rate ranges from 1,030 cubic feet (29 m^{3}) per second near Lake Poinsett to 2,850 cubic feet (81 m^{3}) per second near DeLand. The confluence of numerous springs, the Econlockhatchee River, and the Wekiva River causes the average discharge to increase by 940 cubic feet (27 m^{3}) per second between Lake Harney and DeLand, representing the greatest annual average increase of streamflow along the St. Johns.

As distance between the mouth of the St. Johns and the middle and upper basins increases, the salinity in the river gradually decreases. Marine water measures at 35 parts per thousand (ppt) or more while fresh water measures below 2 ppt. What ranges in between is characterized as brackish water. Near the center of Jacksonville, average measures have been collected at 11.40 ppt. Farther south at the Buckman Bridge, joining the south side of Jacksonville to Orange Park, it decreases to 2.9 ppt and falls again to 0.81 ppt at the Shands Bridge near Green Cove Springs.

Dissolved oxygen in fresh water is measured to indicate the health of plant and animal life. It enters water through the atmosphere and from aquatic plant photosynthesis, and is affected by water pressure and temperature. Rapid decomposition of organic materials will decrease the amount of dissolved oxygen in the river, as will nutrients added to the water artificially by wastewater treatment runoff or drainage from fertilized agricultural fields. The U.S. Environmental Protection Agency and the State of Florida recommend no less than 5 mg of oxygen per liter. Several locations on the St. Johns or its tributaries reported at or below these minimums in the 1990s, including the mouth of the Wekiva River, the St. Johns at the town of Christmas, and in the early 2000s at Blue Spring and Blackwater Creek. Sustained low levels of dissolved oxygen may create algal blooms, which may also cause a further decrease in dissolved oxygen.

Like all blackwater streams in Florida, the color of most of the St. Johns is black, owing to the tannins in leaf litter and decaying aquatic plants. Spring fed streams, on the other hand, are remarkably clear and visibility is very high, even when the river bottom is dozens of feet below.

== Human history ==
=== Pre-Columbian people ===
Humans arrived on the Florida Peninsula about 12,000 years ago when the ocean was about 350 feet (110 m) lower than today, and the peninsula was double its current size. These earliest people are called Paleo-Indians. They were primarily hunter–gatherers who followed large game, such as mastodons, horses, camels, and bison. Much of the land was far from water—most fresh water was contained in glaciers and polar ice caps. As a result, Florida was an arid landscape with few trees, dominated by grasslands and scrub vegetation.

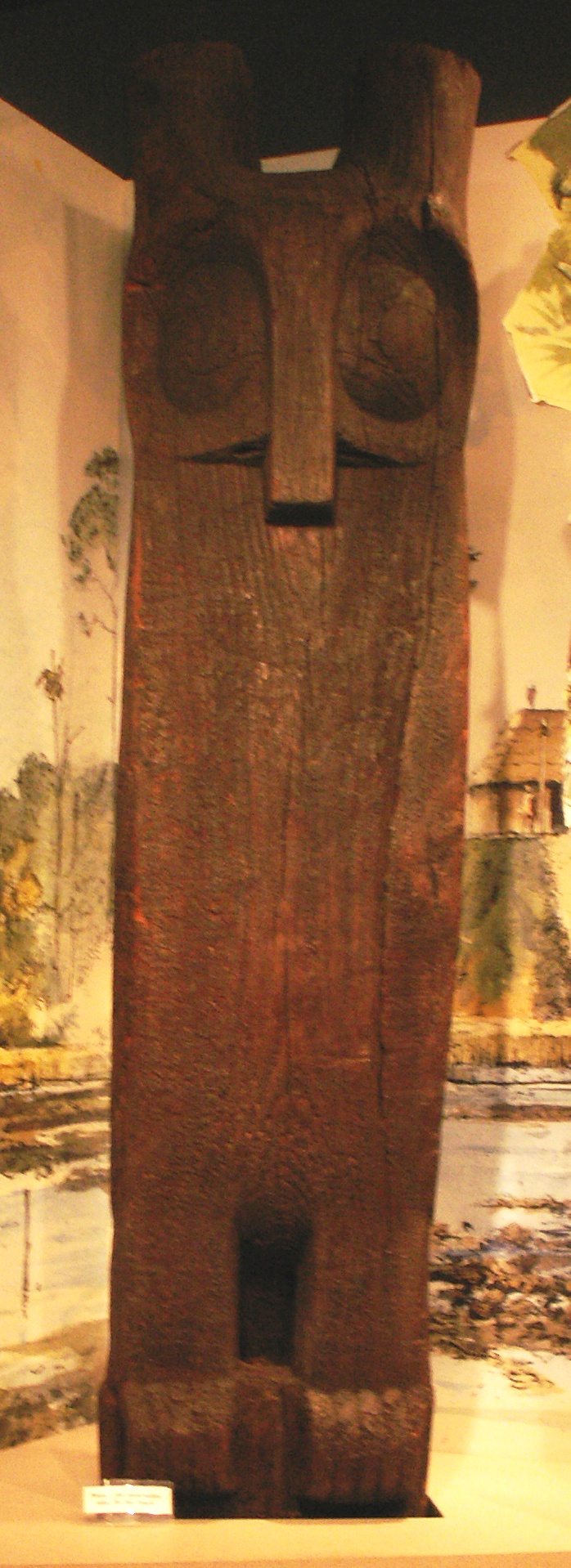
An extremely rare Timucua owl totem, found buried in muck near Hontoon Island, on display at Fort Caroline National Memorial

Around 9,000 years ago, the climate warmed, melting much of the polar ice caps and many glaciers, creating a wetter environment and submerging half the peninsular shelf. As Paleo-Indians now did not have to travel as far to find water, their camps became more permanent, turning into villages. With evidence of a wide variety of tools constructed around this time, archeologists note the transition into Archaic people. The Archaic people made tools from bone, animal teeth, and antlers. They wove fibers from plants such as cabbage palms and saw palmettos. A few burial sites have been excavated—including the Windover Archaeological Site in Brevard County near Titusville—that provide evidence of burial rituals. Archaic peoples interred their dead in shallow peat marshes, which preserved much of the human tissue. Further climate change between 5,000 and 3,000 years ago led to the Middle Archaic period; evidence suggests that human habitation near the St. Johns River first occurred during this era. Populations of indigenous people increased significantly at this time, and numerous settlements near the St. Johns have been recorded from this era; the banks of the St. Johns and its arteries are dotted with middens filled with thousands of shells, primarily those of Viviparus georgianus—a freshwater snail—and oysters.

The advent of regional types of pottery and stone tools made of flint or limestone marked further advancements around 500 BCE. The Archaic people transitioned into settled groups around Florida. From the central part of the state north, along the Atlantic Coast lived people in the St. Johns culture, named for the most significant nearby natural formation. Around 750 CE, the St. Johns culture learned to cultivate corn, adding to their diet of fish, game, and gourds. Archeologists and anthropologists date this agricultural advancement to coincide with a spread of archeological sites, suggesting that a population increase followed. When European explorers arrived in north Florida, they met the Timucua, numbering about 14,000, the largest group of indigenous people in the region. The later Seminole people called the river Welaka or Ylacco. These forms may derive from the Creek wi-láko, "big water", a compound usually applied to large rivers that run through lakes; the St. Johns forms and borders numerous lakes. Alternately, the Seminole name may derive from walaka (from wi-alaka, "water" and "coming"), perhaps a reference to the river's slow discharge and the tidal effects on it. The name is sometimes rendered as "Chain of Lakes" in English.

In 1955 an extremely rare Timucua totem representing an owl was found buried and preserved in the St. Johns muck off of Hontoon Island. The figure may signify that its creators were part of the owl clan. Representing different clans of the Timucua, two more totems—in all, the only totems in North America to have been found outside of the Pacific Northwest—shaped like a pelican and otter were found in 1978 after being snagged by a barge at the bottom of the river.

=== Colonial era ===
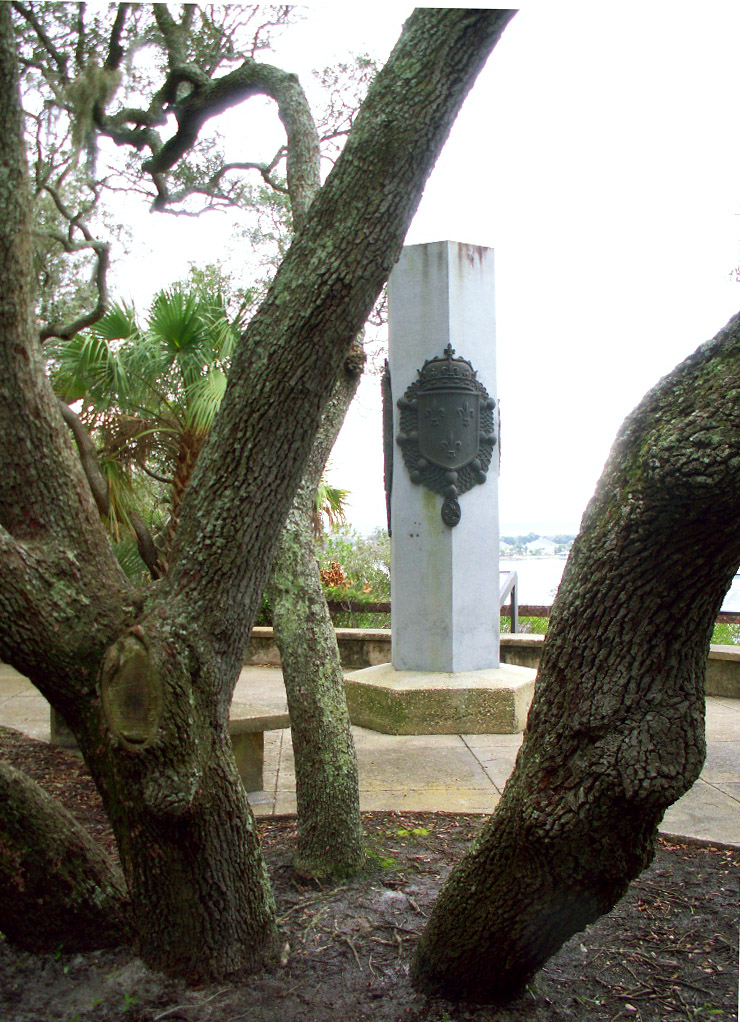
Replica of the French monument at Fort Caroline overlooking the St. Johns River

Though the first European contact in Florida came in 1513 when Juan Ponce de León arrived near Cape Canaveral, not until 1562 did Europeans settle the north Atlantic coast of the peninsula. Early Spanish explorers named the river Rio de Corientes (River of Currents). The St. Johns River became the first place colonized in the region and its first battleground: when French explorer Jean Ribault erected a monument south of the river's mouth to make the French presence known, it alarmed the Spanish who had been exploring the southern and western coast of the peninsula for decades. Ribault was detained after he returned to Europe.

In 1564, René Goulaine de Laudonnière arrived to build Fort Caroline at the mouth of the St. Johns River; they called the river Rivière de Mai because they settled it on May 1. An artist named Jacques LeMoyne documented what he saw among the Timucuan people in 1564, portraying them as physically powerful and not lacking for provisions. Fort Caroline did not last long, though relations with the local Timucua and Mocamas were friendly. The colony was unable to support itself; some of the French deserted. Those who remained were killed in 1565 by the Spanish, led by Pedro Menéndez, when they marched north from St. Augustine and captured Fort Caroline. The river was renamed San Mateo by the Spanish in honor of the Apostle Matthew, whose feast was the following day. Capturing Fort Caroline allowed the Spanish to maintain control of the river.

The French and Spanish continued to spar over who would control the natural resources and native peoples of the territory. The Timucua, who had initially befriended the French, were not encouraged to make the Spanish allies because of colonial governor Pedro Menéndez de Avilés' abhorrence of French Protestantism and his view that the Timucuan beliefs were "Satanic". By 1573, the Timucua were in outright rebellion, testing the governor's patience and forcing Spanish settlers to abandon farms and garrisons in more interior parts of Florida; the Spanish could not persuade the Timucua to keep from attacking them.

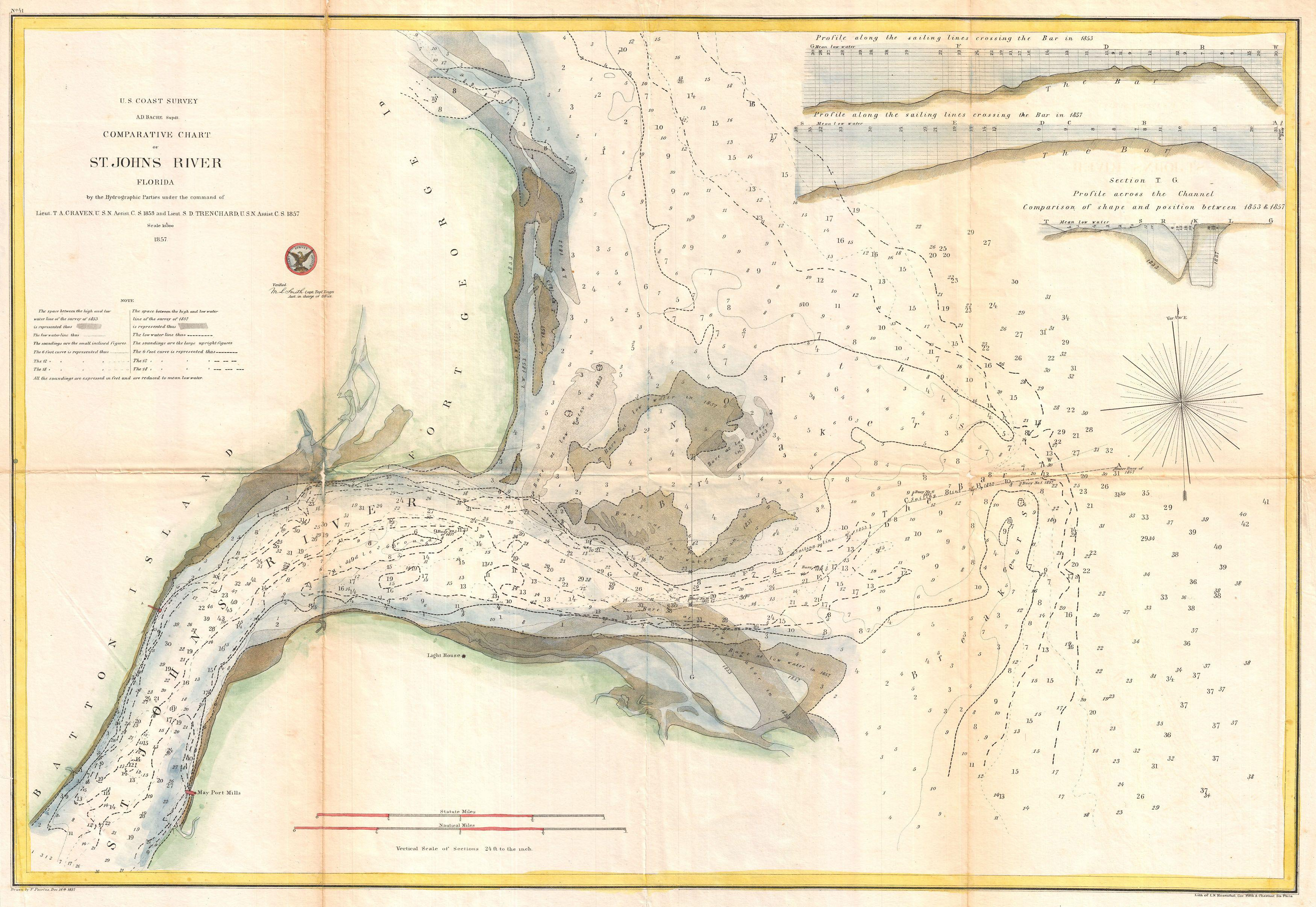
U.S. Coast Survey chart of the Mouth of St. Johns River in 1857

Over a hundred years later, missionaries had more success, setting up posts along the river. Spanish Franciscan missionaries gave the river its current name based on San Juan del Puerto (St. John of the Harbor), the mission established at the river's mouth following the demise of the French fort. The name first appeared on a Spanish map created between 1680 and 1700.

The Timucua, as other groups of indigenous people in Florida, began to lose cohesion and numbers by the 18th century. (Note: In 1717, some of the groups were reorganized by the colonial governor; 248 Timucua were counted. The restructuring also included Yamasee, Mocama, Apalachee, and Guale: in total no more than 1,500 Indians remained in north Florida. Disease and violent conflicts with the Spanish and other tribes continued to decrease their numbers, and by 1763, 100 of the last remaining indigenous people of Florida chose to be relocated to Cuba with the Spanish. (Gannon, p. 94.)) A tribe located in modern-day Georgia and Alabama called the Creeks assisted with this; in 1702, they joined with the Yamasee and attacked some of the Timucua, forcing them to seek protection from the Spanish who forced them into slavery. The Creeks began assimilating other people and spread farther south until they were known by 1765 as Seminoles by the British, a term adapted from cimarrones that meant "runaways" or "wild ones". The Seminoles employed a variety of languages from the peoples the Creeks had assimilated: Hitchiti, Muskogee, as well as Timucua. Between 1716 and 1767, the Seminoles gradually moved into Florida and began to break ties with the Creeks to become a cohesive tribe of their own. The St. Johns provided a natural boundary to separate European colonies on the east bank and indigenous lands west of the river.

William Bartram's sketch of alligators on the St. Johns, created either in 1773 or 1774

After Florida came under the Kingdom of Great Britain's jurisdiction in 1763, Quaker father and son naturalists John and William Bartram explored the length of the river while visiting the southeastern United States from 1765 to 1766. They published journals describing their experiences and the plants and animals they observed. They were charged by King George III to find the source of the river they called the Picolata or San Juan, and measured its widths and depths, taking soil samples as they traveled southward. William returned to Florida from 1773 to 1777 and wrote another journal about his travels, while he collected plants and befriended the Seminoles who called him "Puc Puggy" (flower hunter). William's visit took him as far south as Blue Spring, where he remarked on the crystal clear views offered by the spring water: "The water is perfectly diaphanous, and here are continually a prodigious number and variety of fish; they appear as plain as though lying on a table before your eyes, although many feet deep in the water." Bartram's journals attracted the attention of such prominent Americans as James Madison and Alexander Hamilton. The success of these journals inspired other naturalists such as André Michaux to further explore the St. Johns, as he did in 1788, sailing from Palatka south to Lake Monroe, and gave names to some of the plants described by the Bartrams' journals. Michaux was followed by William Baldwin between 1811 and 1817. Subsequent explorers, including John James Audubon, have carried William's Travels Through North & South Carolina, Georgia, East & West Florida with them as a guide.

In 1795, Florida was transferred back to Spain which lured Americans with cheap land. A former loyalist to Britain who left South Carolina during the American Revolutionary War, a planter and slave trader named Zephaniah Kingsley seized the opportunity and built a plantation named Laurel Grove near what is now Doctors Lake, close to the west bank of the St. Johns River, south of where Orange Park is today. Three years later, Kingsley took a trip to Cuba and purchased a 13-year-old Wolof girl named Anna Madgigine Jai. She became his common-law wife, and managed Laurel Grove while Kingsley traveled and conducted business. The plantation grew citrus and sea island cotton (Gossypium barbadense). In 1814, they moved to a larger plantation on Fort George Island, where they lived for 25 years, and owned several other plantations and homesteads in what is today Jacksonville and another on Drayton Island at the north end of Lake George. Kingsley later married three other freed women in a polygamous relationship; Spanish-controlled Florida allowed interracial marriages, and white landowners such as James Erwin, George Clarke, Francisco Sánchez, John Fraser, and Francis Richard Jr.—early settlers along the river—all were married to or in extramarital relationships with African women.

=== Territorial Florida and statehood ===
Map of the lower St. Johns printed in 1876

The first years following Florida's annexation to the United States in 1821 were marked with violent conflicts between white settlers and Seminoles, whose bands often included runaway African slaves. The clashes between American and Seminole forces during the establishment of the Florida Territory are reflected in the towns and landmarks along the St. Johns named for those who were directly involved. Even before Florida was under U.S. jurisdiction, Major General Andrew Jackson was responsible for removing the Alachua Seminoles west of the Suwannee River, either killing them or forcing them farther south towards Lake County, in 1818. Jackson's efforts became the First Seminole War, and were rewarded by the naming of a cattle crossing across a wide portion of the St. Johns near the Georgia border—previously named Cowford—to Jacksonville. The result of Jackson's offensive was the transfer of Florida to the U.S. (Note: Lake Monroe on the St. Johns was named for President James Monroe, who persuaded the U.S. government to finance the First Seminole War. As American settlers trickled in to farms and homesteads in north and central Florida, they came into increased conflict with several Seminole bands for food and sometimes took the Seminoles as slaves. The Treaty of Moultrie Creek in 1823 placed Seminoles on a reservation near Lake Okeechobee, but further U.S. policy strongly encouraged them to leave Florida for Indian Territory in what would become Oklahoma. (Tebeau, p. 156.) by 1835, the Seminoles rebelled, inspired and led by Osceola, whose name is one of the most widely used for landmarks and structures in the state. (McCarthy, p. 17.) Lake Jesup's namesake is the American military leader in Florida, Major General Thomas Jesup, who captured Osceola in 1837. Lake Harney was named for Brigadier General William S. Harney, who led several raids against Seminoles in west and south Florida. (McCarthy, p. 12.)) Following the Seminole Wars, a gradual increase in commerce and population occurred on the St. Johns, made possible by steamship travel. Steamboats heralded a heyday for the river, and before the advent of local railroads, they were the only way to reach interior portions of the state. They also afforded the citizens of Jacksonville a pastime to watch competing races. By the 1860s, weekly trips between Jacksonville, Charleston, and Savannah were made to transport tourists, lumber, cotton, and citrus. The soil along the St. Johns was considered especially successful for producing sweeter oranges.

Florida's involvement in the U.S. Civil War was limited compared to other Confederate states because it had a fraction of the populations of states that had been developed. Florida provided materials to the Confederacy by way of steamboats on the St. Johns, although the river and the Atlantic coasts were blockaded by the U.S. Navy. One action in Florida's role in the Civil War was the sinking of the USS Columbine, a Union paddle steamer used for patrolling the St. Johns to keep materials from reaching the Confederate Army. In 1864, near Palatka, Confederate forces under the command of Capt. John Jackson Dickison captured, burned, and sank the USS Columbine, making her perhaps the only ship commandeered by the Confederacy. The same year and farther downriver, Confederates again sank a Union boat, the Maple Leaf, which struck a floating keg filled with explosives and settled into the muck near Julington Creek, south of Jacksonville. Part of the shipwreck was recovered in 1994, when it was discovered that many Civil War-era artifacts, including daguerreotypes and wooden matches, had been preserved in the river muck.

Confederate Captain John William Pearson named his militia after the Ocklawaha River called the Ocklawaha Rangers in the American Civil War. Prior to the civil war, Pearson ran a successful health resort in Orange Springs. After the civil war Pearson's Orange Springs resort declined in popularity due to the increasing attention to nearby Silver Springs—the source of the Silver River—at the turn of the 20th century, popularizing the Ocklawaha. Georgia-born poet Sidney Lanier called it "the sweetest waterlane in the world" in a travel guide he published in 1876. The river gave Marjorie Kinnan Rawlings access to the St. Johns from her homestead at Orange Lake. The region served as a major fishing attraction until a decline in water quality occurred in the 1940s, and since then further degradation of the river and its sources have occurred. In particular, Lake Apopka earned the designation of Florida's most polluted lake following a chemical spill in 1980 that dumped DDE in it. It has experienced chronic algal blooms caused by citrus farm fertilizer and wastewater runoff from nearby farms.

Although the Spanish had colonized Florida for two centuries, the state remained the last part of the east coast of the United States to be developed and explored. Following the Civil War, the State of Florida was too far in debt to build roads and rail lines to further its progress. Florida Governor William Bloxham in 1881 appealed directly to a Pennsylvania-based industrialist named Hamilton Disston, initially to build canals to improve steamboat passage through the Caloosahatchee River, and later to drain lands in the central part of the state for agriculture. Disston was furthermore persuaded to purchase 4,000,000 acres (16,000 km^{2}) of land in central Florida for $1 million, which at the time was reported to be the largest purchase of land in human history. Disston was ultimately unsuccessful in his drainage attempts, but his investment sparked the tourist industry and made possible the efforts of railroad magnates Henry Flagler and Henry Plant to construct rail lines down the east coast of Florida, including a rail link between Sanford and Tampa. Disston was responsible for creating the towns of Kissimmee, St. Cloud, and several others on the west coast of Florida.

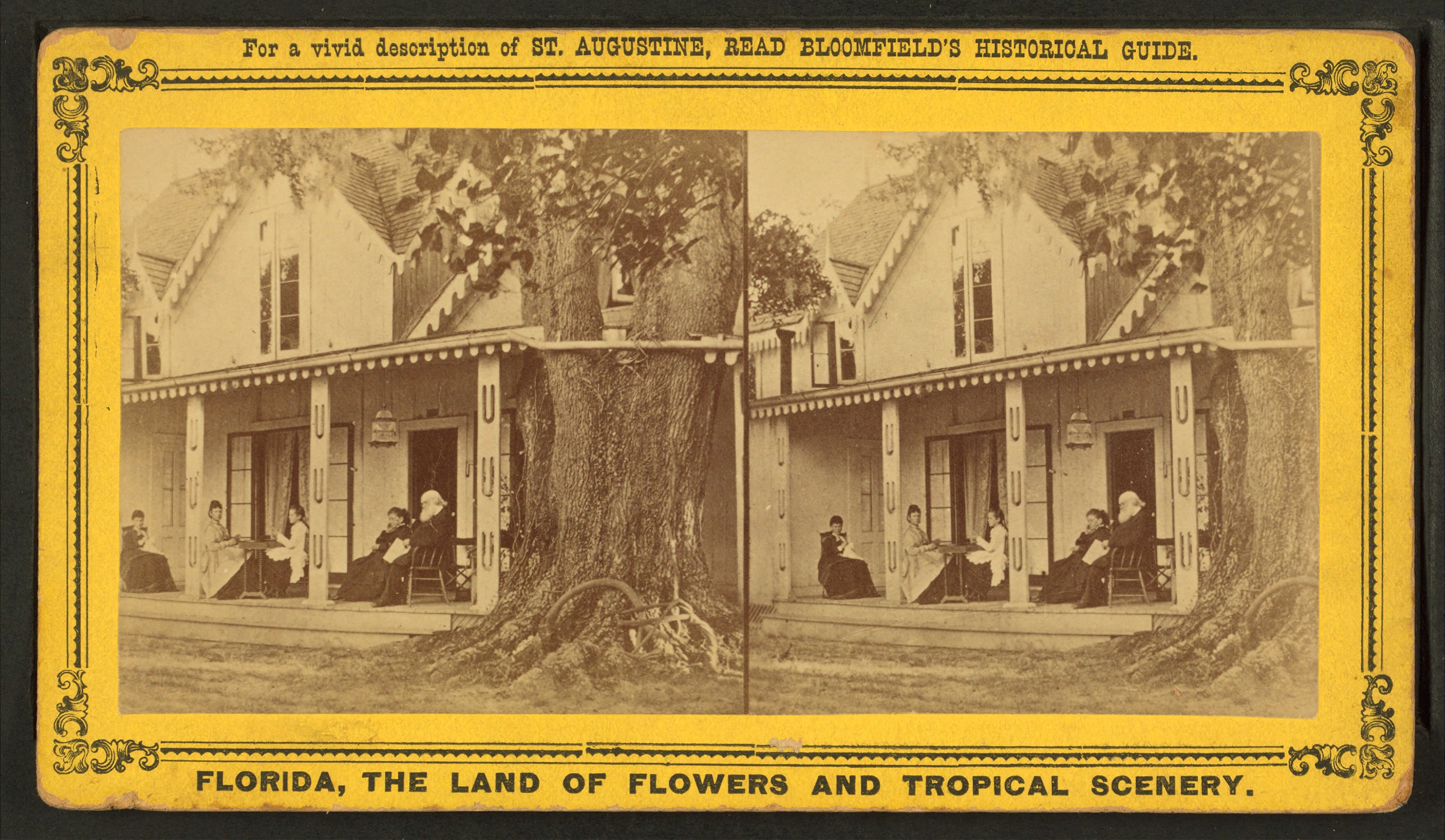
Stereoscopic view of Harriet Beecher Stowe's house in Mandarin

A New York Times story reporting on Disston's progress in 1883 stated that before Disston's purchase and the subsequent development, the only places worth seeing in Florida were Jacksonville and St. Augustine, with perhaps an overnight trip on the St. Johns River to Palatka; by 1883 tourist attractions had extended 250 miles (400 km) south. More attention was paid to the St. Johns with the increasing population. Florida was portrayed as an exotic wonderland able to cure failing health with its water and citrus, and the region began to be highlighted in travel writings. To relieve his bronchitis, Ralph Waldo Emerson stayed briefly in St. Augustine, calling north Florida "a grotesque region" that was being swarmed by land speculators. Emerson poignantly disliked the public sale of slaves, adding to his overall distaste. Following the Civil War, however, famed author Harriet Beecher Stowe lived near Jacksonville and traveled up the St. Johns, writing about it with affection: "The entrance of the St. Johns from the ocean is one of the most singular and impressive passages of scenery that we ever passed through: in fine weather the sight is magnificent." Her memoir Palmetto Leaves, published in 1873 as a series of her letters home, was very influential in luring northern residents to the state.

The results of introducing water hyacinths to Florida, sparking a state-led battle against the invasive plant

One unforeseen aspect of more people coming to Florida proved to be an overwhelming problem. Water hyacinths, possibly introduced in 1884 by Mrs W. W. Fuller, who owned a winter home near Palatka, grow so densely that they are a serious invasive species. By the mid-1890s, the purple-flowered hyacinths had grown to reside in 50,000,000 acres (200,000 km^{2}) of the river and its arteries. The plants prevent the navigation of watercraft, fishing, and sunlight from reaching the depths of the river, affecting both plant and animal life. The government of Florida found the plants to be so vexing that it spent almost $600,000 between 1890 and 1930 in an unsuccessful bid to rid the creeks and rivers of north Florida of them.

=== Land boom ===
Progress of Fellsmere Farms in 1912

An Englishman named Nelson Fell, persuaded by Disston's advertisements to make his fortunes in Florida, arrived in the 1880s. An engineer by trade, Fell purchased 12,000 acres (49 km^{2}) near Lake Tohopekaliga to create a town named Narcoossee, which had a population of more than 200 English immigrants by 1888. A spate of poor luck and tense British-American relations followed, prompting Fell to spend some years investing in infrastructure in Siberia, but he returned in 1909 with ideas of developing wetlands in central Florida. He was further encouraged by the political promises of Governor Napoleon Bonaparte Broward to drain the Everglades during his 1904 campaign. In 1910 Fell purchased 118,000 acres (480 km^{2}) of land for $1.35 an acre and started the Fellsmere Farms Company to drain the St. Johns Marsh in 1911 and send water into the Indian River Lagoon, promoting the engineered canals and other structures as wondrously efficient in providing land to build a massive metropolis. Some progress was made initially, including the establishment of the town of Fellsmere in which land was sold for $100 an acre, but sales lagged because of a scandal regarding land sale fraud and faulty draining reports from the Everglades. The company then found itself short of funds due to mismanagement. Torrential rains ruptured the newly constructed levees and dikes and forced the company by 1916 to go into receivership. Fell left Florida for Virginia in 1917.

Marjorie Kinnan Rawlings used the St. Johns as a backdrop in her books South Moon Under and The Yearling, and several short stories. In 1933 she took a boat trip along the St. Johns with a friend. In the upper basin, she remarked on the difficulty of determining direction due to the river's ambiguous flow, and wrote in a chapter titled "Hyacinth Drift" in her memoir Cross Creek that she had the best luck in watching the way the hyacinths floated. Rawlings wrote, "If I could have, to hold forever, one brief place and time of beauty, I think I might choose the night on that high lonely bank above the St. Johns River." (Note: When Rawlings and her friend stopped in Sanford to purchase gasoline, a yacht owner offered to have his crew take her to town to buy it, but he was interrupted when his wife, resplendent in a "pink spectator sports costume", demanded he take her to church instead. As Rawlings left the dock at Sanford, her friend remarked, "The poor b—. I bet he'd give his silk shirt to go down the river with us instead of Pink Petticoats". (Rawlings, p. 366.))

Florida in the 20th century experienced a massive migration into the state. Undeveloped land sold well and draining to reclaim wetlands has often gone unchecked, and often encouraged by government. The St. Johns headwaters decreased in size from 30 square miles (78 km^{2}) to one between 1900 and 1972. Much of the land was reclaimed for urban use, but agricultural needs took their toll as fertilizers and runoff from cattle ranching washed into the St. Johns. Without wetlands to filter the pollutants, the chemicals stayed in the river and flushed into the Atlantic Ocean. Boaters destroyed the floating islands of muck and weeds in the upper basin with dynamite, causing the lakes to drain completely.

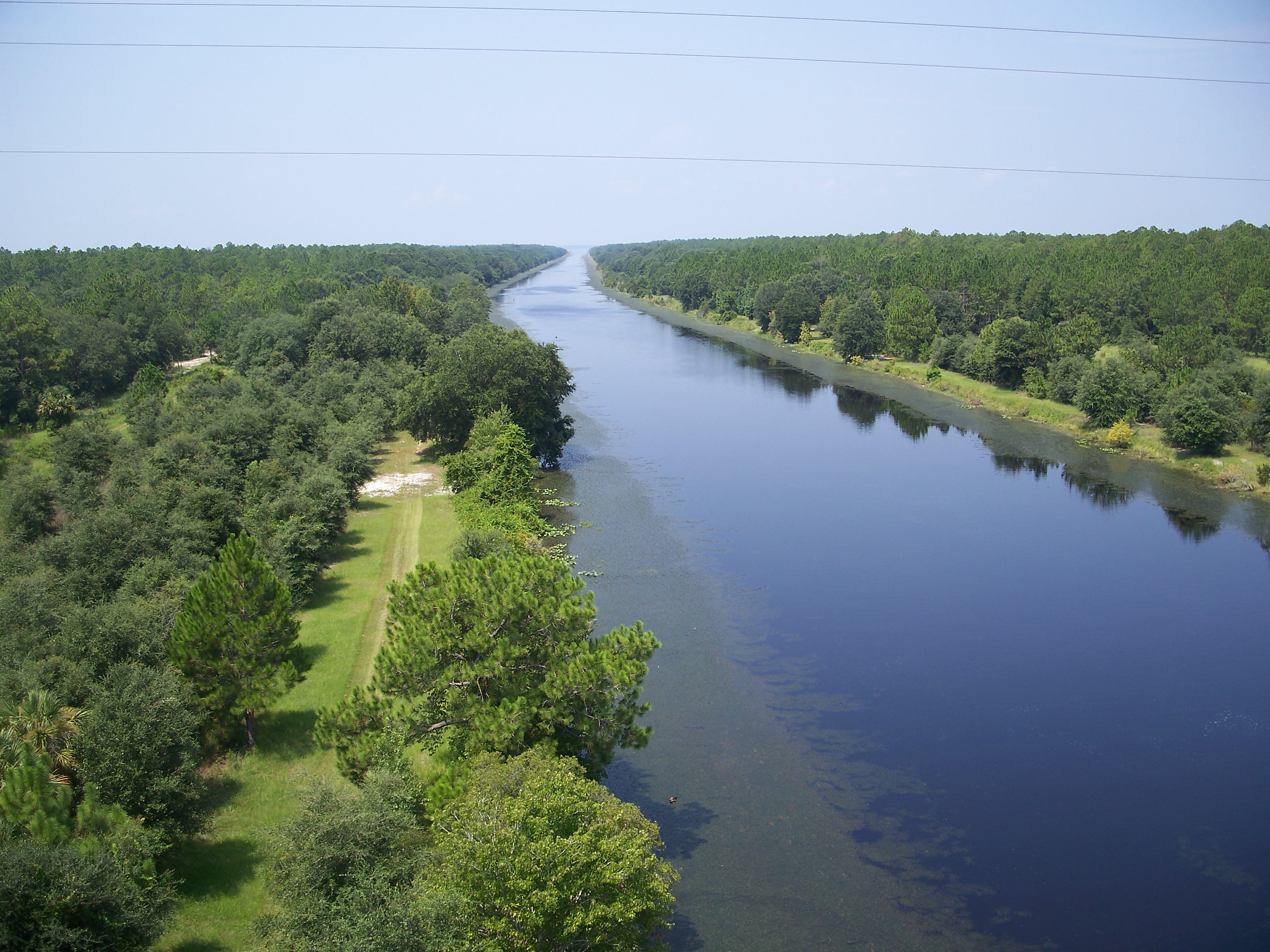
A portion of the completed Cross Florida Barge Canal near Palatka

What could have been the most serious human impact on nature in central Florida was the Cross Florida Barge Canal, an attempt to connect the Gulf and Atlantic coasts of the state by channeling the Ocklawaha River, first authorized in 1933. (Note: Author and University of Florida professor Kevin McCarthy characterized the Cross Florida Barge Canal as "probably the single most dangerous threat to the water resources of the state in the twentieth century". (McCarthy, p. 76.)) The canal was intended to be 171 miles (275 km) long, 250 feet (76 m) wide, and 30 feet (9.1 m) deep. Canal construction was top among the engineering priorities in the state, and by 1964 the U.S. Army Corps of Engineers began construction on the Cross Florida Barge Canal. Flood control was the primary impetus behind its construction, though the broader reasoning and feasibility of the project remained unclear. The Army Corps of Engineers was also constructing hundreds of miles of canals in the Everglades at the same time and by the 1960s was being accused of wasting tax money through its unnecessary construction projects. In 1969 the Environmental Defense Fund filed suit in federal court to stop construction on the canal, citing irreparable harm that would be done to Florida waterways and the Floridan Aquifer, central and north Florida's fresh water source.

A separate canal, the St. Johns-Indian River Barge Canal, was planned to link the river with the Intracoastal Waterway; the project never broke ground, and was canceled soon after the Cross Florida Barge Canal was suspended.

=== Restoration ===
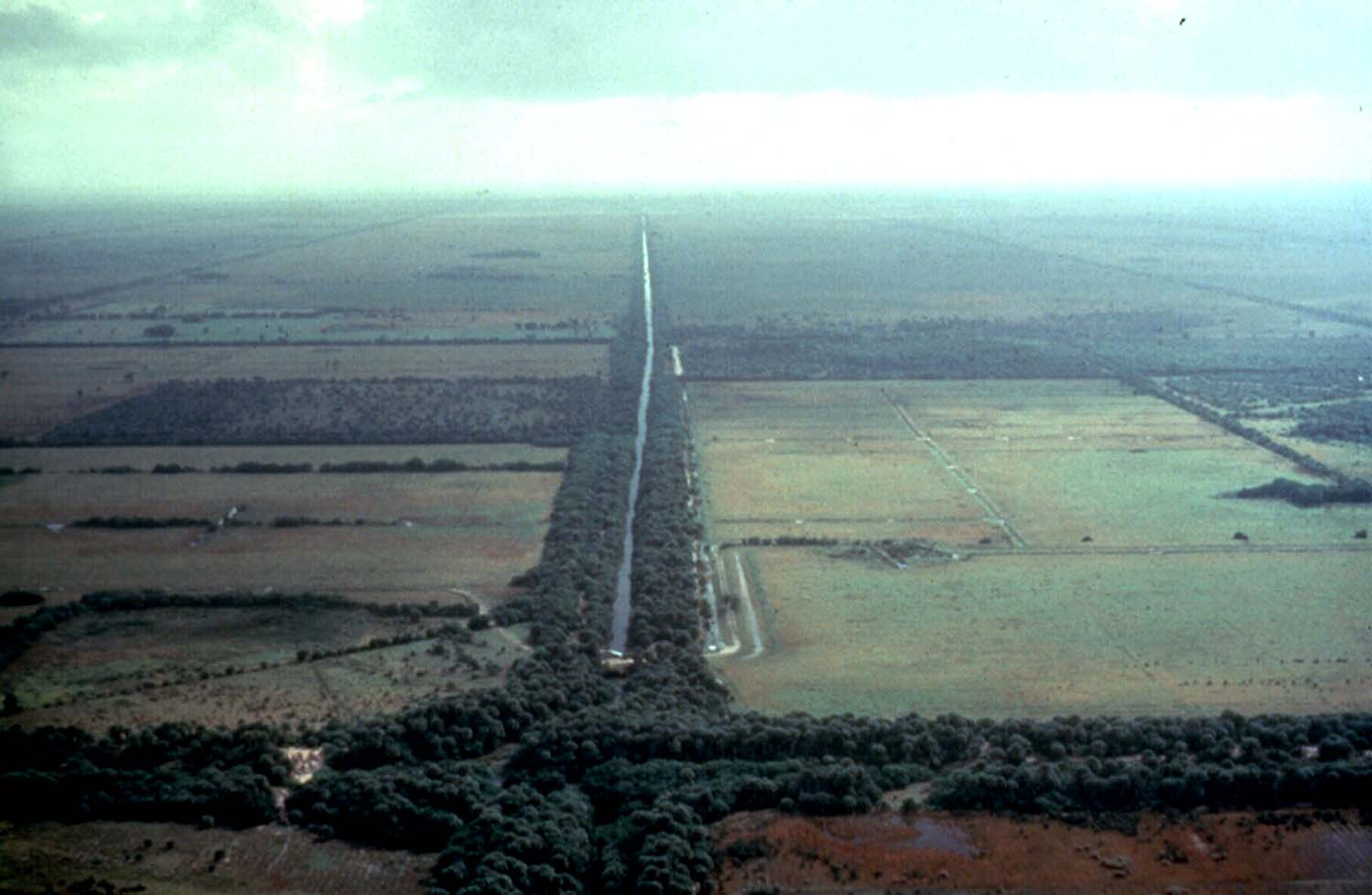
Former headwater marshes drained for agricultural use near Brevard and Indian River Counties

When steamboats were superseded by the railroad, the river lost much of its significance to the state. The influx of immigrants to Florida settled primarily south of Orlando, adversely affecting the natural order of wetlands there. Within the past 50 years, however, urban areas in the northern and central parts of the state have grown considerably. In the upper basin, population increased by 700 percent between 1950 and 2000, and is expected to rise another 1.5 million by 2020.

Nitrates and phosphorus used as lawn and crop fertilizers wash into the St. Johns. Broken septic systems and seepage from cattle grazing lands create pollution that also finds its way into the river. Storm water washes from street drains directly to the river and its tributaries: in the 1970s, the Econlockhatchee River received 8,000,000 US gallons (30,000,000 L) of treated wastewater every day. Wetlands were drained and paved, unable to filter pollutants from the water, made worse by the river's own slow discharge. Algal blooms, fish kills, and deformations and lesions on fish occur regularly in the river from Palatka to Jacksonville. Although most of the pollutants in the river are washed from the southern parts of the river, the Jacksonville area produces approximately 36 percent of them found in the lower basin.

The State of Florida implemented a program named Surface Water Improvement and Management (SWIM) in 1987 to assist with river cleanups, particularly with nonpoint source pollution, or chemicals that enter the river by soaking into the ground, as opposed to direct piped dumping. SWIM assists local jurisdictions with purchasing land for wetlands restoration. The St. Johns River Water Management District (SJRWMD) is charged by the Florida Department of Environmental Protection (DEP) with restoring the river. The first step in restoration, particularly in the upper basin, is the purchase of public lands bordering the river; ten different reserves and conservation areas have been implemented for such use around the St. Johns headwaters. Around Lake Griffin in the Ocklawaha Chain of Lakes, the SJRWMD has purchased 6,500 acres (26 km^{2}) of land that was previously used for muck farming. More than 19,000 acres (77 km^{2}) have been purchased along Lake Apopka to restore its wetlands, and the SJRWMD has removed nearly 15,000,000 pounds (6,800,000 kg) of gizzard shad (Dorosoma cepedianum), a fish species that stores phosphorus and adds to algae problems. The SJRWMD has also set minimum levels for the lakes and tributaries in the St. Johns watersheds to monitor permitted water withdrawals and declare water shortages when necessary.

To assist with river cleanup and the associated funds for improving water quality in the St. Johns, Mayor John Delaney of Jacksonville waged a campaign to get it named as an American Heritage River, beginning in 1997. The designation by the Environmental Protection Agency is intended to coordinate efforts among federal agencies to improve natural resource and environmental protection, economic revitalization, and historic and cultural preservation. The campaign was controversial as the Republican mayor defended asking for federal government assistance, writing "Other rivers have relied heavily on federal help for massive environmental clean-ups. It's the St. Johns' turn now." Twenty-two towns along the St. Johns and environmental, sporting, recreation, boating, and educational organizations also supported its designation, but several prominent Republican politicians expressed concerns over increased federal regulations and restrictions on private property ownership along the river; the Florida House of Representatives passed a resolution asking President Bill Clinton not to include the St. Johns. Despite this, Clinton designated the St. Johns as one of only 14 American Heritage Rivers out of 126 nominated in 1998 for its ecological, historic, economic and cultural significance.

The continuing increase of population in Florida has caused urban planners to forecast that the Floridan Aquifer will no longer be able to sustain the people living in north Florida. By 2020, 7 million people are predicted to live in the St. Johns basins, double the number living there in 2008. Proposals to use 155,000,000 US gallons (590,000,000 L) a day from the St. Johns, and another 100,000,000 US gallons (380,000,000 L) from the Ocklawaha River, for fresh water are controversial, prompting a private organization named St. Johns Riverkeeper to nominate it to the list of the Ten Most Endangered Rivers by an environmental watchdog group named American Rivers. In 2008, it was listed as #6, which was met with approval from Jacksonville's newspaper, The Florida Times-Union, and skepticism from the SJRWMD.

The St. Johns River is under consideration as an additional water source to meet growing public water needs. In 2008, the river's Water Management District undertook a Water Supply Impact Study of the proposed water withdrawals and asked the National Research Council to review science aspects of the study as it progressed. This resulted in a series of four reports that assessed the impact of water withdrawal on river level and flow, reviewed potential impacts on wetland ecosystems, and presented overall perspectives on the Water Management District study. The National Research Council found that, overall, the District performed a competent job in relating predicted environmental responses, including their magnitude and general degree of uncertainty, to the proposed range of water withdrawals. However, the report noted that the District's final report should acknowledge such critical issues as include future sea-level rises, population growth, and urban development. Although the District predicted that changes in water management would increase water levels and flows that exceed the proposed surface water withdrawals, these predictions have high uncertainties.

The report also noted concerns about the District's conclusion that the water withdrawals will have few deleterious ecological effects. This conclusion was based on the model findings that increased flows from upper basin projects and from changes in land use (increases in impervious areas) largely compensated for the impacts of water withdrawals on water flows and levels. Although the upper basin projects are positive insofar as they will return land to the basin (and water to the river), the same cannot be said about increased urban runoff, the poor quality of which is well known.

== See also ==
- List of lakes of the St. Johns River
- List of crossings of the St. Johns River
- List of Florida rivers
- List of rivers of the Americas by coastline
- South Atlantic-Gulf Water Resource Region

== Bibliography ==
- Belleville, Bill (2000). River of Lakes: A Journey on Florida's St. Johns River, University of Georgia Press. ISBN 0-8203-2156-7
- Benke, Arthur; Cushing, Colbert (eds.) (2005). Rivers of North America, Elsevier/Academic Press. ISBN 0-12-088253-1
- Cabell, Branch and Hanna, A. J. (1943). The St. Johns: A Parade of Diversities, Farrar & Rinehart, Rivers of America Series.
- Gannon, Michael (ed.) (1996). A New History of Florida, University Press of Florida. ISBN 0-8130-1415-8
- McCarthy, Kevin (2004). St. Johns River Guidebook, Pineapple Press. ISBN 1-56164-314-9
- Miller, James (1998). An Environmental History of Northeast Florida, University Press of Florida. ISBN 0-8130-2313-0
- Noll, Steven and Tegeder, M. David (August 2003). From Exploitation to Conservation: A History of the Marjorie Harris Carr Cross Florida Greenway hosted at the Florida Department of Environmental Protection website. Retrieved on July 19, 2009.
- Randazzo, Anthony and Jones, Douglas (eds.) (1997). The Geology of Florida. University Press of Florida. ISBN 0-8130-1496-4
- Rawlings, Marjorie (1942). Cross Creek, First Touchstone Edition 1996: Simon & Schuster. ISBN 0-684-81879-5
- Read, William Alexander (2004). Florida Place Names of Indian Origin and Seminole Personal Names, University of Alabama Press. ISBN 978-0-8173-8421-0
- Schafer, Daniel L. (March 2003). Anna Madgigine Jai Kingsley: African Princess, Florida Slave, Plantation Slaveowner. University Press of Florida. ISBN 0-8130-2616-4
- Simpson, J Clarence; Boyd, Mark F. (ed.) (1956). A Provisional Gazetteer of Florida Place-names of Indian Derivation. Florida Geological Survey, Special Publication No. 1.
- Stowe, Harriet B. (1873). Palmetto-Leaves. J. R. Osgood and Company.
- Tebeau, Charlton (1971). A History of Florida, University of Miami Press. ISBN 0-87024-149-4
- Whitney, Ellie; Means, D. Bruce; Rudloe, Anne (eds.) (2004) Priceless Florida: Natural Ecosystems and Native Species. Pineapple Press, Inc. ISBN 978-1-56164-309-7
- Young, Claiborne (1996). Cruising Guide to Eastern Florida, Pelican Publishing Company. ISBN 0-88289-992-9
