= Taylor Creek, Florida =

Unincorporated community in Florida, US

- CDP
- Location in Okeechobee County and the state of Florida
- Coordinates: 27°13′02″N 80°47′33″W
- Country: United States
- State: Florida
- County: Okeechobee

Area
  - Total: 3.44 sq mi (8.91 km^{2})
  - Land: 3.05 sq mi (7.89 km^{2})
  - Water: 0.39 sq mi (1.01 km^{2})
- Elevation: 16 ft (4.9 m)

Population (2020)
  - Total: 4,470
  - Density: 1,466.4/sq mi (566.19/km^{2})
- Time zone: UTC-5 (Eastern (EST))
  - Summer (DST): UTC-4 (EDT)
- ZIP code: 34974
- Area code: 863
- FIPS code: 12-71300
- GNIS feature ID: 2402917

Taylor Creek is a census-designated place (CDP) in Okeechobee County, Florida, United States. As of the 2020 census, Taylor Creek had a population of 4,470.

== Geography ==
The community lies along the north side of Lake Okeechobee. The area is served by US routes 98 and 441 and state routes 700 and 15.

According to the United States Census Bureau, the CDP has a total area of 4.2 square miles (11 km^{2}), of which 4.0 square miles (10 km^{2}) is land and 0.2 square miles (0.52 km^{2}) (3.61%) is water.

== History ==
In 1855, Taylor Creek was the site for a meeting of Seminole. The aim of the meeting was to discuss how the confederation should respond to increasing pressure from the United States government, and the result was the start of the Third Seminole War.

In October 1896, the first Euro-American settlers, Peter and Louisiana Raulerson, moved down to the area from Fort Basinger, Florida.

== Demographics ==
Historical population
Census	Pop.	Note	%±
2000	4,289		—
2010	4,348		1.4%
2020	4,470		2.8%
U.S. Decennial Census

=== 2020 census ===
As of the 2020 census, Taylor Creek had a population of 4,470. The median age was 53.6 years. 16.4% of residents were under the age of 18 and 31.3% of residents were 65 years of age or older. For every 100 females there were 101.1 males, and for every 100 females age 18 and over there were 97.9 males age 18 and over.

97.6% of residents lived in urban areas, while 2.4% lived in rural areas.

There were 2,100 households in Taylor Creek, of which 19.4% had children under the age of 18 living in them. Of all households, 37.6% were married-couple households, 26.2% were households with a male householder and no spouse or partner present, and 26.4% were households with a female householder and no spouse or partner present. About 35.4% of all households were made up of individuals and 21.0% had someone living alone who was 65 years of age or older.

There were 3,018 housing units, of which 30.4% were vacant. The homeowner vacancy rate was 2.9% and the rental vacancy rate was 13.5%.

Racial composition as of the 2020 census
Race	Number	Percent
White	3,877	86.7%
Black or African American	84	1.9%
American Indian and Alaska Native	24	0.5%
Asian	57	1.3%
Native Hawaiian and Other Pacific Islander	0	0.0%
Some other race	206	4.6%
Two or more races	222	5.0%
Hispanic or Latino (of any race)	519	11.6%

=== 2000 census ===
As of the 2000 census, there were 4,289 people, 2,022 households, and 1,277 families residing in the CDP. The population density was 1,073.2 inhabitants per square mile (414.4/km^{2}). There were 2,775 housing units at an average density of 694.4 per square mile (268.1/km^{2}). The racial makeup of the CDP was 94.54% White, 0.26% African American, 0.42% Native American, 0.61% Asian, 0.05% Pacific Islander, 3.12% from other races, and 1.00% from two or more races. Hispanic or Latino of any race were 5.15% of the population.

There were 2,022 households, out of which 14.7% had children under the age of 18 living with them, 52.4% were married couples living together, 6.6% had a female householder with no husband present, and 36.8% were non-families. 29.6% of all households were made up of individuals, and 16.2% had someone living alone who was 65 years of age or older. The average household size was 2.12 and the average family size was 2.54.

In the CDP, the population was spread out, with 14.6% under the age of 18, 5.9% from 18 to 24, 18.2% from 25 to 44, 28.1% from 45 to 64, and 33.1% who were 65 years of age or older. The median age was 55 years. For every 100 females, there were 103.5 males. For every 100 females age 18 and over, there were 101.0 males.

The median income for a household in the CDP was $24,919, and the median income for a family was $28,260. Males had a median income of $23,810 versus $22,500 for females. The per capita income for the CDP was $16,754. About 10.1% of families and 15.2% of the population were below the poverty line, including 22.8% of those under age 18 and 6.2% of those age 65 or over.

== Education ==
The sole school district in the county is Okeechobee County School District.
