= Half Moon Lake =

Half Moon Lake or Halfmoon Lake may refer to:

== Lakes ==
In Canada

- Half Moon Lake (Alberta), Canada
  - Half Moon Lake, Alberta, a hamlet and resort on the lake
- Half Moon Lake (Ontario) in Parry Sound District, Ontario
- Halfmoon Lake (Nipissing District), Ontario
- Halfmoon Lake (Algoma District), Ontario
- Halfmoon Lake (Kenora District), Ontario
- Halfmoon Lake (Cochrane District), Ontario
- Halfmoon Lake (Rainy River District), Ontario

In the United States

- Half Moon Lake in Bossier Parish, Louisiana
- Half Moon Lake in Calhoun County, Arkansas
- Half Moon Lake in Desha County, Arkansas
- Half Moon Lake in Mississippi County, Arkansas
- Halfmoon Lake (Florida)
- Half Moon Lake (Berrien County, Michigan)
- Half Moon Lake (Meeker County, Minnesota)
- Halfmoon Lake (Barnstead, New Hampshire)
- Half Moon Lake (Polk County, Wisconsin) a water body near Milltown, Wisconsin, United States
