= Billies Bay Wilderness =

Part of a national forest located Florida

- IUCN category Ib (wilderness area)
- Location within the United States
- Location: Lake County, Florida, USA
- Nearest city: Astor, Florida
- Coordinates: 29°05′39″N 81°35′15″W
- Area: 3,092 acres (13 km^{2})
- Established: September 28, 1984
- Governing body: U.S. Forest Service

The Billies Bay Wilderness is part of Ocala National Forest. The 3,092-acre (13 km^{2}) wilderness was established on September 28, 1984. The mostly marshy and swampy nature of the area is indicated by the word 'bay' as part of the name, since this is a Floridian term for swamp. It contributes to the headwaters of Alexander Springs Creek in the nearby Alexander Springs Wilderness.

== Flora ==
Plants in the area include red maple, bay, sweet gum, cabbage palm, sand live oak (Quercus geminata), sandhill oak (Quercus inopina), myrtle oak (Quercus myrtifolia), Chapman's oak (Quercus chapmanii), palmetto, gallberry, longleaf, loblolly pine, slash and sand pine.
