= Ocala National Forest =

National forest located in Florida, United States

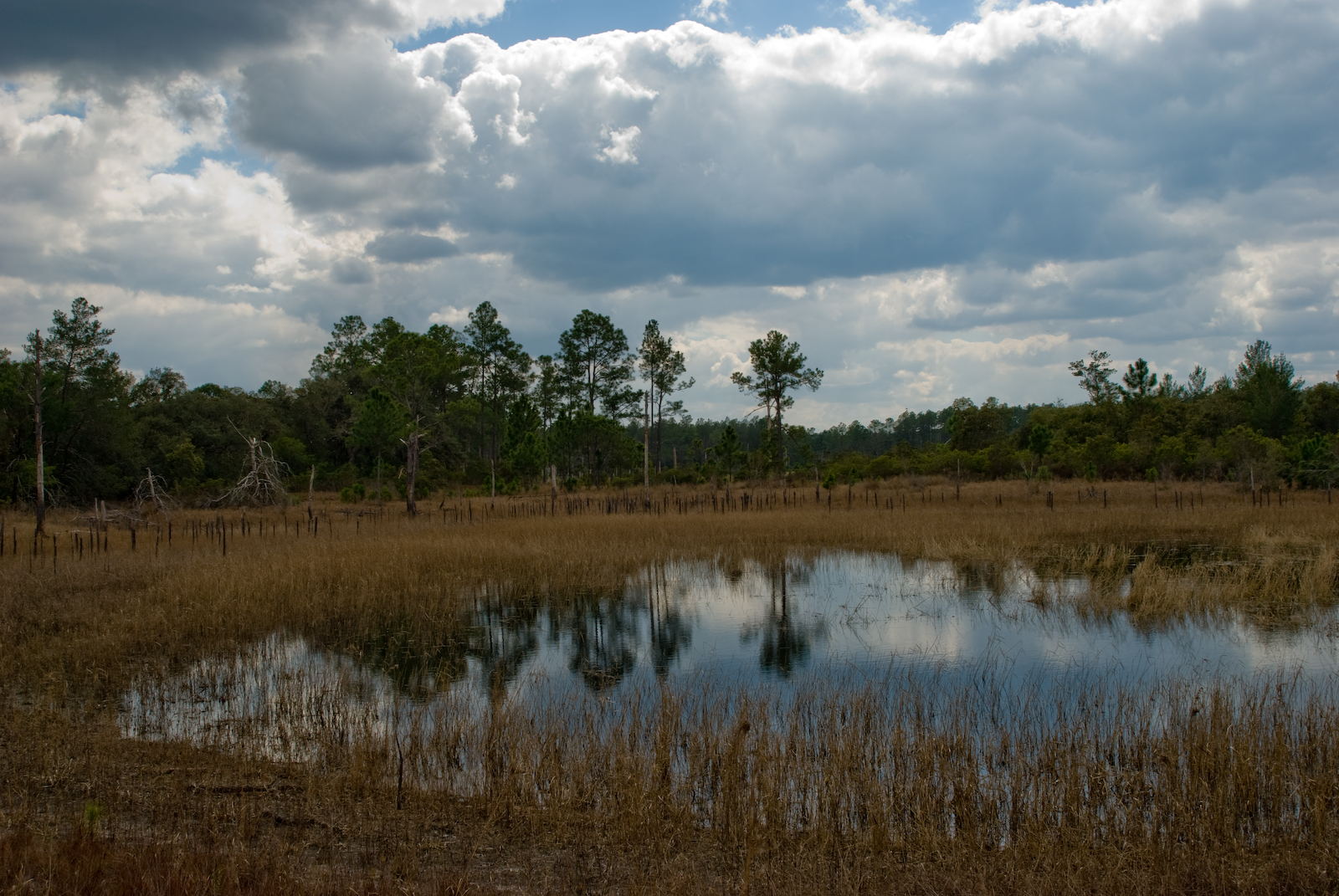
- Farles Prairie in Ocala National Forest

- Location within Florida Location within the United States
- Location: Florida, U.S.
- Nearest city: Ocala, FL
- Coordinates: 29°10′25″N 81°49′18″W
- Area: 430,447 acres (1,741.96 km^{2})
- Max. elevation: 193 ft (59 m): 29.0518, -81.6858
- Established: 1908
- Governing body: U.S. Forest Service
- Website: Ocala National Forest

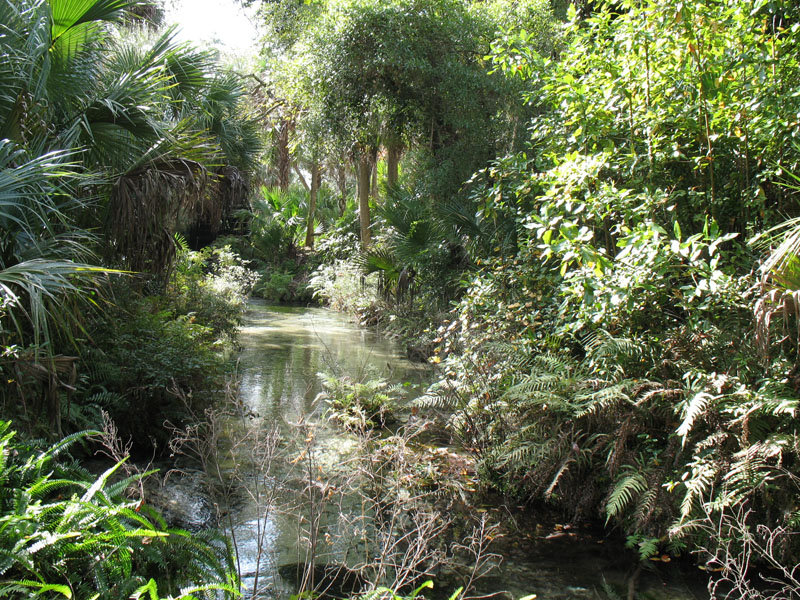
Juniper Springs in the Ocala National Forest

The Ocala National Forest is the second largest nationally protected forest in the U.S. State of Florida. It covers 607 square miles (1,570 km^{2}) of North Central Florida. It is located three miles (4.8 km) east of Ocala and 16 miles (26 km) southeast of Gainesville. The Ocala National Forest, established in 1908, is the oldest national forest east of the Mississippi River and the southernmost national forest in the continental U.S. The word Ocala is thought to be a derivative of a Timucuan term meaning "fair land" or "big hammock". The forest is headquartered in Tallahassee, as are all three National Forests in Florida, but there are local ranger district offices located in Silver Springs and Umatilla.

== History ==
Prehistoric Florida was underwater, various sea life would live within the areas that would now be the Ocala National Forest. The calcium in the decomposing fish bones and shells were a major component in the limestone.

Due to the ridges in the limestone having a higher elevation than the coast caused the area around the Ocala National Forest to be one of the first areas in the Floridian Peninsula to dry up and provide shelter for semi-aquatic animals.

The first humans to inhabit the Ocala National Forest were the Paleo-Indians. Various burial sites have been found, the oldest being about 12,000 years old.

In the 1950s and 1960s a group of archeologists uncovered three archeological sites in the Ocala National Forest.

== Geography ==
The Ocala National Forest lies between the Ocklawaha and St. Johns rivers in North Florida. In descending order of land area, it is located in parts of Marion, Lake, and Putnam counties.

The Ocala Forest is also known for having over 600 natural lakes and ponds. Between the river boundaries of this Forest lie central highlands, coastal lowlands, swamps, springs, and hundreds of lakes and ponds. Near the Juniper Prairie Wilderness and Juniper Springs is "The Yearling Trail", the location where The Yearling was filmed.

The Ocala National Forest receives more visitors than any other national forest in the Sunshine State. Millions visit the forest annually, which is one of North Florida's last-remaining traces of forested land. The forest's porous sands, and largely undeveloped lands, provide an important recharge for the Floridan Aquifer. The Rodman Reservoir system forms most of the northern and northwestern border as part of the Ocklawaha River Basin.

The United States Navy's Pinecastle Bombing Range in the Ocala National Forest is the only place on the East Coast where the Navy can do live impact training. The Navy drops nearly 20,000 bombs a year at the site, a few hundred of which are live. The Pinecastle Bombing Range is a fenced 5,760 acres (23.3 km^{2}) area, with the eastern edge of the range located about 2 miles (3.2 km) west of State Road 19 and the Camp Ocala campgrounds, and one-half mile (800 m) west of the Farles Lake campground. F/A-18 Hornet jet fighters and other aircraft take off from Naval Air Station Jacksonville or from aircraft carriers off the Florida coast, fly low over the forest, and drop their bombs in the middle 450 acres (1.8 km^{2}) of the range. P-3 Orion and P-8 Poseidon aircraft will also use an instrumented range in the southeast quadrant of Lake George to conduct aerial mining training utilizing inert 500lb mines. All air-to-ground exercises using conventional ordnance up to and including 500 pounds (230 kg) MK 82 bombs and five-inch (127 mm) Zuni rockets are authorized. Napalm and High Explosive Incendiary (HEI) are prohibited. Live ordnance is restricted to the Live Ordnance Impact Area; inert ordnance is used on all other targets. Pinecastle targets have also been certified for laser operations. The Navy has used the area for target practice for 50 years under a special use permit from the U.S. Forest Service.

The ghost town of Kerr City is in the forest. It is located on County Road 316 just west of State Road 19.

The historic Carr Family Cabin resides within the forest.

== Ecology ==
The Ocala National Forest is in the southeastern conifer forests and the Florida scrub ecoregions. Dry, sandy areas support Florida longleaf pine sandhills (also called "high pine") and Florida scrub. Longleaf pine sandhills are woodlands dominated by longleaf pine. Florida scrub consists of a more or less dense shrub layer often with a tree canopy of sand pines. Both of these pine communities are sustained by frequent fires. The Ocala National Forest contains a high proportion of remaining inland scrub habitat and is noted for its sand pine scrub ecosystem. The forest contains the largest concentration of sand pine in the world as well as some of the best remaining stands of longleaf pine in northern Florida. Where fire is absent, southern coastal plain oak domes and hammocks can grow. These are small stands of thick evergreen oaks.

The forest contains several slow-moving rivers and numerous wet "prairies". Blackwater rivers support southern coastal plain blackwater river floodplain forests of baldcypress (Taxodium distichum) along their banks. The forest's spring-fed rivers support southern coastal plain hydric hammocks, hammocks of evergreen and hardwood trees, near their floodplains. The prairies are Floridian highlands freshwater marshes. Southern coastal plain nonriverine basin swamps are large, seasonally flooded depressions of baldcypress (Taxodium distichum) and swamp tupelo (Nyssa biflora).

=== Big Scrub ===
The Big Scrub (earlier called the Etonia scrub) is a large area of Florida scrub, about 40 miles (64 km) long and 15 to 20 miles (24 to 32 km) wide, including about 200,000 acres (312 sq mi; 809 km^{2}) of scrub habitat, out of the 366,037 acres (572 sq mi; 1,481 km^{2}) in the national forest. It has been described as a sea of scrub with islands of high pine (Florida longleaf pine sandhill), while elsewhere in Florida patches of scrub have been described as islands occurring in a sea of high pine. The shrub layer of the Big Scrub generally consists of several evergreen oaks and other woody shrubs, some of which are not commonly found elsewhere in Florida scrub patches. (Note: Common members of the shrub layer in the Big Scrub include Chapman oak, myrtle oak, southern live oak, saw palmetto, scrub palmetto, rusty lyonia, rusty staggerbush, shiny blueberry, dwarf huckleberry, dangleberry, Carolina holly, American holly, gallberry, Florida rosemary, garberia, and American olive.)

Marjorie Kinnan Rawlings lived much of her adult life just a few miles north of the Big Scrub in Cross Creek, Florida. She reported that the only inhabitants of the area lived in hammocks along streams or next to lakes, but not in the scrub itself. Rawlings based some of her writings (including South Moon Under and The Yearling) on the lives of the settlers around the Big Scrub after staying with families there. She described the Big Scrub in detail, stating that it was unique in the world. She wrote, "There is no human habitation—there never has been and probably never will be—in the scrub itself." She called the scrub "a vast wall, keeping out the timid and the alien." Patrick D. Smith, in writing about Rawlings, stated about the Big Scrub, "In all of America there is not a more wild and hostile land."

Periodic fires are necessary for the long term maintenance of Florida scrub. Fires in scrub are intense, killing sand pine trees and burning shrubs to the ground. A fire started by a lightning strike in the Big Scrub in 1935 became the fastest spreading wildfire in the history of the United States Forest Service. The fire consumed 35,000 acres (55 sq mi; 140 km^{2}) in four hours, spreading at 6 miles per hour (9.7 km/h). The Forest Service now conducts periodic burns in the Big Scrub after sand pines have been harvested from an area.

=== Animals ===
Ocala has a wide variety of wildlife. The Florida black bear population has its highest concentration here, and West Indian manatees frequent the inland waterways. Alligators, boar, bobcat, coyote, and white-tailed deer are all common. There are also numerous smaller animals, including (several types of) bats, eastern gray squirrels, gray fox, opossum, raccoon, red fox, nine-banded armadillo, river otter, striped skunks and southeastern pocket gophers. The sandy soil is home to the endangered gopher frog and gopher tortoise, whose extensive burrows provide important refuge for many other mammals, reptiles and amphibians. Herpetiles are abundant at Ocala, including species such as the barking frog, bullfrog, coachwhip, corn snake, brown and banded watersnakes, common snapping turtle, eastern coralsnakes, diamondback rattlesnakes, fence lizards, musk turtles, spadefoot toads and yellow ratsnakes, Florida cottonmouths, Florida crowned snake, redbelly turtles, scrub lizards and softshell turtles, garter snakes, green anole (as well as the invasive brown anole), little brown skink, North American green treefrogs and racers, oak toads, peninsula cooter, pig frogs, pine snakes, pine woods tree frogs, pond sliders, pygmy rattlesnakes, ribbon snakes, ring-necked snakes, rough green snakes, the scarletsnake, six-lined racerunner, squirrel treefrogs, and southern five-lined skinks, southern leopard frogs and southern toads. An introduced population of Asian Rhesus macaques, originally a tourist attraction at Silver Springs State Park, have also ranged into the region and are occasionally seen.

== Activities ==
The Ocala National Forest has an accommodating climate for year-round recreation. The mild winters are fine for family camping while a summer canoe trip down a palm-lined stream is a cool way to spend an August day. The temperatures for the dry months of November through February range from a daily average of 50 °F (10 °C) to a high of 72 °F (22 °C). The summer season is much warmer and wetter. Short afternoon thundershowers often raise the humidity to about 90% while the temperatures range from 80 to 95 °F (27 to 35 °C). The average rainfall is approximately 55 inches (1,400 mm) per year.

Water plays an important part in a variety of recreational opportunities in the forest. Activities range from canoeing, boating, fishing, skiing, snorkeling, scuba diving, swimming, and the use of personal watercraft. Several boat ramps are available in the forest.

=== Hiking ===
Many hiking trails run through the forest including the Florida Trail, Salt Springs Observation Trail, Lake Eaton Sinkhole Trail, St. Francis Trail, and Yearling Trail.

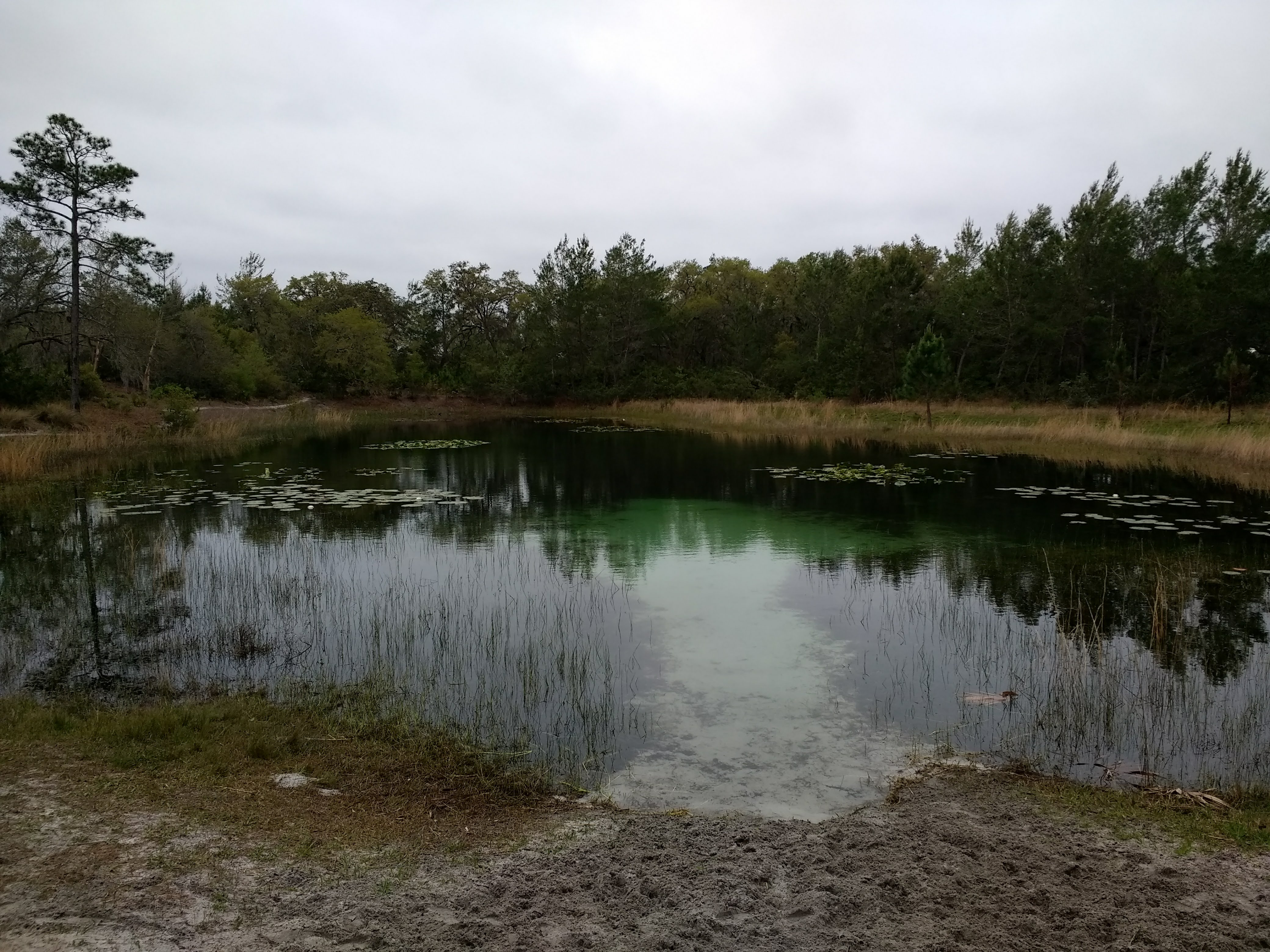
Hidden Pond in the Juniper Prairie Wilderness portion of the Ocala National Forest.

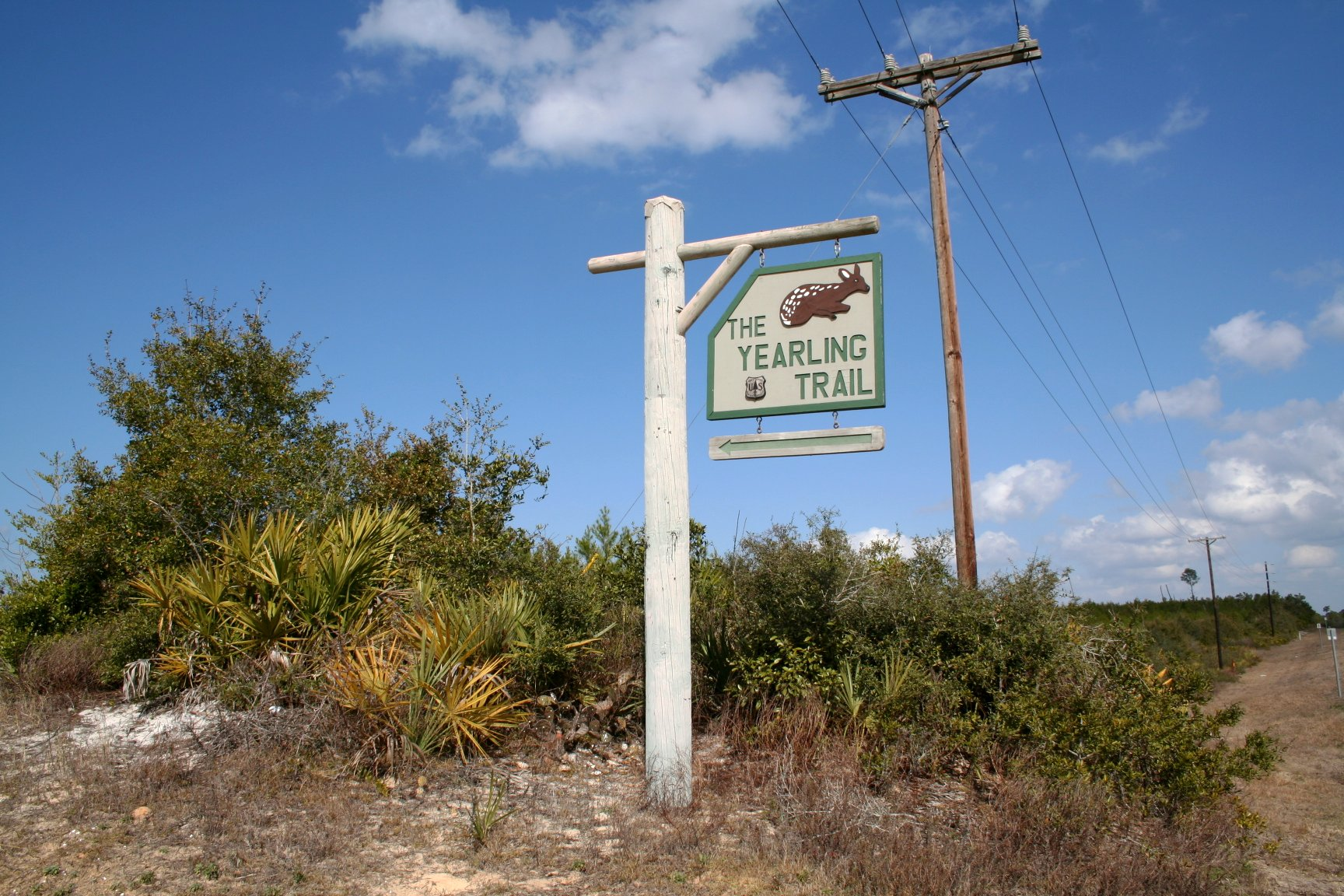
Yearling Trail sign within the forest.

Cyclists can travel along a 22-mile (35 km) long ride on the Paisley Woods Bicycle Trail. Mountain bikes are encouraged for the environment, due to the lack of paving on the trail.

=== Off-road vehicles ===
The Ocala National Forest has three trail systems for off-highway vehicles (OHV): the Ocala North OHV Trail System with six trail loops that are 125 miles (201 km) long, the Wandering Wiregrass OHV Trail in the southeast of the forest with a trail length of 17 miles (27 km), and the Ocala Centennial OHV Trail system which was added in 2008 to commemorate the 100th anniversary of the forest. A small trail 20 miles (32 km) long called the Scrubjay and a longer trail 42 miles (68 km) long called the Centennial may be accessed from trailheads off FR 573. SR 40, and the Big Scrub Campground. Some areas are restricted to off-road vehicles.

There are many trails for horseback riding in the forest. Forest riding trails are old roads 6 to 8 feet (1.8 to 2.4 m) wide, marked at intervals with painted spots – called blazes – on the trees. Some of the best trails include the One Hundred Mile trail and the LAM trail.

The Ocala National Forest is a wildlife management area, in which hunting and fishing activities are managed by the Florida Fish and Wildlife Conservation Commission. A permit is required for all hunters (except those indicated as exempt) to hunt in this area. A Quota Hunt Permit may also be required during certain periods or certain game.

A public shooting range is located at the center of the National Forest Forest Road 11, north of S.R. 40 in the Ocala National Forest.

== Lakes ==
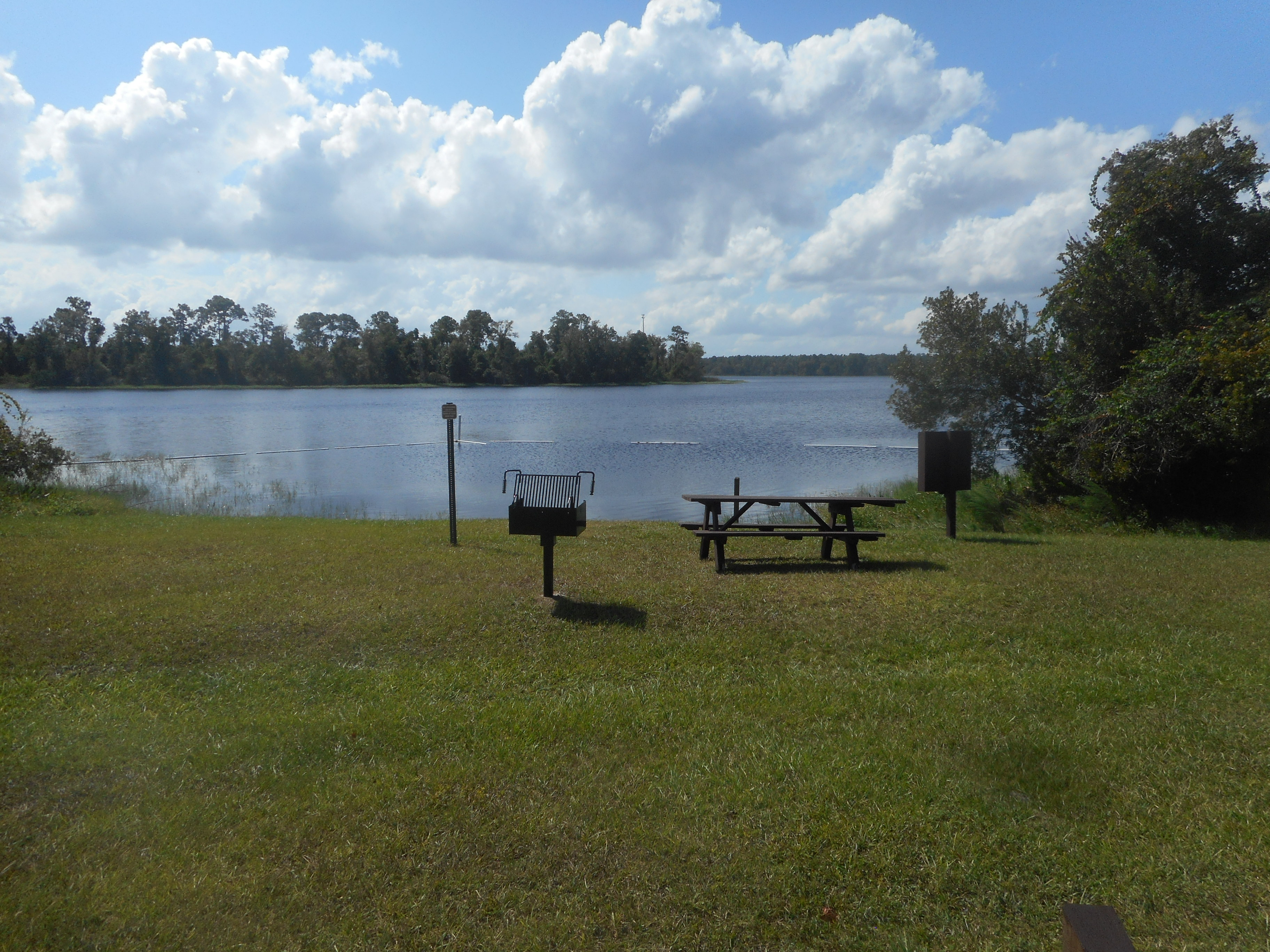
The north shore of Wildcat Lake along SR 40 in Lake County. A boat ramp exists east of the picnic area shown here.

The following is a list of lakes in or on the border of the forest:

- Blue Sink
- Lake Bryant
- Lake Delancy
- Lake Dexter
- Doe Lake
- Lake Dorr
- Lake George
- Halfmoon Lake
- Lake Kathryn

- Lake Kerr
- Lochloosa Lake
- Lake Mary
- Mill Dam Lake
- Lake Ocklawaha
- Orange Lake
- Lake Weir
- Wildcat Lake
- Lake Woodruff

== Campsites and Cabins ==
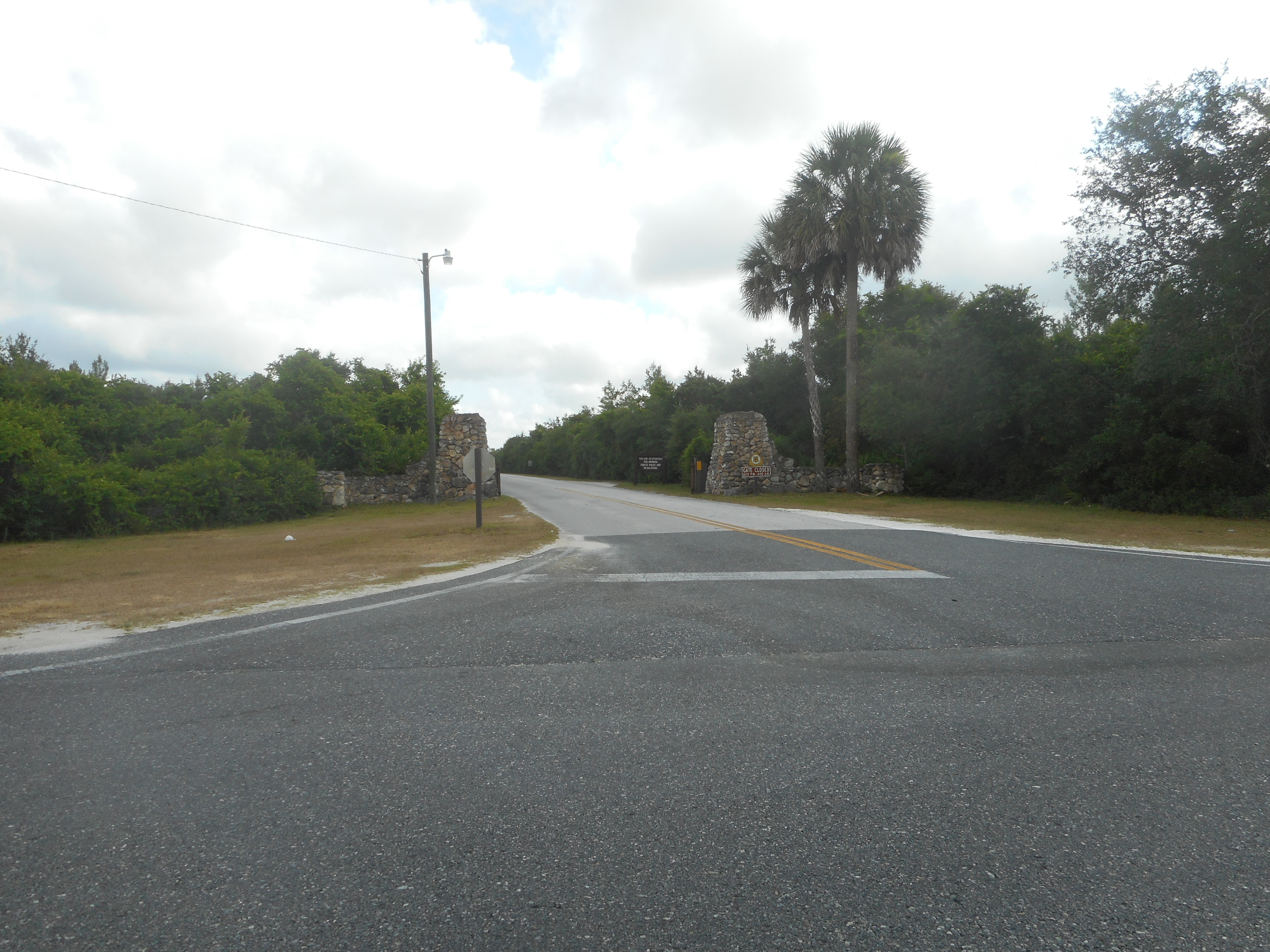
Juniper Springs Recreation Area off of SR 40

- Alexander Springs Recreation Area – about four miles (6.4 km) northeast of Buck Lake, close to CR 445, ten miles (16 km) southwest of Astor,
- Big Bass Lake – southernmost campsite in the forest, known as a halfway mark between Weirsdale and Altoona
- Big Scrub – two miles (3.2 km) northeast of Doe Lake campsite, the nearest town is Moss Bluff
- Buck Lake – three miles (4.8 km) north of Altoona, six miles (9.7 km) north of Umatilla; located about 100 feet (30 m) above sea level, where State Road 19 and Lake County road 445 meet.
- Clearwater Lake Recreation Area – easternmost major campsite, close to Lake Woodruff National Wildlife Refuge, named after nearby Clearwater Lake – the nearest town to this campsite is Paisley
- Doe Lake – western part of the forest, five miles (8.0 km) east of Lake Weir by the Ocklawaha River. A designated group campsite centered around a historic lodge with a large group kitchen for gatherings of up to 250 people.
- Fore Lake - Government campsite located 6.5 miles north of Hwy 40 on CR 314.
- Hopkins Prairie Campground - camping area with minimal facilities, open seasonally.
- Juniper Springs Recreation Area – lies near the junction of State Road 19 and State Road 40
- Lake Delancy East & West Campgrounds – northernmost major campsite, three miles (4.8 km) east of Rodman Reservoir, 10 miles (16 km) southeast of Orange Springs. Lake Delancy West is an OHV recreation area that houses OHV corrals, access to numerous marked OHV trails, and camping along the lake.
- Lake Dorr Cabin - Located on the south shore of Lake Dorr approximately 1.5 miles northeast of Altoona. The modern cabin sites on a two-acre site. The cabin sleeps 10 guests, with a queen bed in one bedroom, two sets of bunk beds in the other bedroom and two sleeper sofas in the living room. It also has a bathroom and a full kitchen.
- Lake Dorr Recreation Area - campsites for tents, campers and RVs.
- Lake Eaton Campground - As a seasonal access area, the Lake Eaton Campground has only 14 sites.
- Lake Shore Group Campground - Tent camping on the shores of Fore Lake.
- Salt Springs Recreation Area - The largest campground in Ocala National Forest. Located in the community of Salt Springs, which has a gas station, grocery store, restaurants, bait and tackle shops, a post office, and a laundromat.
- Sweetwater Cabin - A 1930's CCC cabin located near Sweetwater Spring, which creates a stream feeding Juniper Creek. The cabin has two rooms with 3 bunk beds in each, bathroom, and full kitchen. Due to high demand, Sweetwater Cabin rentals are awarded through an annual computerized lottery selection process.

== Wilderness areas ==
There are four officially designated wilderness areas lying within Ocala National Forest that are part of the National Wilderness Preservation System.

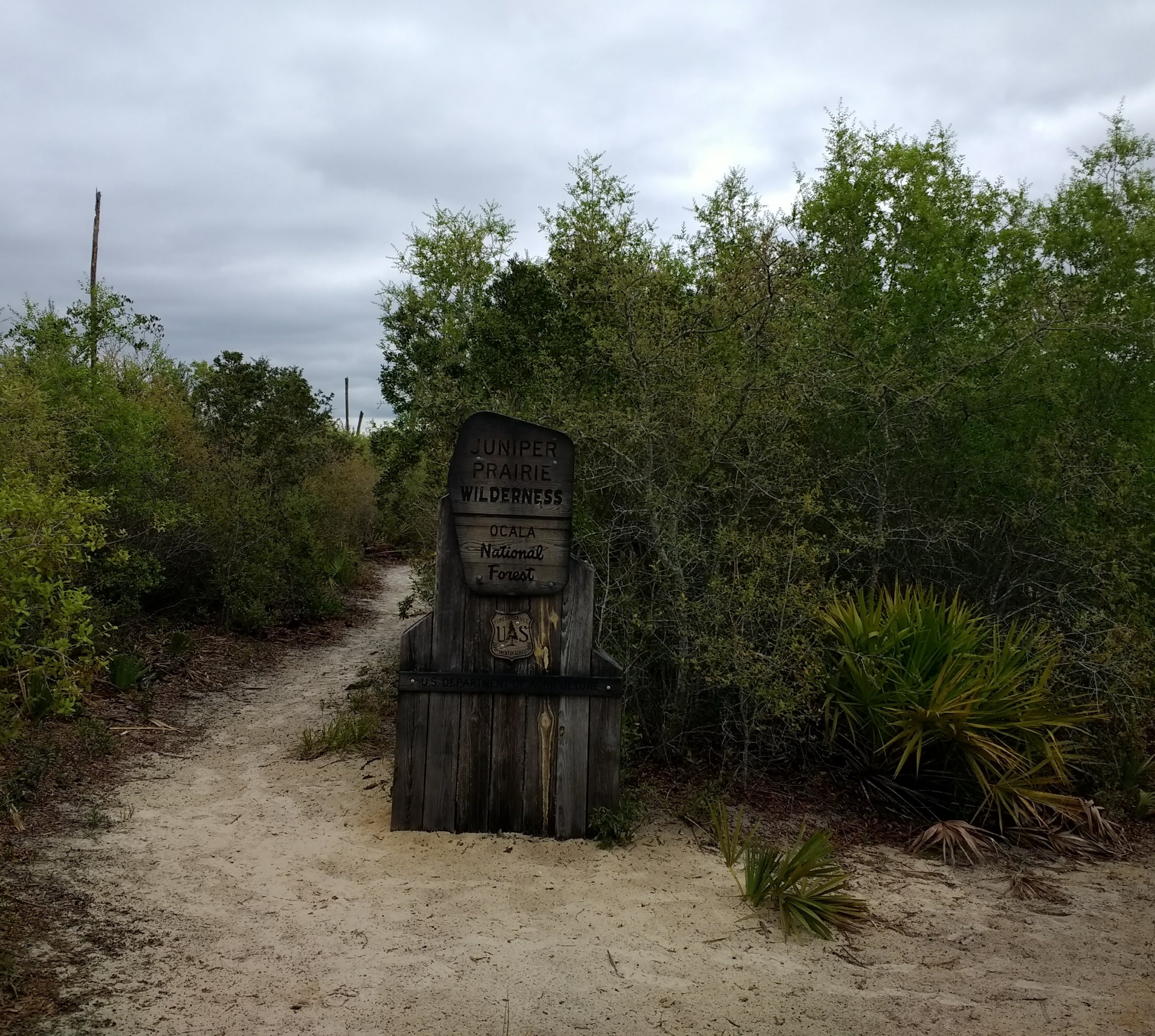
The entrance to the Florida Trail in the Juniper Prairie Wilderness.

- Alexander Springs Wilderness
- Billies Bay Wilderness
- Juniper Prairie Wilderness
- Little Lake George Wilderness

== See also ==
- List of national forests of the United States
- Apalachicola National Forest
- Osceola National Forest
- Silver Glen Springs Recreation Area
- The Origins of the National Forests (1992 book)

== Sources ==
- Mohlenbrock, Robert H. (December 1976). "Woody Plants of the Ocala National Forest, Florida". Castanea. 41 (4): 309–319. JSTOR 4032722.
- Myers, Roland L. (1990). "Scrub and High Pine". In Myers, Ronald L.; Ewel, John J. (eds.). Ecosystems of Florida. Orlando, Florida: University of Central Florida Press. pp. 150–193. ISBN 0-8130-1022-5.
- Turcotte, Florence M. (Spring 2012). "For this is an Enchanted Land: Marjorie Kinnan Rawlings and the Florida Environment". The Florida Historical Quarterly. 90 (4): 488–504. JSTOR 23264717.
- Webber, H. J. (March 1935). "The Florida Scrub, a Fire-Fighting Association". American Journal of Botany. 22 (3): 344–361. doi:10.2307/2436361. JSTOR 2436361.
