= Silver Glen Springs =

Spring in Florida, United States

Silver Glen Springs Recreation Area
- IUCN category V (protected landscape/seascape)
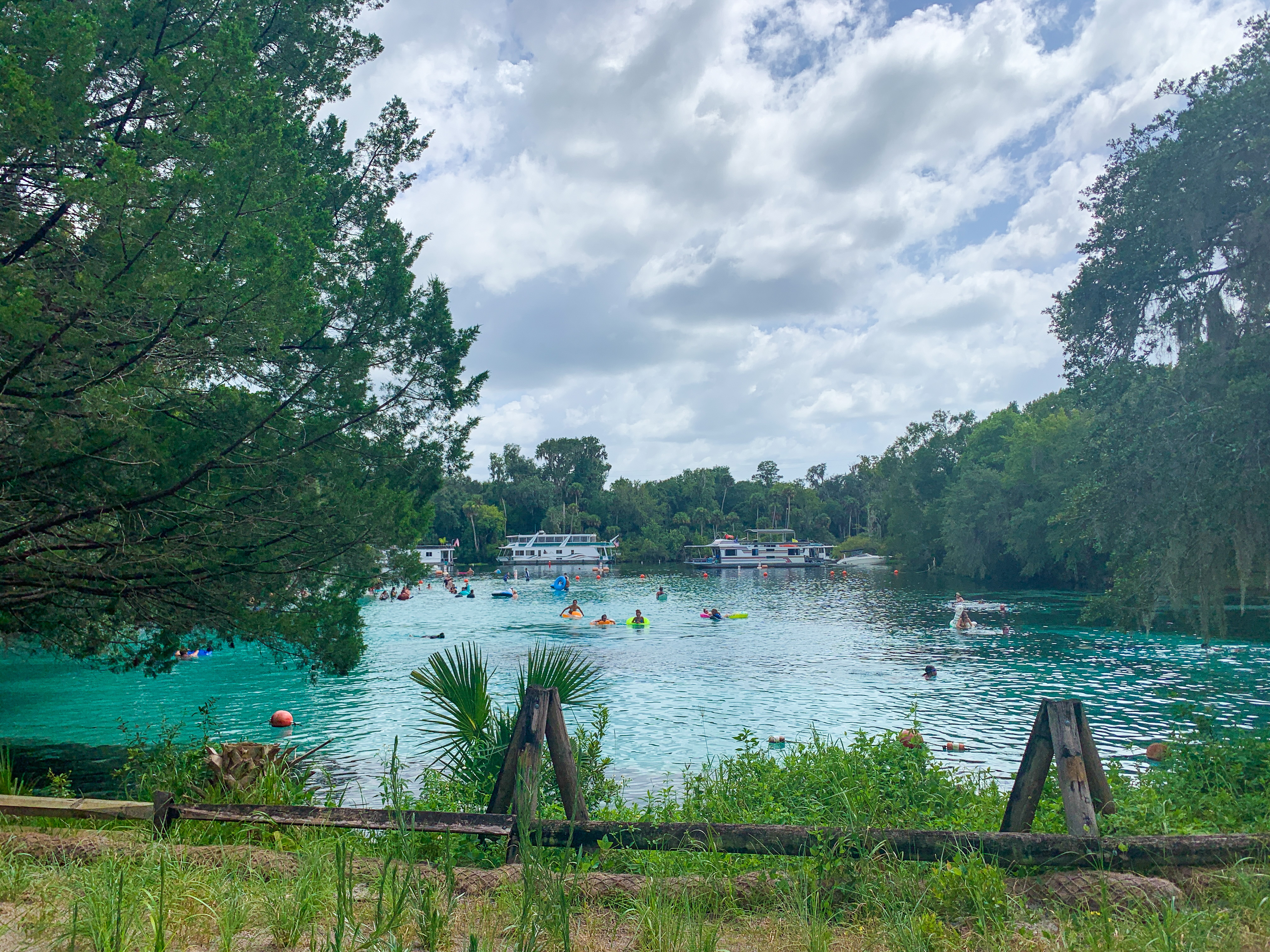
- Silver Glen Springs, August 2020

- Location within Florida Location within the United States
- Location: Marion, Florida, United States
- Coordinates: 29.2468°N 81.6435°W
- Area: 22 acres (8.9 ha)
- Governing body: Ocala National Forest – Lake George Ranger District

Silver Glen Springs is a first-magnitude spring and the main attraction of the Silver Glen Springs Recreation Area of Ocala National Forest. It lies at the east edge of the national forest. It is about 2 miles north of the entrance of Juniper Creek, and it is along the edge of the Big Scrub. There is a short spring run that is about 0.75 miles long and goes to Lake George.

The site is managed by Ocala National Forest – Lake George Ranger District and run by a private concessioner. It is a popular day use area as well as an archaeological site.

== History ==
Native Americans inhabited the St. Johns River around 5000 years ago, evidenced by radiocarbon dating of shell mounds along the river. Artifacts such as Stone Age tools, pottery, and other relics have been uncovered at Silver Glen Springs.

Silver Glen was previously a large private campground. Later, it gradually transformed into a wilderness setting.

== Description ==
Sixty-five million gallons of water a day come out from two spring vents. At the southwest corner of the spring pool is a small spring vent called “Natural Well” which contains fish and the occasional manatee. It is not accessible by water to protect the natural habitat, but can be seen from land. Natural Well is 12–15 feet in diameter and 40 feet in depth. The spring vent at the eastern part of the pool is 18 feet deep. The spring pool is large and semicircular, measuring 200 feet north to south and 175 feet east to west. The pool bottom is composed of sand and limestone with some aquatic grass. The water is clear and cool at 72 degrees Fahrenheit.

Sometimes large schools of striped bass travel from the lake to the headspring. Also, tilapia can be seen going to the spring and building nests. Mullet can be seen as well. There is an immense cave system under the picnic area adjacent to the spring.

The park has the Spring Boils Trail that goes through the woods and leads to a boardwalk that goes to several sand boils, where water bubbles up through the sand. There is an old Native American mound east of the springhead, where Native American groups sometimes have ceremonies.

The area around the springs are relatively isolated with some private hunt camps. The Juniper Club is at the eastern entrance to the springs. This all-male club owns three thousand acres of land in the area.

== Activities ==
Silver Glen Springs is a very popular site with large crowds of visitors, especially on the weekends. There is a fee to access the site.

Snorkelers can see saltwater and freshwater fish in the same headspring pool. No lifeguards are on duty. Scuba diving and fishing in some areas are prohibited. Canoe rentals are available.

There is a picnic area with tables, charcoal grills, and a volleyball net. A small general store provides some goods such as ice and volleyball rentals for the nearby volleyball area. Restrooms are on site.

The park does not permit overnight camping, only day use.

== In popular culture ==
In 1941, the movie company Metro-Goldwyn-Mayer arranged with the Juniper Club to film some scenes of The Yearling at their property. During the filming, a barge sank in Silver Glen and it can still be seen today.
