= Hammock (ecology) =

Type of ecosystem in the southeastern United States

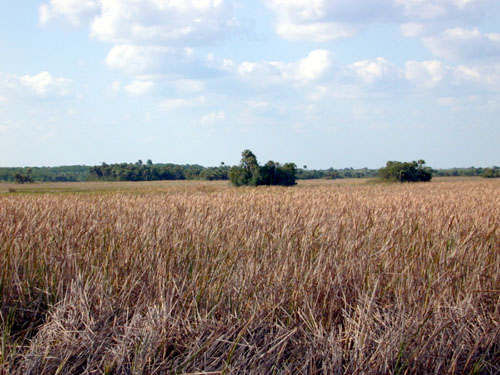
Hammocks growing on a Florida marshland.

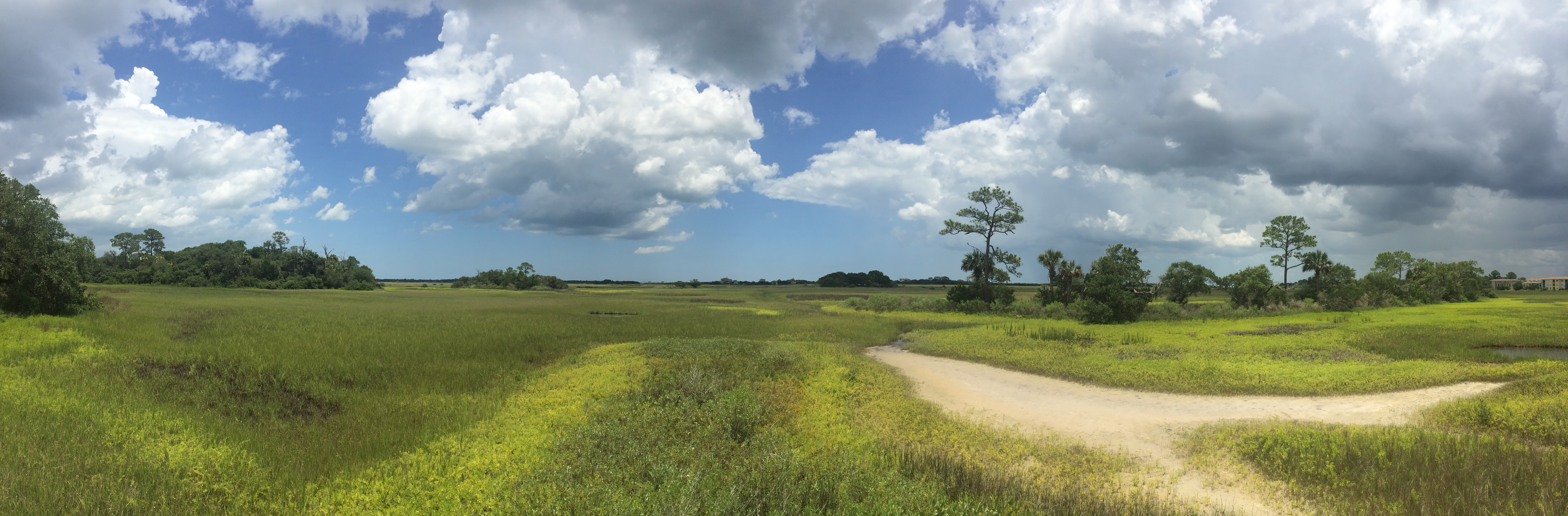
Fort Mose was built on a hammock near St. Augustine, Florida.

Hammock is a term used in the southeastern United States for stands of trees, usually hardwood, that form an ecological island in a contrasting ecosystem. Hammocks grow on elevated areas, often just a few inches high, surrounded by wetlands that are too wet to support them. The term hammock is also applied to stands of hardwood trees growing on slopes between wetlands and drier uplands supporting a mixed or coniferous forest. Types of hammocks found in the United States include tropical hardwood hammocks, temperate hardwood hammocks, and maritime or coastal hammocks. Hammocks are also often classified as hydric (wet soil), mesic (moist soil), or xeric (dry soil). The types are not exclusive, but often grade into each other.

Unlike many ecosystems of the coastal plain of the southeastern United States, hammocks are not tolerant of fire. Hammocks tend to occur in locations where fire is not common, or where there is some protection from fire in neighboring ecosystems. Hammocks began developing in historic times in areas where fire was suppressed through human intervention, or where elevations above wetlands were created by dredging, mining, road and causeway building, and other human activities. On the other hand, many hammocks have been destroyed by development, as they often occur on higher land in desirable locations, such as barrier islands and other waterfront locations.

The etymology of the term "hammock" is obscure. Dictionaries usually give it as an archaic form of "hummock" ("hammock" appeared in print earlier than "hummock"). "Hammock" is first attested in English in the 1550s as a nautical term for a tree-covered island (a mound of trees) seen on the horizon. "Hammock" is used to refer to stands of hardwood trees on the coastal plain from North Carolina to Mississippi. Types of hammock described in the literature include:

== Tropical hardwood hammocks ==
In the United States, tropical hardwood hammocks are found in southern Florida. Sub-types of hammocks in southern Florida include rockland hammocks on the Miami Rock Ridge and in the Big Cypress National Preserve, Keys rockland hammocks in the Florida Keys, coastal berm hammocks in the Florida Keys and along the north shore of Florida Bay, tree island hammocks in the Everglades, shell mound hammocks, coastal rock barren hammocks in the Florida Keys, and sinkhole hammocks on the Miami Rock Ridge.

The trees forming the canopy of the southernmost tropical hardwood hammocks in Florida are almost all West Indian species. The southern live oak (Quercus virginiana) is the only temperate hardwood species to appear regularly in such hammocks. Hammocks along the east coast of Florida as far north as Cape Canaveral, and along the west coast of Florida as far north as the mouth of the Manatee River on Tampa Bay, include West Indian species as canopy trees, but with increasing numbers of temperate species with increasing latitude, so that tropical hardwood hammocks grade into temperate hardwood hammocks.

The tree island hammocks in the Everglades appear as teardrop-shaped islands shaped by the flow of water in the middle of a slough. Many tropical species such as mahogany (Swietenia mahagoni), gumbo limbo (Bursera simaruba), and cocoplum (Chrysobalanus icaco) grow alongside the more familiar temperate species of southern live oak, red maple (Acer rubrum), and hackberry (Celtis laevigata).

== Maritime hammocks ==
Maritime hammocks, also known as maritime forests or coastal hammocks, are found on stable sand dunes away from the beach on barrier islands, and on small islands in salt marshes. They are found all along the Atlantic Coast and Gulf Coast of the United States. Some authorities classify coastal hammocks as hydric hammocks.

== Temperate hardwood hammocks ==
Temperate hardwood hammocks are narrow bands of broadleaf forest that occur on the coastal plain of the southeastern United States. In most of the southeast, including the Florida panhandle, the trees in temperate hardwood hammocks are primarily evergreen. Hardwood hammocks in northern Florida peninsula have a mixture of deciduous and evergreen trees, and hardwood hammocks in southern Florida north of the Everglades have a mixture of evergreen and tropical trees.

=== Hydric hammocks ===
Hydric hammocks, also known as low hammocks, wetland hardwood hammocks, or lowland oak hammocks, grow on soils that are poorly drained or that have high water tables, subject to occasional flooding. They are usually found on gentle slopes just above swamps, marshes or wet prairies. Hydric hammocks are found in scattered locations in Florida north of Lake Okeechobee, with concentrations along the upper St. Johns River, the Atlantic coast of northeastern Florida, and particularly along the Big Bend section of the Gulf Coast of Florida, from Aripeka to St. Marks.

=== Mesic hammocks ===
Mesic hammocks are hammocks of the southeastern United States coasts (from North Carolina to Texas) and all of peninsular Florida which grow on soils that are rarely flooded. The canopy of mesic hammocks consists primarily of evergreen hardwoods and cabbage palms. The southern live oak is the most common tree in mesic hammocks. Other trees commonly found in mesic hammocks include southern magnolia, pignut hickory, water oak, and laurel oak. Some of those trees are less frequent or absent in southern Florida (from about Lake Okeechobee south), where tropical species, such as gumbo limbo and satinleaf, may be found. Slash pines and loblolly pines are found in many mesic hammocks. The soil in mesic hammocks is well-drained and rarely flooded, but remains moist due to the shade of the canopy, and the heavy leaf litter that usually occurs in them.

=== Xeric hammocks ===
Xeric hammocks, also known as xeric forests or sand hammocks, grow on well-drained sandy soil, such as old sand dunes, where there is some protection from fire. Xeric hammocks are characterized by sand live oak (Quercus geminata) and saw palmetto (Serenoa repens). Xeric hammocks may develop from scrub or sandhill communities. Scrub-derived hammocks typically include myrtle oak (Quercus myrtifolia) and Chapman's oak (Quercus chapmanii), while sandhill-derived hammocks include turkey oak (Quercus laevis) and bluejack oak (Quercus incana). Xeric hammocks require long-term protection from fire to develop, but once established, are somewhat resistant to fire. Sand live oak and myrtle oak reproduce by cloning, and if allowed to become established, may regrow from the roots if the hammock does burn.

=== Prairie hammocks ===
Prairie hammocks are a sub-type of hydric and mesic hammocks composed principally of live oak and cabbage palm trees. They occur in central and southern Florida in prairies and floodplains, on river levees, and on slopes between dry uplands and wetlands.

=== Oak domes ===
Oak domes, also called oak hammocks, grow as small patches on shallow depressions or slight hills. They consist of thick stands of evergreen oaks, and are distinct from their surrounding habitats, which are typically woodlands dominated by longleaf pine.
