= Juniper Prairie Wilderness =

Part of a national forest located Florida

- IUCN category Ib (wilderness area)
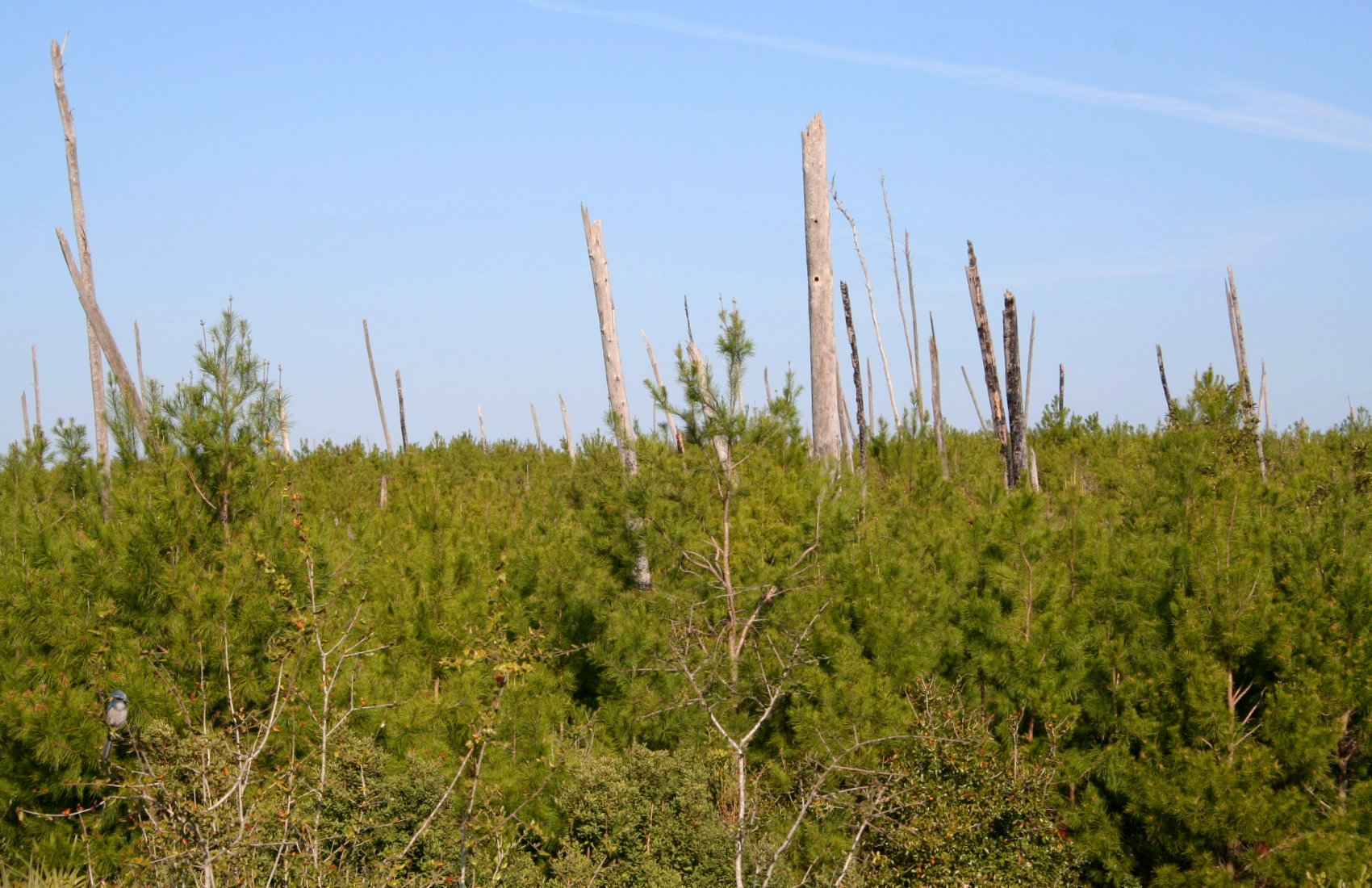
- Post-fire regrowth in the Juniper Prairie Wilderness
- Interactive map of Juniper Prairie Wilderness
- Location: Marion County, Florida, United States
- Nearest city: Ocala, FL
- Coordinates: 29.216944°N 81.687778°W
- Area: 13,260 acres (5,370 ha)
- Established: 1984
- Governing body: U.S. Forest Service

The Juniper Prairie Wilderness is a protected wilderness area in the Ocala National Forest in Florida, United States.

== Area description ==
The Juniper Prairie Wilderness was established in 1984 and covers an area of about 54 square kilometers (13,260 acres). It protects a diverse set of habitats including prairie, Longleaf and Sand Pine scrub, marshes, subtropical palm jungles, swamp hardwoods, as well as sawgrass. It also forms the drainage basin for the Juniper River. The headwaters of the Juniper River, Juniper Springs, is a first magnitude artesian aquifer, and is bounded within a national forest.

== Settlement history ==
In the 1840s, Patrick Smith settled in the Juniper Prairie Wilderness in an area which became known as "Pats Island". Reuben Long and his family homesteaded in the area in 1872. Around the turn of the 20th century, human population on Pats Island peaked with about a dozen families. The inhabitants supported themselves through farming, hunting, fishing, and trade along the St. Johns River. Because of the poor economic conditions, most inhabitants had left the area before it became part of the Ocala National Forest in 1908. In 1935, the last inhabitants abandoned the area after a settlement history of less than 100 years.

== Literary impact ==
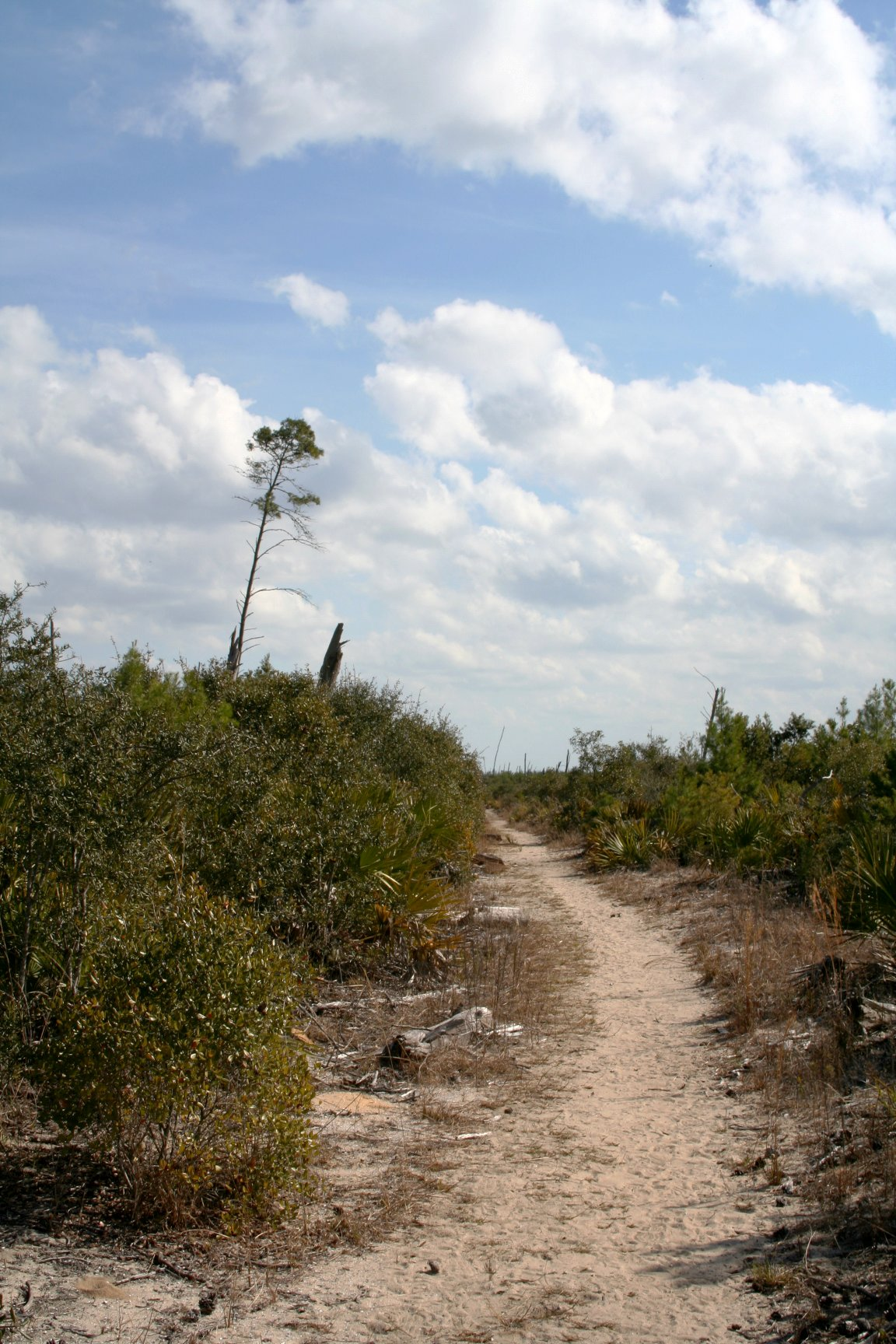
Yearling Trail in the Juniper Prairie Wilderness.

The author Marjorie Kinnan Rawlings visited the last two remaining inhabitants, Calvin and Mary Long in October 1933. She recorded the stories she was told on that occasion and other visits, which she worked into her novel The Yearling which was published in 1938 and won a Pulitzer Prize in 1939. A movie of the same name was made based on the novel in 1946.

== References and external links ==
- wilderness description
- settlement history
- Juniper Springs
- Juniper Prairie Wilderness - official site at Ocala National Forest
