= Clearwater Lake Campground =

Clearwater Lake campground may refer to campgrounds at:

- Wells Gray Provincial Park (section Campgrounds)
- Clearwater Lake (British Columbia)
- Clearwater Lake Recreation Area, Florida
