= Salt Springs, Florida =

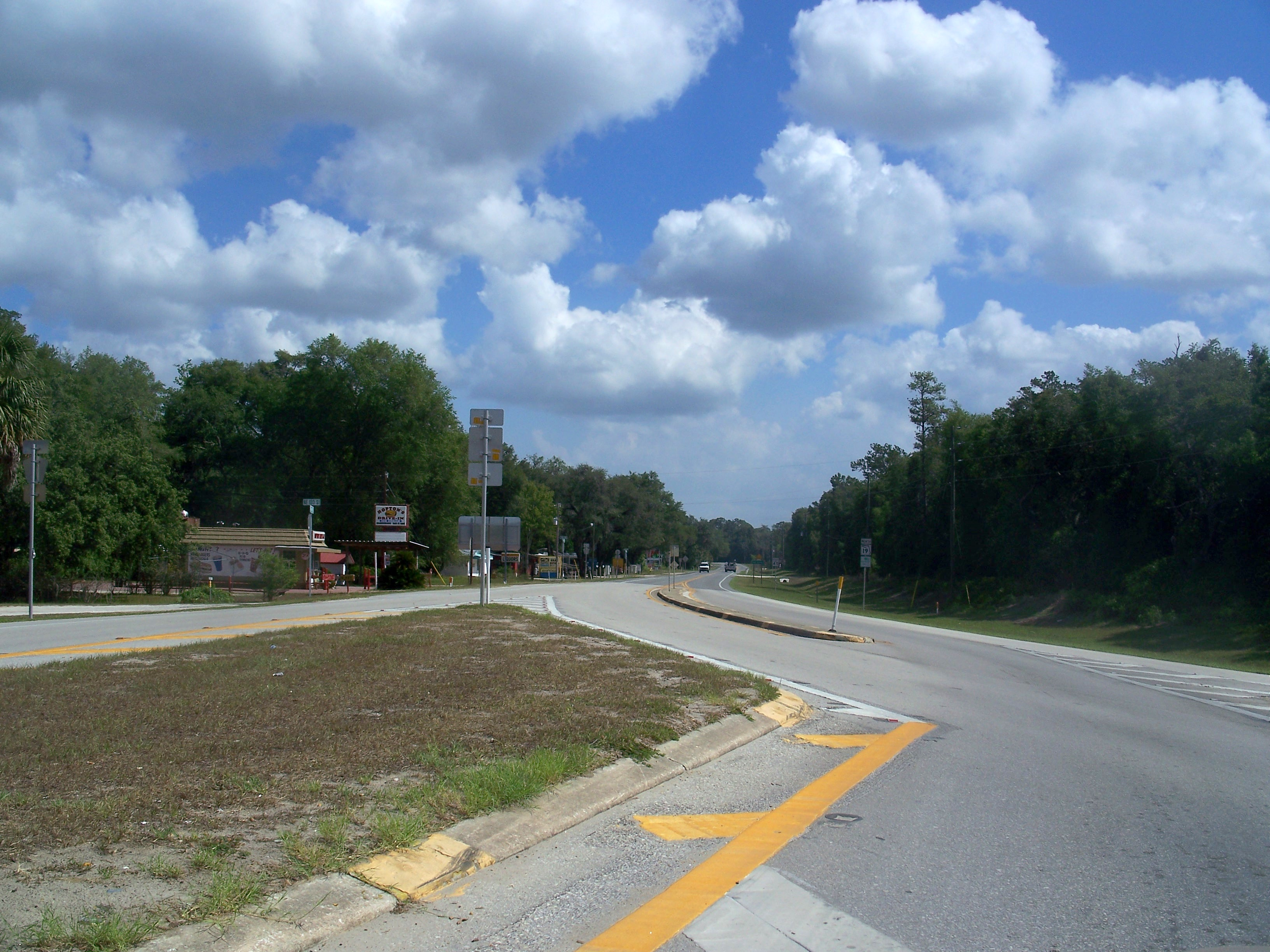
- Looking north along SR 19 from the CR 314 intersection

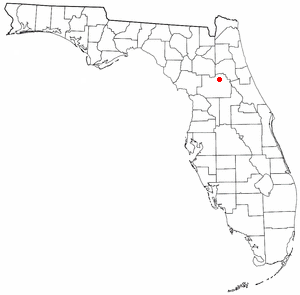
- Coordinates: 29°21′04″N 81°44′06″W
- Country: United States
- State: Florida
- County: Marion

Salt Springs is an unincorporated community in Marion County, Florida, United States. It is located near Lake George. The community is part of the Ocala Metropolitan Statistical Area. Salt Springs is located within the Ocala National Forest.

Salt Springs offers plenty of activities for the family including fishing, camping, biking and hiking. The neighboring body of water known as Lake Kerr is also a place to enjoy a variety of water sports. The main attraction is the Salt Springs Recreation and Camping areas. The recreation area is home to the Salt Springs, with clear water that is 72 °F year round. The springs are full of bass, turtles, and blue crabs. Although alligators inhabit the area, the swimming hole is safe and free from these predators during the day. The springs boast 4 inch boils which you can swim into, the deepest being 6 fathoms (36 ft deep). This spring feeds into Lake George.

The main roads through Salt Springs are State Road 19, as well as County Road 314 and County Road 316.
