= Little Lake George Wilderness =

Part of a national forest located Florida

- IUCN category Ib (wilderness area)
- Location within Florida Location within the United States
- Location: Putnam County, Florida, USA
- Nearest city: Palatka, Florida
- Coordinates: 29°27′32″N 81°42′17″W
- Area: 2,833 acres (11 km^{2})
- Established: September 28, 1984
- Governing body: U.S. Forest Service

The Little Lake George Wilderness is part of Ocala National Forest. The 2,833-acre (11 km^{2}) refuge was established on September 28, 1984. The Wilderness is at the confluence of the St. Johns and Oklawaha Rivers.

== Flora ==
Plants in the area include red maple, ash, cypress, cabbage palm, loblolly, slash and pond pine.

== Fauna ==
Sunfish, bass and crappie can be found in the waters here.
