= Arthur Arling =

American cinematographer (1906–1991)

Arthur E. Arling
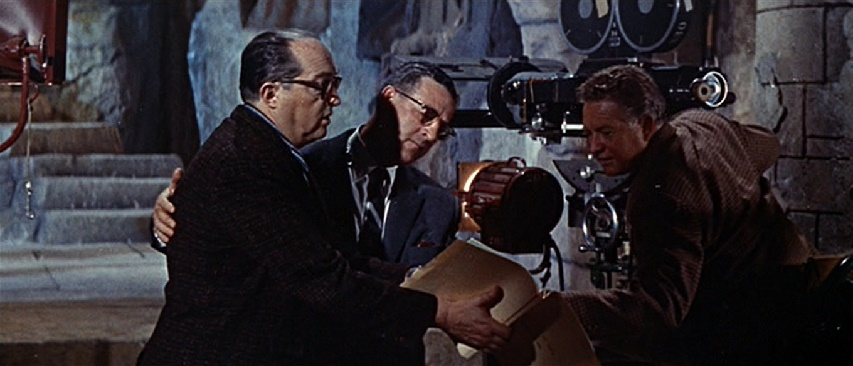
- Arling (right) with director Henry Koster (left) and producer Samuel G. Engel (middle) on the set of The Story of Ruth (1960)
- Born: September 19, 1906; Missouri, U.S.
- Died: October 16, 1991 (aged 85); Riverside County, California, U.S.
- Occupation: Cinematographer

Arthur E. Arling, A.S.C. (September 19, 1906 – October 16, 1991) was a Hollywood cinematographer and cameraman. His early work included Gone with the Wind (1939) and The Yearling (1946), for which he won a joint Oscar shared with Charles Rosher and Leonard Smith. He was nominated for an Oscar for the Lillian Roth biopic I'll Cry Tomorrow (1955). Arling, who served as a Lieutenant Commander in the U.S. Navy during World War II, is buried at Riverside National Cemetery in Riverside, California.

== Partial filmography ==
- The Yearling (1946)
- The Homestretch (1947)
- Captain from Castile (1947)
- Mother Is a Freshman (1949)
- You're My Everything (1949)
- My Blue Heaven (1950)
- Wabash Avenue (1950)
- Call Me Mister (1951)
- Belles on Their Toes (1952)
- Red Garters (1954)
- Love Me or Leave Me (1955)
- I'll Cry Tomorrow (1955)
- Three for the Show (1955)
- The Glass Slipper (1955)
- Ransom! (1955)
- The Great American Pastime (1956)
- Man in the Shadow (1957)
- Tammy and the Bachelor (1957)
- Flood Tide (1957)
- Pay the Devil (1958)
- This Happy Feeling (1958)
- Once Upon a Horse (1958)
- Kathy O' (1958)
- The Story of Ruth (1959)
- Pillow Talk (1959)
- Take a Giant Step (1959)
- Lover Come Back (1961)
- Swingin' Along (1961)
- Boys' Night Out (1962)
- The Notorious Landlady (1962)
- My Six Loves (1963)
- Strait-Jacket (1964)
- The Secret Invasion (1964)
- Once Before I Die (1965)
- Ski Party (1965)
