= The Yearling (1946 film) =

1946 film by Clarence Brown

- Theatrical release poster designed by Douglass Crockwell (November 1946)
- Directed by: Clarence Brown
- Screenplay by: Paul Osborn
- Based on: The Yearling by Marjorie Kinnan Rawlings
- Produced by: Sidney Franklin
- Starring: Gregory Peck; Jane Wyman; Claude Jarman Jr.
- Cinematography: Arthur Arling; Charles Rosher; Leonard Smith
- Edited by: Harold F. Kress
- Music by: Herbert Stothart arrangement of Frederick Delius's music
- Color process: Technicolor
- Production company: Metro-Goldwyn-Mayer
- Distributed by: Loew's, Inc.
- Release date: December 18, 1946
- Running time: 128 minutes
- Country: United States
- Language: English
- Budget: $3,883,000
- Box office: $7,599,000

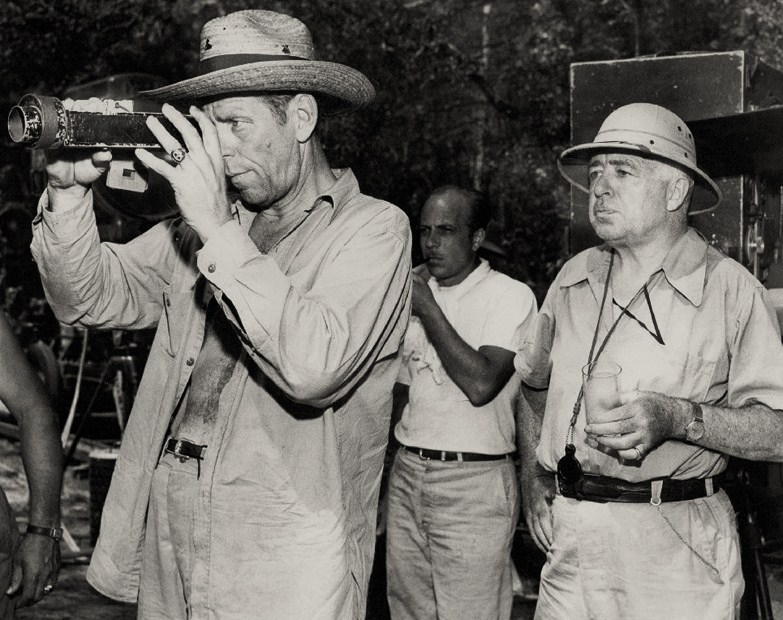
On set, L-R: Leonard Smith, unknown & Clarence Brown

The Yearling is a 1946 American family film directed by Clarence Brown, produced by Sidney Franklin, and released by Metro-Goldwyn-Mayer (MGM). The screenplay by Paul Osborn and John Lee Mahin (uncredited) was adapted from Marjorie Kinnan Rawlings's 1938 novel of the same name. The film stars: Gregory Peck, Jane Wyman, Claude Jarman Jr. in his film debut, Chill Wills and Forrest Tucker.

The story follows a boy named Jody, who adopts a trouble-making young deer. The story was later adapted as the 1994 TV film The Yearling starring Peter Strauss and Jean Smart.

The movie becoming the ninth-highest-grossing film of 1946 in United States.

== Plot ==
Ezra "Penny" Baxter, once a Confederate soldier, and his wife Ora, are pioneer farmers near Lake George, Florida in 1878. Their son, Jody, a boy in his pre-teen years, is their only surviving child. Jody has a wonderful relationship with his warm and loving father. Ora, however, is still haunted by the deaths of the other children of the family she lost over the years, fearing that Jody will end up dying if she shows any love to the boy, leading Jody to find her unloving and unreasonable.

One morning, Jody and his parents discover that a bear has appeared and killed a calf and young pig from among their stock. They set out after the bear, accompanied by Penny's dogs Perk, Rip and Julia. They catch up with the bear, but it is able to escape after Perk flees, Penny's gun misfires, and Julia is badly injured.

Upset over Julia's injury and the broken gun, Penny decides to get a new shotgun in exchange for Perk.

One day, as Penny and Jody are tracking down their missing hogs that had been stolen by the Forresters, a rattlesnake bites Penny before he kills it. Penny kills a doe and uses her liver to draw out the venom. Jody asks to adopt the doe's orphaned fawn. Penny permits it but warns Jody that the fawn will have to be set free when it grows up.

When Jody goes to ask his friend Fodderwing, the youngest Forrester son, to name the fawn he discovers that Fodderwing has died. However, Buck Forrester tells Jody that Fodderwing had said that if he had a fawn he would name him Flag. Jody and his family attend Fodderwing's funeral, and at a generous request from the Forresters, Penny offers a eulogy about Fodderwing's kindness and wisdom with animals.

As months pass, Jody and Flag become inseparable. One year later, Flag has grown up and become a nuisance to the household and farm; causing damage to the farm and crops. After Penny is injured while trying to clear another field to make up for lost crops, Penny tells Jody that he and his mother have agreed that for Jody to keep Flag, he must replant lost corn, and build a taller fence around the cornfield.

Jody works hard and even receives help from Ora with the fence, but during the night, Flag manages to jump the new fence and destroy the new corn. Penny orders Jody to take the deer out into the woods and shoot it. Jody takes Flag out but does not have the heart to kill it. He orders the deer to go away and never return, but Flag comes back to their property, and again devours the corn crop. Ora shoots Flag with a double-barreled shotgun, discharging one of the barrels, but only wounding the deer. Penny orders Jody to put the deer out of its "torment". Rather than let his pet deer suffer an agonizing death, he follows his father's orders and kills Flag with the remaining shell.

The loss of Jody's beloved pet deer proves too much for him to handle. Overwhelmed with anger and despair, Jody runs away from home. Three days later, he is unconscious and adrift on the river in a canoe when he is rescued by a friendly boat captain, who returns him home. Jody and Penny quickly reconcile, but Ora is still out searching for him.

Just before Jody goes to bed, Ora returns and sees that he is back. She becomes filled with joy, knowing that her fear of losing her last child is now over. She happily runs into Jody's room and showers him with more affection than she ever has before. She is no longer afraid to show her maternal love to him. In the final scene, Jody falls asleep and dreams of romping with Flag.

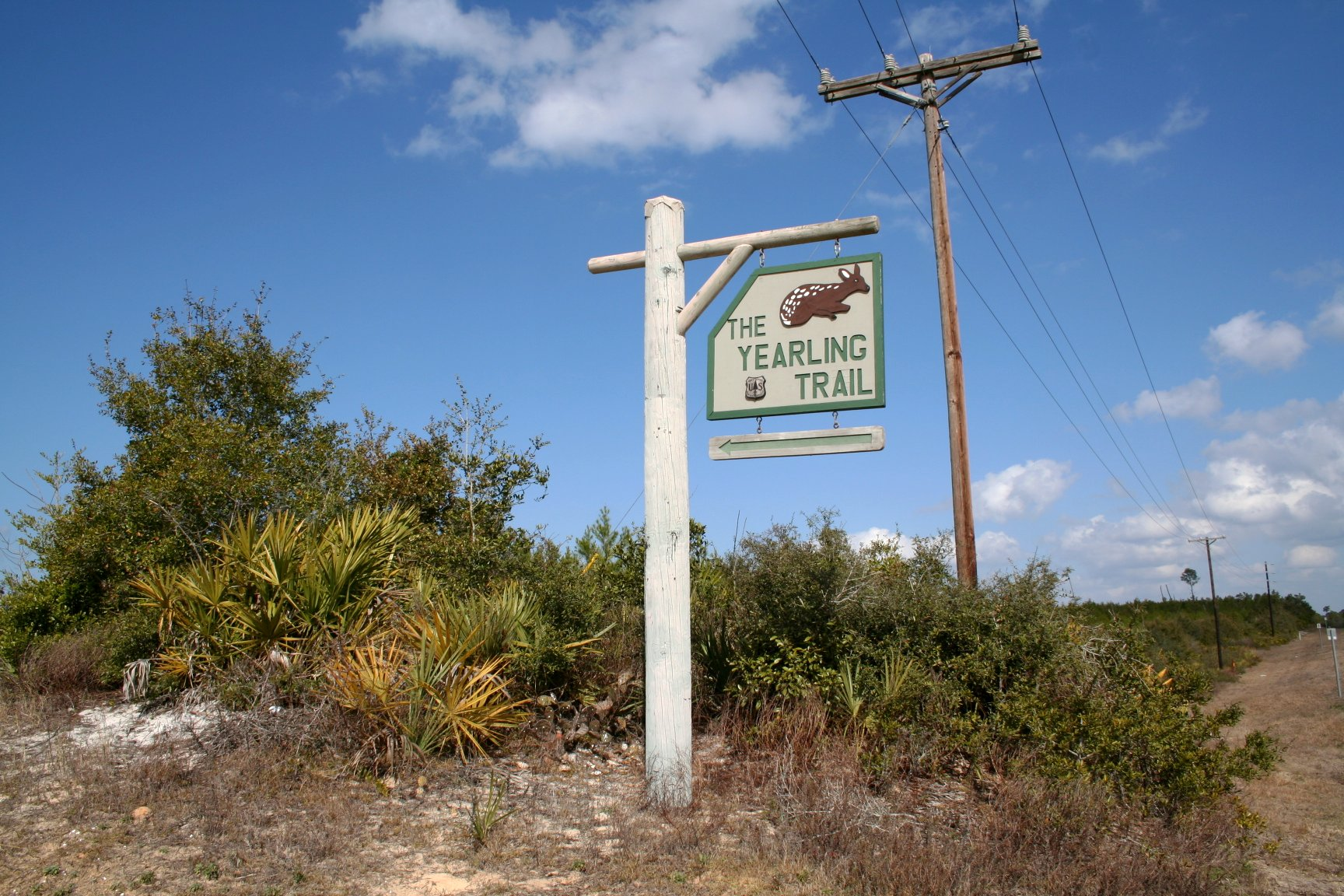
Trailhead of The Yearling Trail

== Cast ==
- Gregory Peck as Ezra "Penny" Baxter
- Jane Wyman as Ora Baxter
- Claude Jarman Jr. as Jody
- Chill Wills as Buck Forrester
- Clem Bevans as Pa Forrester
- Margaret Wycherly as Ma Forrester
- Henry Travers as Mr. Boyles
- Forrest Tucker as Lem Forrester
- Donn Gift as Fodderwing Forrester
- Jeff York as Oliver Hutto (uncredited)
- June Lockhart as Twink, Oliver's bride (uncredited)
- Arthur Hohl as Arch Forrester (uncredited)
- George Mann as Pack Forrester (uncredited)
- Dan White as Millwheel Forrester (uncredited)
- Matt Willis as Gabby Forrester (uncredited)
- Houseley Stevenson as Mr. Ranger (uncredited)
- Joan Wells as Eulalie Boyles (uncredited)
- Chick York as Doc Wilson (uncredited)

== Production ==
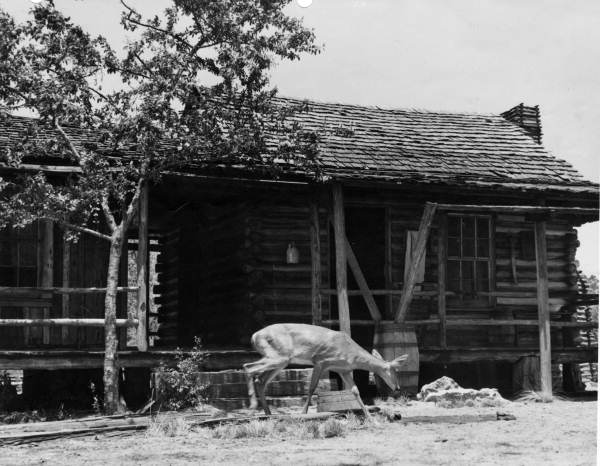
Image from the pre-production and location scouting of MGM

The Yearling was filmed on location in the Juniper Prairie Wilderness in the Ocala National Forest in Florida. A hiking trail in the area, "The Yearling Trail", is named after the story, and gives access to sites where the family lived whose stories inspired the novel.

MGM originally began production on The Yearling in 1941, with Spencer Tracy set to star as the patriarch, and with Victor Fleming chosen to direct. The studio also hired Marjorie Kinnan Rawlings, the author of the novel The Yearling, as a consultant and location scout. Rawlings marked a forest service map with locations for filming, specifically referencing the clearing she named "Baxter's Island". MGM moved to the filming location, renovated the cabin, and built surrounding buildings to create a town for a set. Once the actors arrived on location, a combination of the bugs, heat, and lack of enthusiasm for the plot made the actors leave. This led to the film being shelved after only three weeks of location shooting in Florida. (Note: According to biographer Millicent Bell, famed novelist John P. Marquand was visiting MGM in 1941 and asked to sit in on a "Yearling" production meeting. He was amused to find that he was the only person in the meeting who had read the book.)

Production was resumed in 1945, after Clarence Brown was hired as the new director. Brown cast Gregory Peck to play Pa, Jane Wyman to play Ma, and after a long search, cast Claude Jarman Jr. to play Jody. Due to Brown's drive for perfection, the average take number for scenes was between 20–21. He also got real hunting dogs to film the bear fight scene after deciding the original city dogs were not good enough. Peck received the second of his five Oscar nominations for The Yearling, his fifth film.

== Music ==
Herbert Stothart made arrangements of Frederick Delius's music, particularly Appalachia: Variations on an Old Slave Song, for the film. In 2006 Film Score Monthly released the majority of the film's original score alongside Stothart's score for Random Harvest (1942) in the CD collection Random Harvest/The Yearling (1942/1946) limited to 3,000 copies. Liner notes for both scores were provided by Marilee Bradford.

Track listing for The Yearling

1. Opening Title/Foreword/April 1878 – 6:31
2. Addenda to Feelin' the Sun – 0:39
3. Crippled Boy – 1:07
4. Birds and Angels – 1:35
5. A Farmer Comes to Town – 1:32
6. What Happened to You – 1:15
7. Material for a New Dress – 0:34
8. Obliged to Make It – 2:26
9. It's Me! Jody! – 3:15
10. To Find a Name – 4:33
11. Thy Will Be Done – 1:13
12. The Sun – 1:00
13. Little Farmer – 2:08
14. Ma, I'm Hungry – 2:28
15. Mother & End Title (alternate version)/Addendum – 2:47

Bonus tracks

1. Title Fanfare/Opening Title (instrumental)/Foreword (long version) – 2:19
2. Fawn Ballet Chorus Addenda – 1:43
3. Thy Will Be Done (alternate mix) – 1:15
4. Hungry (insert – revised vocal) – 0:44
5. Mother & End Title (alternate fragments) – 0:49

Total Time: 40:43

== Reception ==
Jac. D. Grant of the Hollywood Reporter wrote, it provides "an emotional experience seldom equaled." It's been described as "a huge success" and "a remarkable film that truly is for the entire family" by TV Guide; Variety said it is a "heart-warming story", that its "underlying power is impressive," and that "the underplaying is sometimes too static, but just as interest lags, the director injects another highlight."

The film earned $4,768,000, in the US and Canada and $2,831,000 elsewhere, making it MGM's most successful movie of the year. However, because of its high production cost, profits were only $451,000. Since the release of The Yearling, films with similar themes have been released including Old Yeller and Kes.

== Awards and nominations ==
Award	Category	Nominee(s)	Result	Ref.
Academy Awards	Best Motion Picture	Metro-Goldwyn-Mayer	Nominated	
Academy Awards	Best Director	Clarence Brown	Nominated	
Academy Awards	Best Actor	Gregory Peck	Nominated	
Academy Awards	Best Actress	Jane Wyman	Nominated	
Academy Awards	Best Art Direction – Color	Art Direction: Cedric Gibbons and Paul Groesse; Interior Decoration: Edwin B. Willis	Won	
Academy Awards	Best Cinematography – Color	Charles Rosher, Leonard Smith, and Arthur Arling	Won	
Academy Awards	Best Film Editing	Harold F. Kress	Nominated	
Academy Awards	Academy Juvenile Award	Claude Jarman Jr.	Won	
Golden Globe Awards	Best Actor in a Leading Role	Gregory Peck	Won	

== Home media ==
The Yearling was released for the first time on DVD by Warner Home Video on September 3, 2002. It was later re-issued as part of the Warner Archive Collection, a second DVD edition was released on June 24, 2014 and the Blu-ray edition was released on May 11, 2021.

== Adaptations ==
The Yearling was presented as a one-hour radio adaptation on Lux Radio Theatre on January 19, 1948, with Gregory Peck and Jane Wyman reprising their screen roles. It was also presented on Stars in the Air on February 7, 1952. This 30-minute radio adaptation starred Gregory Peck and Jean Hagen.

The Yearling (子鹿物語 THE YEARLING, Kojika Monogatari; trans. Fawn Story), also known in English as Fortunate Fawn, is a Japanese anime series from 1983, broadcast on NHK G in Japan. It was produced by MK Company and MGM Television.

The Yearling (1994) was a made-for-television remake of The Yearling, broadcast on CBS in the United States.
