= Leonard Smith (cinematographer) =

American cinematographer

Leonard Smith, A.S.C.
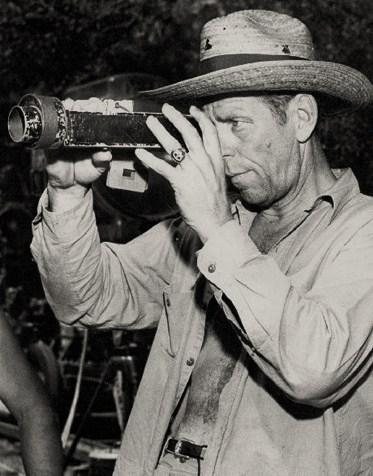
- Smith on set of The Yearling
- Born: April 19, 1894; Brooklyn, New York, U.S.
- Died: October 20, 1947 (aged 53); Los Angeles, California
- Occupation: Cinematographer
- Years active: 1915–1946

Leonard Smith (April 19, 1894 – October 20, 1947) was a cinematographer who had over 70 film credits from a career that spanned from 1915 to 1946.

== Life and career ==
Smith was born in Brooklyn, New York in 1894. His started as a cinematographer came on the now lost 1915 silent film The Battle Cry of Peace, and went on to have over 73 credits. Smith also occasionally worked in the camera and electrical department.

Smith's first Academy Award for Best Cinematography (color) nomination came in 1942, for his work on Billy the Kid, sharing the nomination with William V. Skall. In 1944, he was nominated for Lassie Come Home. Smith was again nominated in 1946 for National Velvet, and in 1947, shortly before his death, he received his sole win, for The Yearling. He shared the award with Arthur Arling and Charles Rosher. All of Smith's nominations and wins were in the Color category.

Smith served as president of the American Society of Cinematographers from 1941 until his death on October 20, 1947, at the age of 53.
