= Lake Kathryn, Florida =

Lake Kathryn, Florida Lake Kathryn Heights
- Census-designated place
- Location in Lake County and the state of Florida
- Coordinates: 29°00′05″N 81°29′45″W
- Country: United States
- State: Florida
- County: Lake

Area
  - Total: 2.88 sq mi (7.45 km^{2})
  - Land: 2.80 sq mi (7.25 km^{2})
  - Water: 0.077 sq mi (0.20 km^{2})
- Elevation: 43 ft (13 m)

Population (2020)
  - Total: 990
  - Density: 353.6/sq mi (136.53/km^{2})
- Time zone: UTC-5 (Eastern (EST))
  - Summer (DST): UTC-4 (EDT)
- ZIP code: 32767
- Area code: 352
- FIPS code: 12-38162
- GNIS feature ID: 2403194

Lake Kathryn is a census-designated place (CDP) in Lake County, Florida, United States. As of the 2020 census, Lake Kathryn had a population of 990. The area is also known as Lake Kathryn Heights. It is part of the Orlando–Kissimmee Metropolitan Statistical Area.

== Geography ==
Lake Kathryn is located in northern Lake County surrounding a small lake of the same name. It is 12 miles (19 km) west of DeLand, the nearest city, and 20 miles (32 km) northeast of Eustis. It is bordered to the north by Ocala National Forest.

According to the United States Census Bureau, the CDP has a total area of 2.88 square miles (7.45 km^{2}), of which 2.80 square miles (7.25 km^{2}) are land and 0.077 square miles (0.20 km^{2}), or 2.62%, are water.

== Demographics ==
Historical population
Census	Pop.	Note	%±
2020	990		—
U.S. Decennial Census

As of the census of 2000, there were 845 people, 344 households, and 215 families residing in the CDP. The population density was 301.8 inhabitants per square mile (116.5/km^{2}). There were 456 housing units at an average density of 162.9 per square mile (62.9/km^{2}). The racial makeup of the CDP was 96.09% White, 0.71% African American, 0.24% Native American, 0.24% Asian, and 2.72% from two or more races. Hispanic or Latino of any race were 2.01% of the population.

There were 344 households, out of which 25.3% had children under the age of 18 living with them, 49.7% were married couples living together, 6.4% had a female householder with no husband present, and 37.5% were non-families. 26.7% of all households were made up of individuals, and 12.8% had someone living alone who was 65 years of age or older. The average household size was 2.46 and the average family size was 3.00.

In the CDP, the population was spread out, with 25.1% under the age of 18, 5.6% from 18 to 24, 27.2% from 25 to 44, 24.0% from 45 to 64, and 18.1% who were 65 years of age or older. The median age was 40 years. For every 100 females, there were 108.6 males. For every 100 females age 18 and over, there were 104.2 males.

The median income for a household in the CDP was $15,733, and the median income for a family was $17,143. Males had a median income of $25,000 versus $13,750 for females. The per capita income for the CDP was $8,816. About 34.8% of families and 36.9% of the population were below the poverty line, including 36.5% of those under age 18 and 40.9% of those age 65 or over.
