= Half Moon Lake (Meeker County, Minnesota) =

Lake in the state of Minnesota, United States

- Location within Minnesota
- Location: Meeker County, Minnesota
- Coordinates: 45°11′32″N 94°34′45″W
- Type: lake

Half Moon Lake is a lake in Meeker County, in the U.S. state of Minnesota.

Half Moon Lake was named on account of its outline being shaped like a half moon.

== See also ==
- List of lakes in Minnesota
