= Half Moon Lake (Polk County, Wisconsin) =

- Location within Wisconsin Location within the United States
- Location: Polk County, near Milltown, Wisconsin
- Coordinates: 45°29′37″N 92°25′12″W
- Type: oxbow lake
- Primary inflows: spring/seepage
- Basin countries: United States
- Surface area: 579 acres (2.34 km^{2})
- Max. depth: 60 ft (18 m)
- Shore length^{1}: 7.1 mi (11.4 km)
- ^{1} Shore length is not a well-defined measure.

Half Moon Lake is located near Milltown, Wisconsin.

== Recreation ==
Half Moon Lake is located in Polk County, Wisconsin (near Balsam Lake). Many different varieties of panfish (bluegill, sunfish, black crappie, yellow perch, and rock bass) and sport fish (largemouth bass, walleye, and northern pike) can be found in the lake. Which make it a popular destination for fishermen. Other recreational activities include boating, canoeing, swimming and water-skiing in summer and ice fishing and snowmobiling in the winter. The lake has one public beach and one public boat access, both located at the north west end.
