= Half Moon Lake (Berrien County, Michigan) =

- Location within Michigan
- Location: Berrien County
- Coordinates: 41°54′45″N 86°15′39″W
- Type: lake

Half Moon Lake is a lake in Berrien County, in the U.S. state of Michigan.

Half Moon Lake was so named on account of its crescent-shaped outline.
