= Clearwater Lake Recreation Area =

Lake in the state of Florida, United States

Coordinates: 28.9796°N 81.5544°W

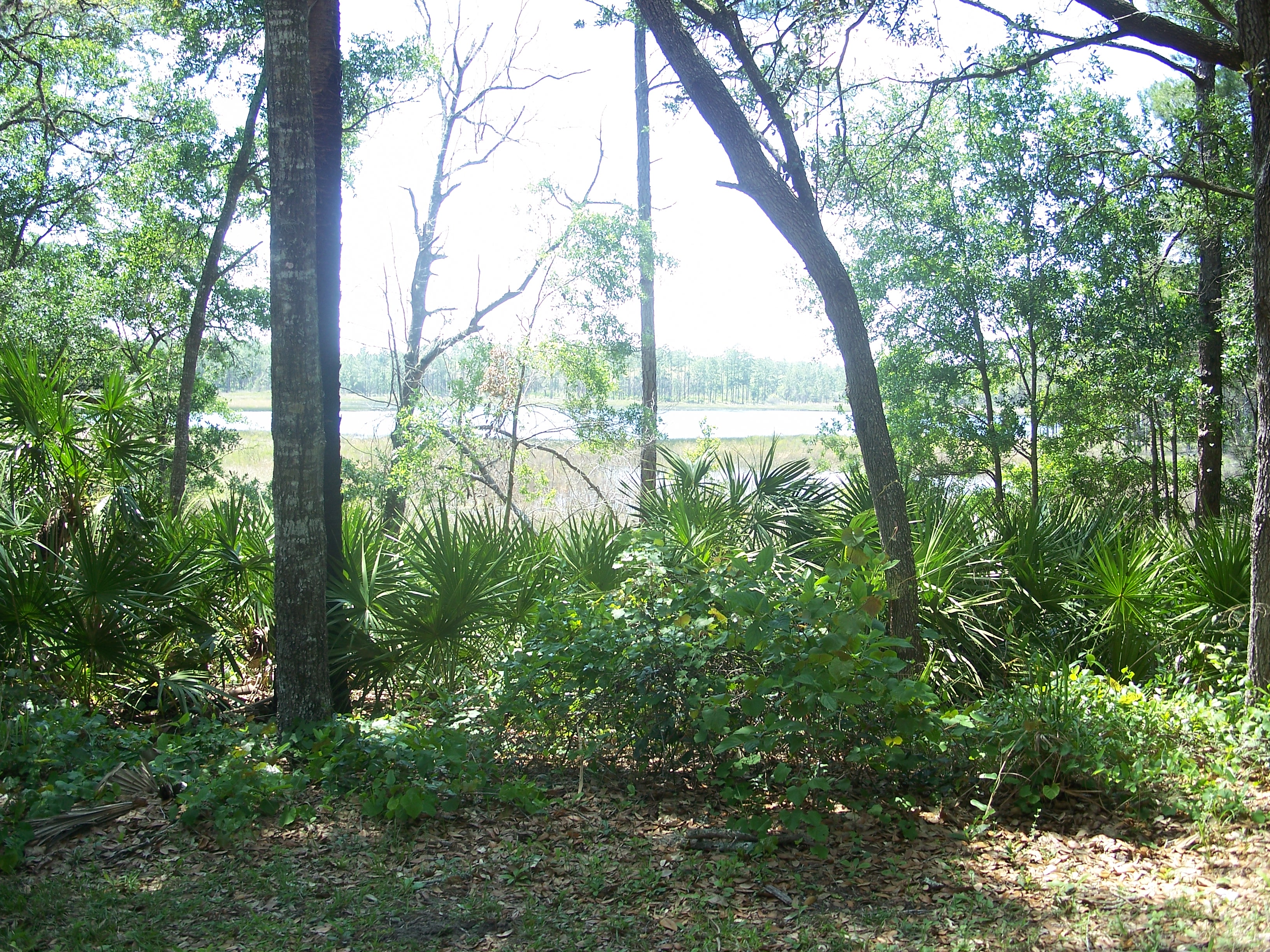
View from the Clearwater Lake Recreation Area in the Ocala National Forest

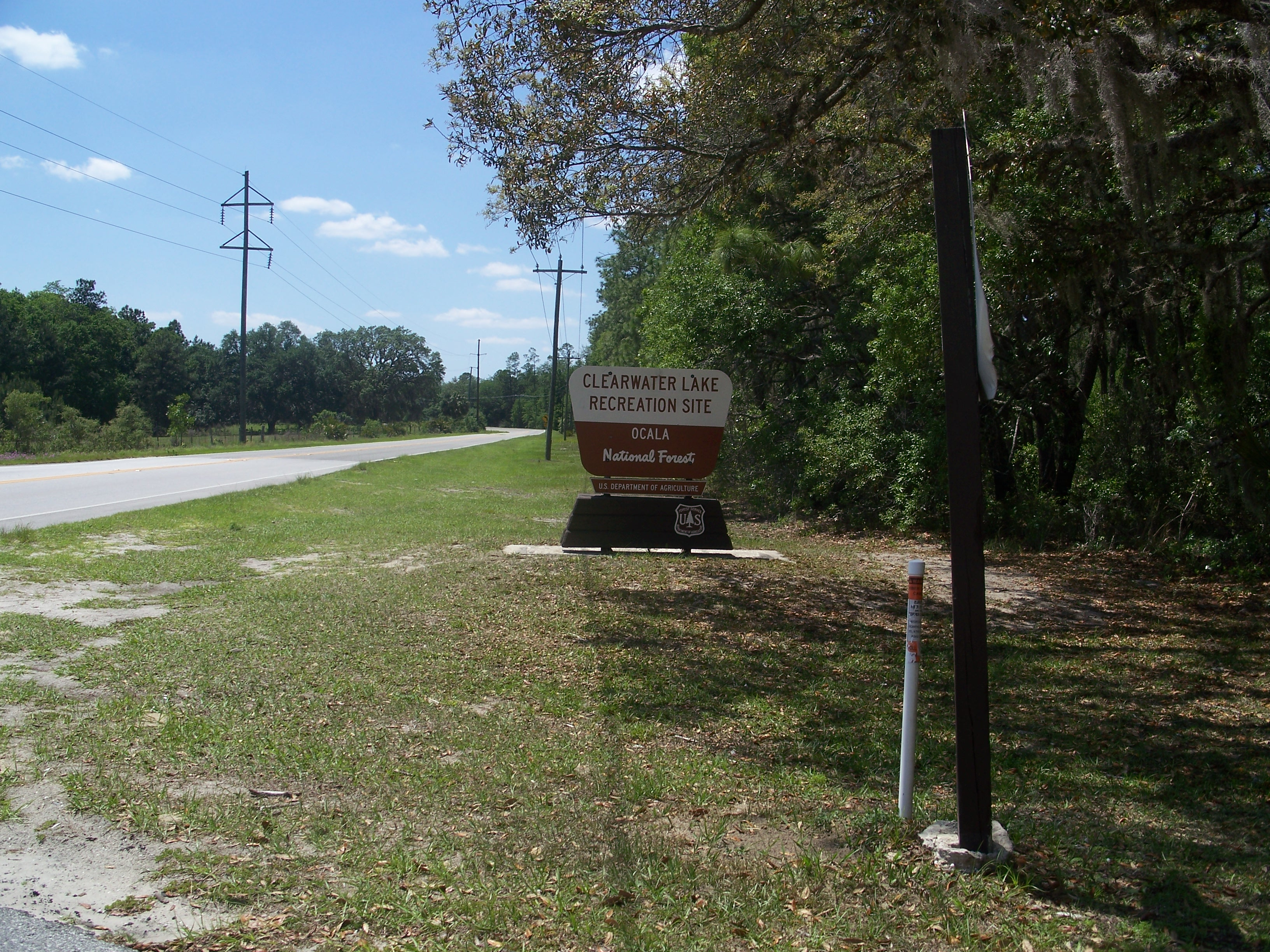
Clearwater Lake Recreation area signage on CR 42

Clearwater Lake Recreation Area and the Clearwater Lake Campground are located by Clearwater Lake along the southeastern edge of the Ocala National Forest in Central Florida outside Paisley, Florida in Lake County, Florida. The recreation area has 42 campsites, a picnic area, and a beach in an area of oak hammock at 24511 County Road 42. The lake covers 32 acres (13 ha). The recreation area has access to hiking and biking trails. Canoe rentals are offered. There is also a nature trail by the lake, mountain biking on the Paisley Woods Bicycle Trail, and access to the Florida Trail. The area is also used by kayakers.

== See also ==
- List of Florida state parks
- List of Florida state forests
