= Lake George (Florida) =

Lake in Florida, United States

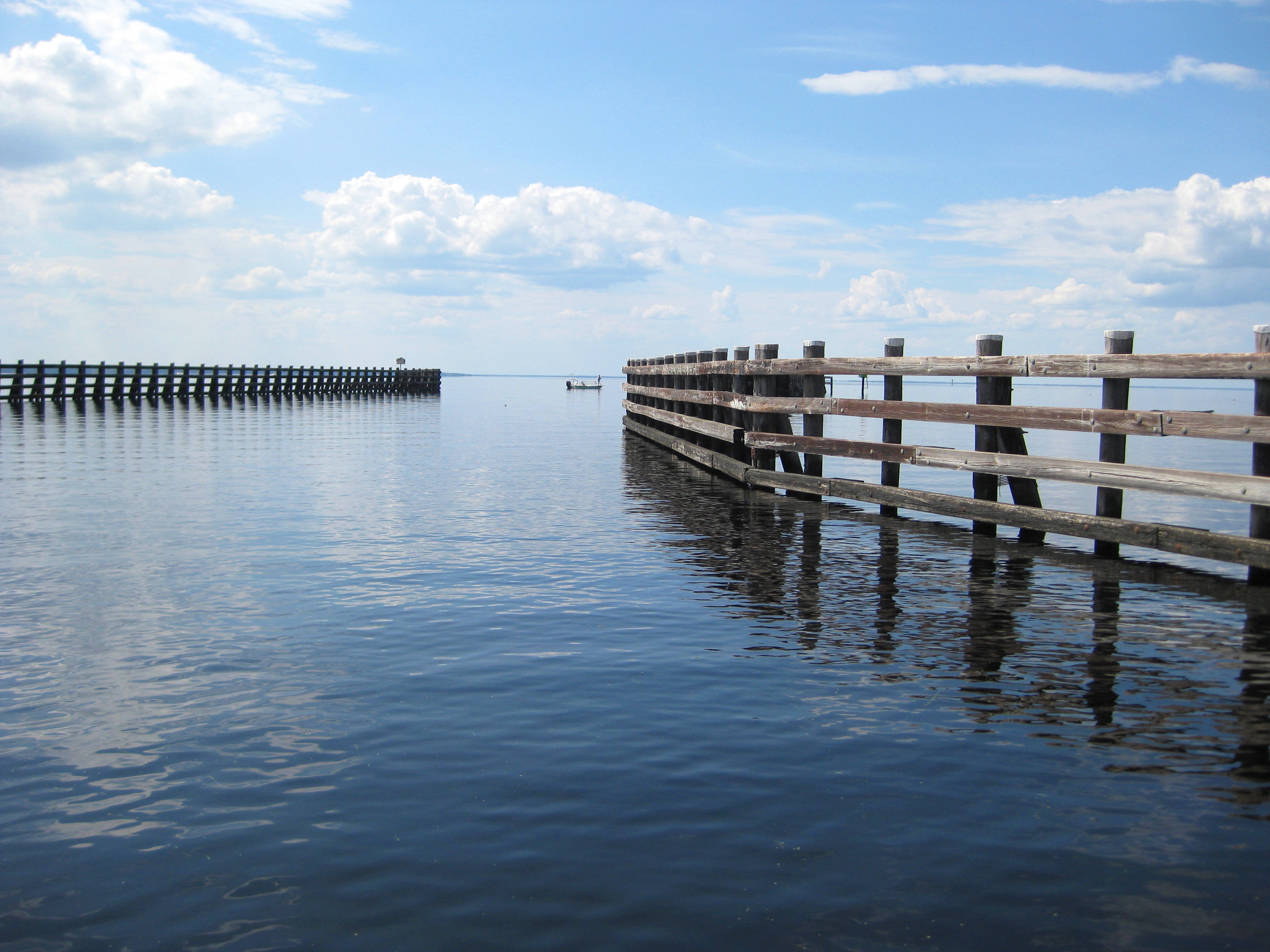
- St. Johns River channel entering Lake George from the south.

- Location within Florida Location within the United States
- Location: Volusia / Putnam counties, Florida, United States
- Coordinates: 29°17′12″N 81°35′53″W
- Primary inflows: St. Johns River; Juniper Creek; Salt Creek; Silver Glen Springs
- Primary outflows: St. Johns River
- Basin countries: United States
- Max. length: 11 mi (18 km)
- Max. width: 6 mi (9.7 km)
- Surface area: 46,000 acres (19,000 ha)
- Average depth: 8 ft (2.4 m)
- Islands: Drayton Island; Hog Island
- Settlements: Astor, Florida; Georgetown, Florida; Salt Springs, Florida; Pierson, Florida; Volusia, Florida

Lake George or Lake Welaka is a broad and shallow brackish lake on the St. Johns River in the U.S. state of Florida.

== Geography ==
The St. Johns River flows out of the lake at the north end at Rocky Point. To the west of this is Salt Cove, taking the flow from Salt Creek. Just south of Salt Cove is Lisk Point, named for a Dr. Lisk who built a house near the point. Steamboats coming down from Jacksonville made a counter clockwise loop around the lake with their first stop at Lisk Point.

Lake George is the second largest lake in Florida, after Lake Okeechobee. Lake George was the third largest lake behind Lake Apopka, but conversion of the littoral zone on the northern side of Lake Apopka to farm fields in the previous century reduced its surface area.

== History ==
The name of Lake Welaka is taken from "Welaka" (meaning "chain of lakes"), the name for the St. Johns River in Muskogee language of the Seminole. The first European to visit the lake was Pedro Menéndez de Avilés, who as the Spanish governor of Florida, explored the St. Johns River in the spring of 1596.

Later, the Florida territory was sold to Britain. The royal botanist in America to King George III, John Bartram, explored the St. Johns River in 1765. It was John Bartram who gave the lake the name Lake George, in honor of his king.

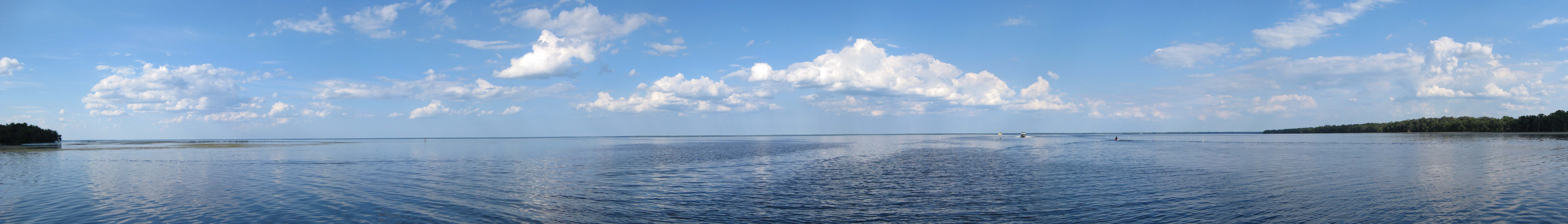
Panoramic of Lake George taken near the mouth of Silver Glen Springs

In more recent years, Lake George has been home to an operational U.S. military bombing and aerial mining range. The range is affiliated with the U.S. Navy's Pinecastle Bombing Range located in the Ocala National Forest just west of Lake George. The bombing ranges date back to World War II, when the Navy built bomb targets in Lake George and nearby Crescent Lake, and stationed personnel in the area to maintain the targets and perform search and rescue operations for downed pilots. Today, the range is under the operational control of nearby Naval Air Station Jacksonville.

The lake also hosts a wide variety of wildlife ranging from migratory water birds and alligators to a number of normally marine animals. Local springs in Lake George (and throughout the St Johns River) impart enough salt to the system to make the habitat suitable to resident and migratory marine species like Atlantic stingray, various species of mullet, striped bass and blue crabs. There is a large enough blue crab population to support a local fishery, making it one of the only fresh water blue crab fisheries in the world.

== See also ==
- St. Johns River
- Drayton Island
