= Halfmoon Lake (Florida) =

Lake in the state of Florida, United States

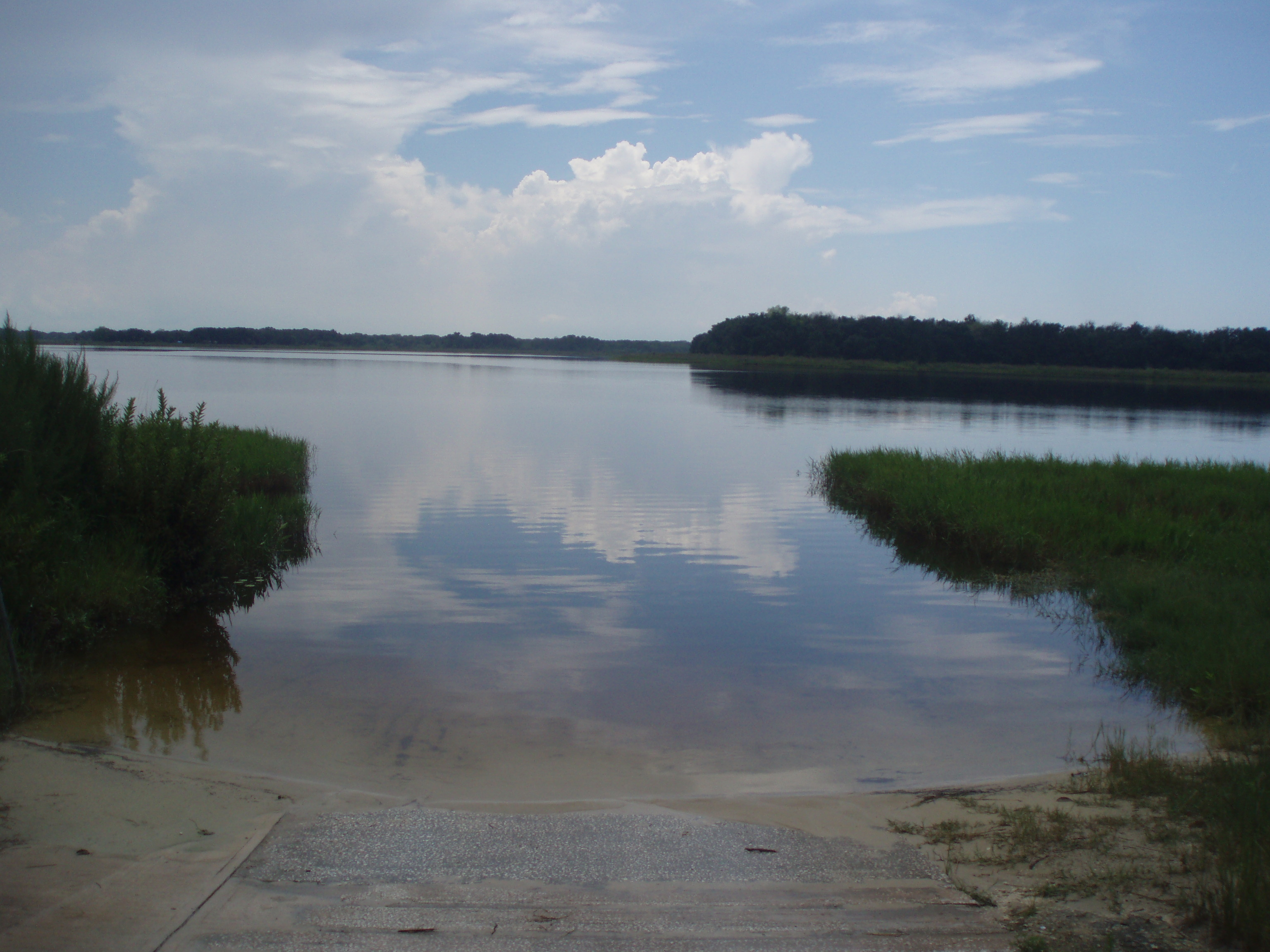
- Boat ramp at the eastern edge of Halfmoon Lake

- Location within Florida Location within the United States
- Location: Ocala National Forest, Marion County, Florida, US
- Coordinates: 29°9′12″N 81°49′56″W
- Basin countries: United States
- Surface area: 500 acres (200 ha)

Halfmoon Lake is the name of a lake in the Ocala National Forest, Florida. Halfmoon is a spring-fed freshwater lake and part of an area known as Land of Lakes with over 600 lakes and ponds in the Central Florida area.

Halfmoon Lake covers roughly 500 acres (2 km^{2}) and is situated in the Ocala Wildlife Management Area in a protected Federal Forest.
