= Alexander Springs Wilderness =

National forest located Florida

- IUCN category Ib (wilderness area)
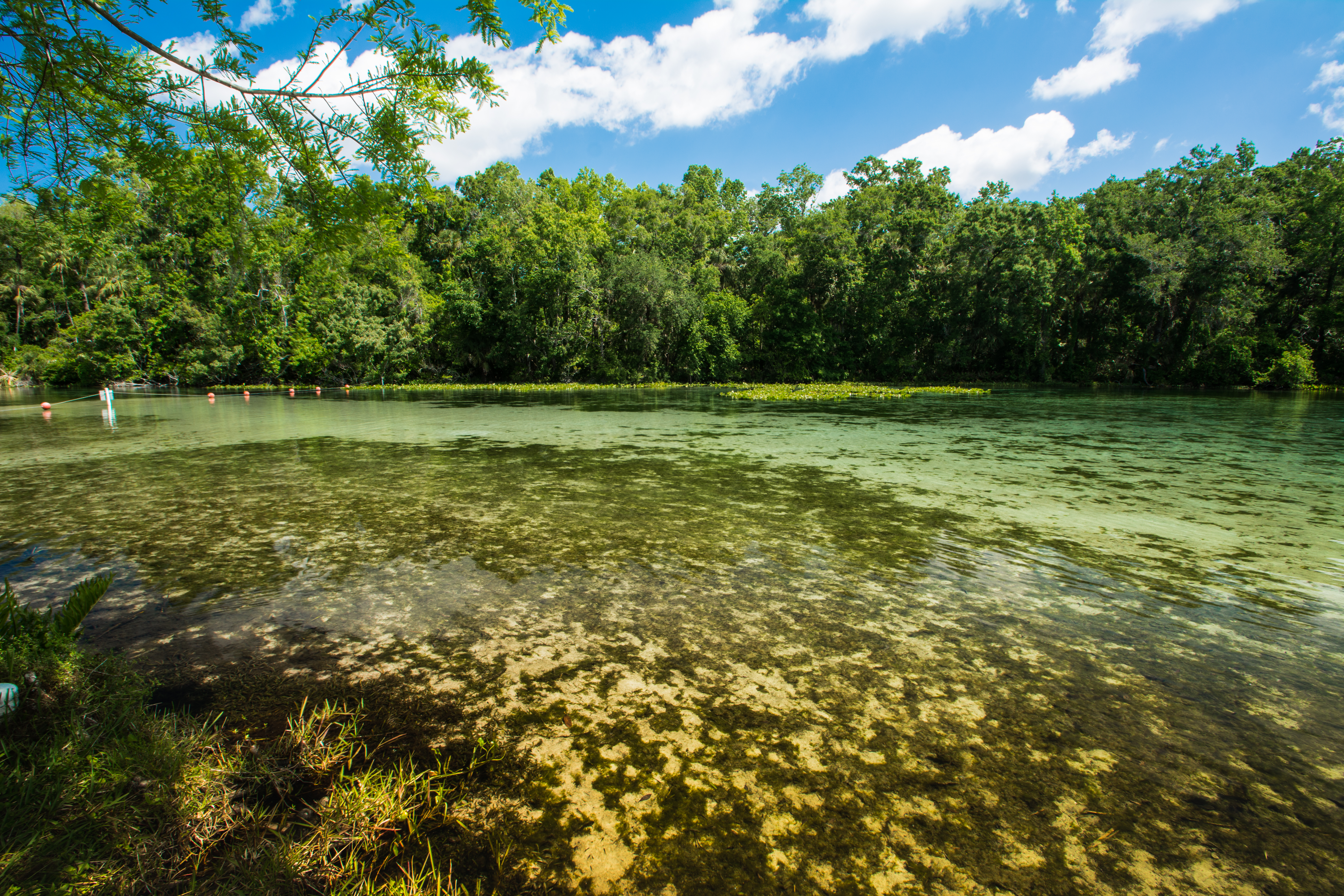
- Alexander Springs, April 2018

- Location within the United States
- Location: Lake County, Florida, United States
- Nearest city: DeLeon Springs
- Coordinates: 29°04′16″N 81°28′13″W
- Area: 7,941 acres (32.14 km^{2})
- Established: 1984
- Governing body: U.S. Forest Service

Alexander Springs Wilderness is located in the U.S. state of Florida and was designated in 1984 by the United States Congress. The wilderness has a total of 7,941 acres (32 km^{2}) and is within Ocala National Forest, which is the oldest National Forest east of the Mississippi River. Alexander Springs is home to a variety of wildlife including otters, alligators, and turtles. The wilderness also contains the only 1st magnitude spring in all the U.S. National Forests and Parks. Alexander Springs Park is open 24 hours a day for camping and many other outdoor activities.
