= Juniper Springs =

Spring in Florida, United States

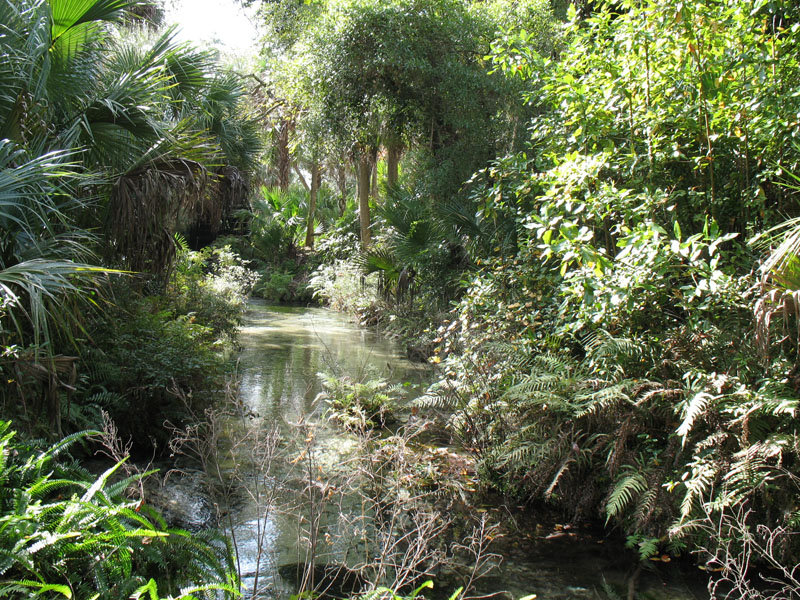
- Juniper Springs

- Location within the United States Location within Florida
- Location: Ocala National Forest, Florida, U.S.
- Nearest city: Ocala, Florida
- Coordinates: 29°11′02″N 81°42′43″W
- Established: 1908
- Governing body: National Park Service

Juniper Springs (referred to locally as "the Springs"), located in the Ocala National Forest east of Ocala, Florida, is a natural spring that forms the headwaters of Juniper Creek which winds its way to Lake George in the Saint Johns River. It is one of the oldest and best known recreation areas.

== Description ==
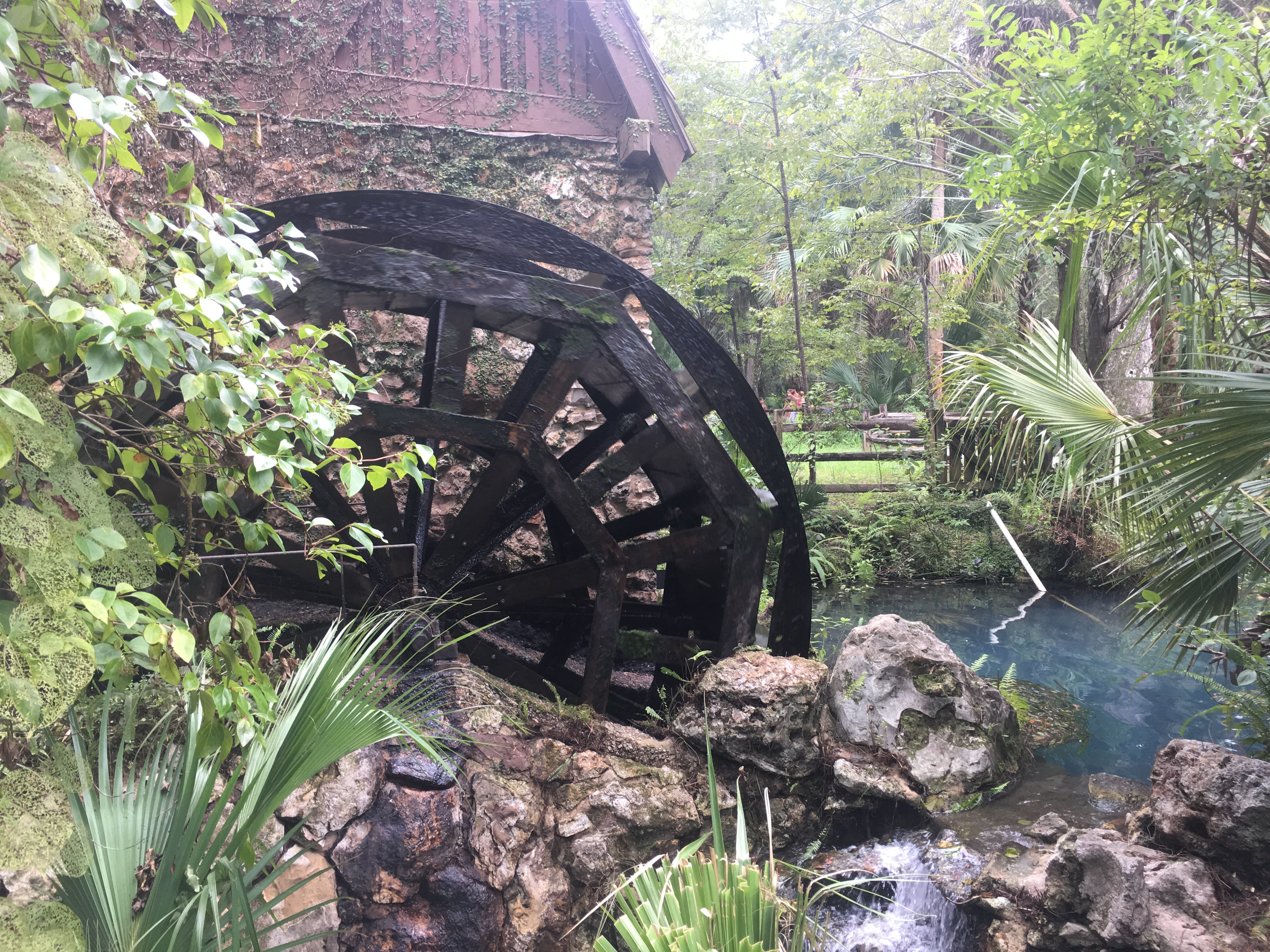
The Millhouse and waterwheel built by the CCC in 1935.

The springs, set in a subtropical forest, are in an oval-shaped pool with limestone caves present on the bottom along with areas of sand and aquatic grasses. The pool is approximately 135 ft long (41 m) and 80 ft wide (24 m) and surrounded by a basin of rock and concrete. Next to the pool is an old Civilian Conservation Corps mill house with a waterwheel that used to generate electricity from the spring’s flow for the campsite. Because the Juniper Springs spring-shed is largely within Ocala National Forest, the water isn’t affected by fertilizer and septic tanks, as are many of Florida's springs and rivers. Wildlife includes alligators, deer, raccoon, turtles, bobcats, otters, heron, and innumerable spiders.

== Recreation ==
Juniper Springs Recreation Area—which encompasses the spring, Juniper Creek, and adjoining camping and trails—is a popular recreation spot for swimming, canoeing, kayaking, camping, and hiking. Swimming is particularly popular as the water is 72 degrees, 365 days a year. The Juniper Springs canoe run is a nationally recognized attraction. The run takes between three and five hours to complete, from starting point near the Juniper Springs pool to an exit point off State Road 19 on the way to Lake George. ReserveAmerica has named Juniper one of the top 25 canoe runs in the U.S. and between 30-35 canoes and kayaks are on the water every day with a record of 100.

== Gallery ==
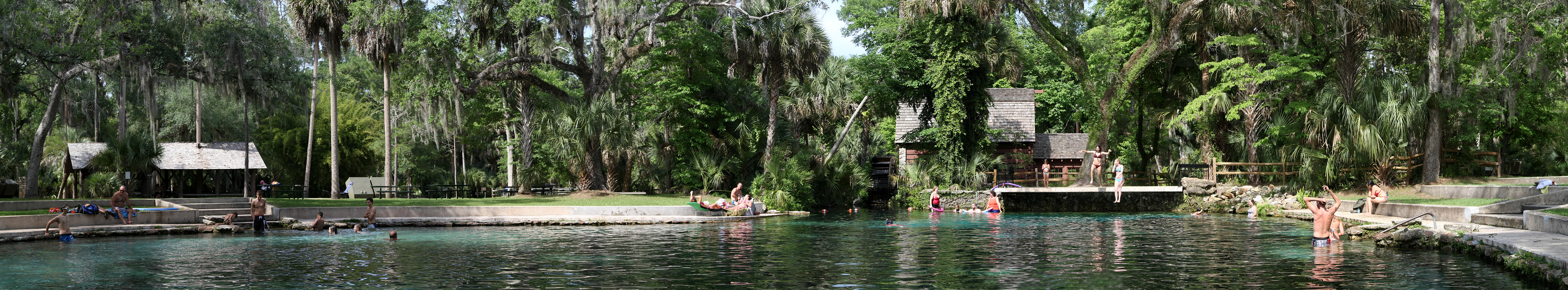
