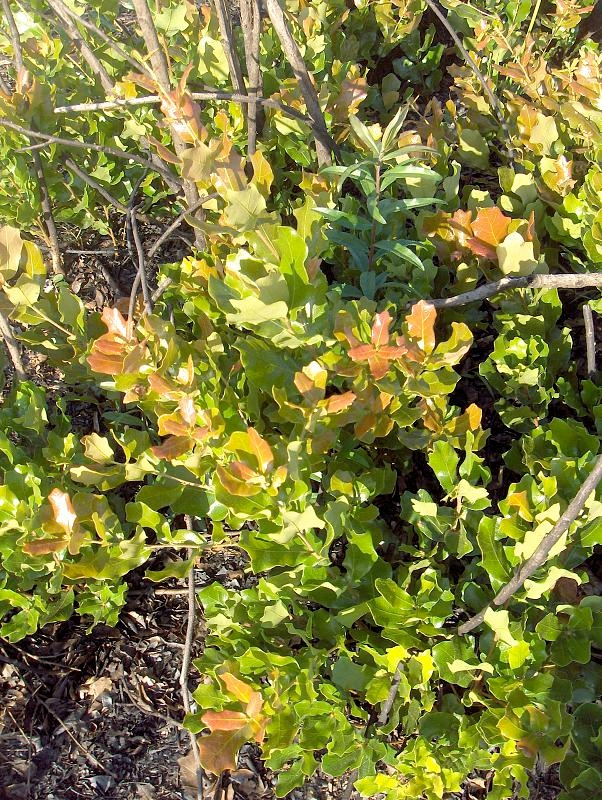

Conservation status
- Least Concern (IUCN 3.1)

- Apparently Secure (NatureServe)

Scientific classification
- Kingdom: Plantae
- Clade: Embryophytes
- Clade: Tracheophytes
- Clade: Spermatophytes
- Clade: Angiosperms
- Clade: Eudicots
- Clade: Rosids
- Order: Fagales
- Family: Fagaceae
- Genus: Quercus
- Subgenus: Quercus subg. Quercus
- Section: Quercus sect. Quercus
- Species: Q. chapmanii

Binomial name
- Quercus chapmanii Sarg.
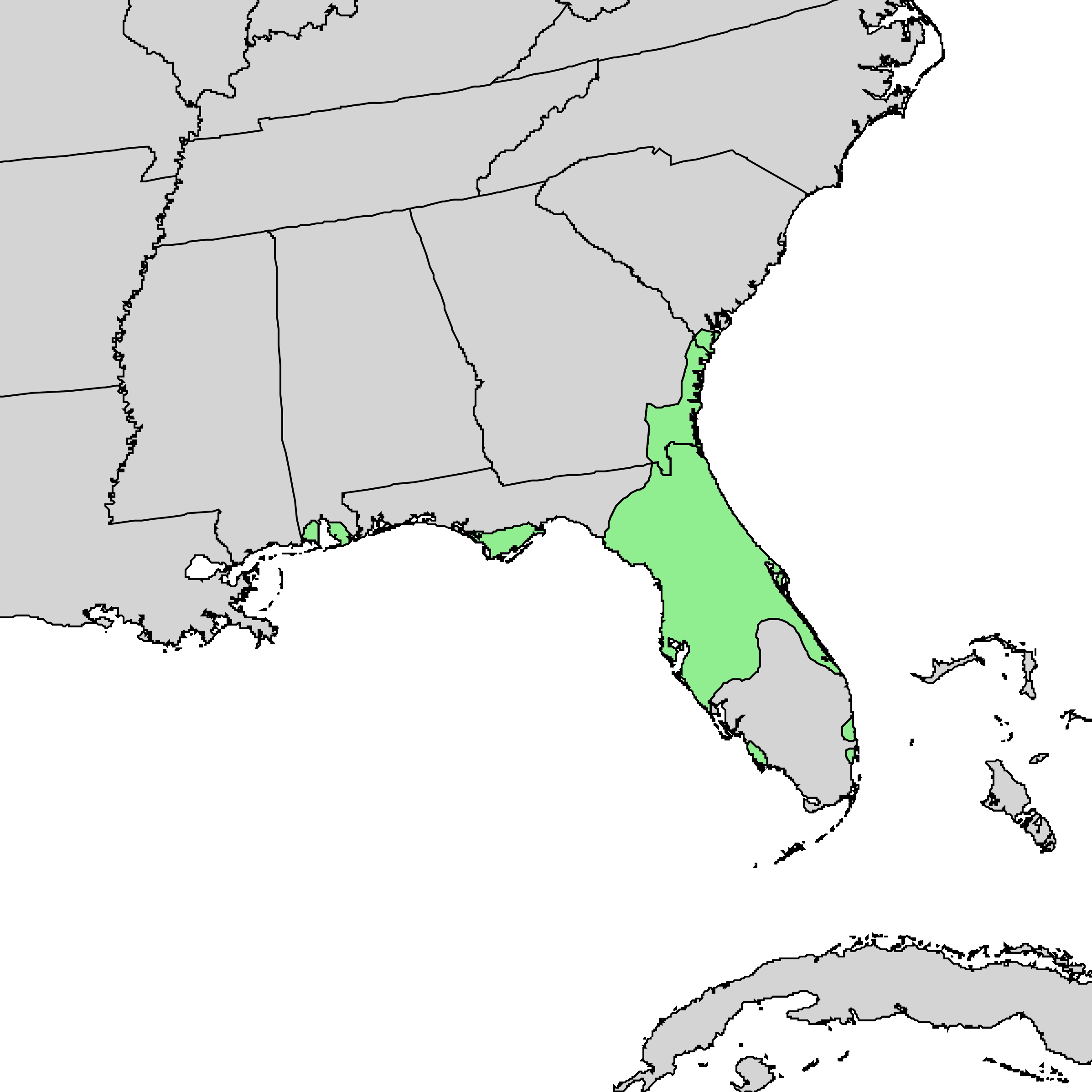
- Natural range of Quercus chapmanii

Synonyms
- Quercus maritima W.Bartram; Quercus obtusiloba var. parvifolia Chapm.

= Quercus chapmanii =

Chapman oak

Species of oak tree

Quercus chapmanii, commonly referred to as the Chapman oak, is a species of oak that grows in the southeastern United States.

== Description ==
Quercus chapmanii is a shrub or small tree occasionally reaching a height of 6 meters (20 feet) but usually less. Leaves sometimes have no lobes, sometimes wavy rounded lobes.

== Distribution ==
Quercus chapmanii is found in the states of Alabama, Florida, Georgia, and South Carolina.
