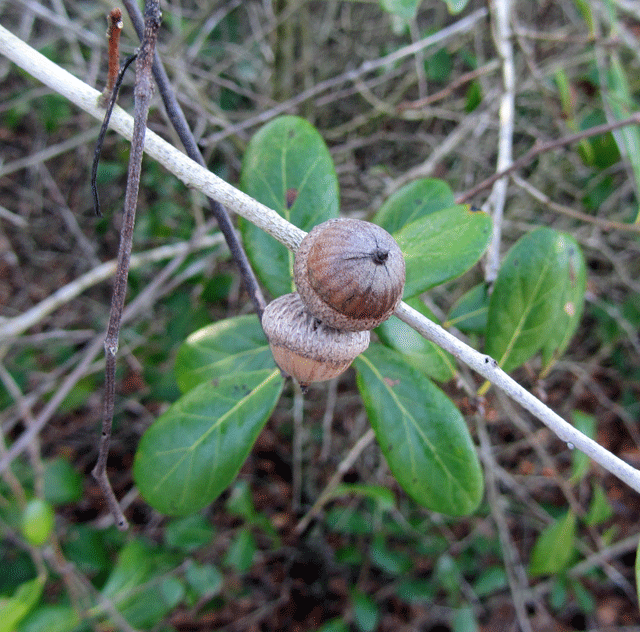
- Leaves and acorns of myrtle oak

Conservation status
- Least Concern (IUCN 3.1)

Scientific classification
- Kingdom: Plantae
- Clade: Embryophytes
- Clade: Tracheophytes
- Clade: Angiosperms
- Clade: Eudicots
- Clade: Rosids
- Order: Fagales
- Family: Fagaceae
- Genus: Quercus
- Subgenus: Quercus subg. Quercus
- Section: Quercus sect. Lobatae
- Species: Q. myrtifolia

Binomial name
- Quercus myrtifolia Willd.
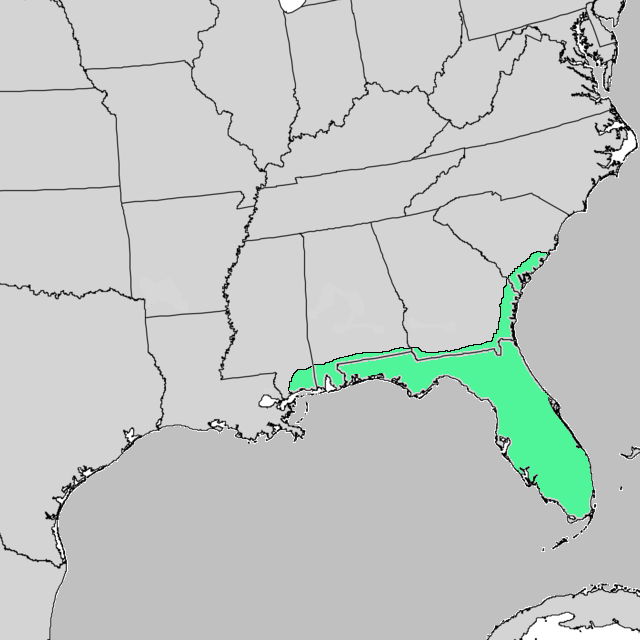

Synonyms
- List: Quercus aquatica var. myrtifolia (Willd.) A.DC.; Quercus myrtifolia f. ampla Trel.; Quercus nitida Raf.; Quercus phellos var. arenaria Chapm.; Quercus phellos var. myrtifolia (Willd.) Wenz.

= Quercus myrtifolia =

Myrtle oak

Species of oak tree

Quercus myrtifolia, the myrtle oak, is a North American species of oak. It is native to the southeastern United States (Mississippi, Alabama, Florida, Georgia, South Carolina). It is often found in coastal areas on sandy soils.

It is an evergreen tree that can reach 12 meters (39 feet) tall, also appearing as a shrub in drier sites. It has leaves with no teeth or lobes, which are hairless on the upperside and also on the underside except along the veins.

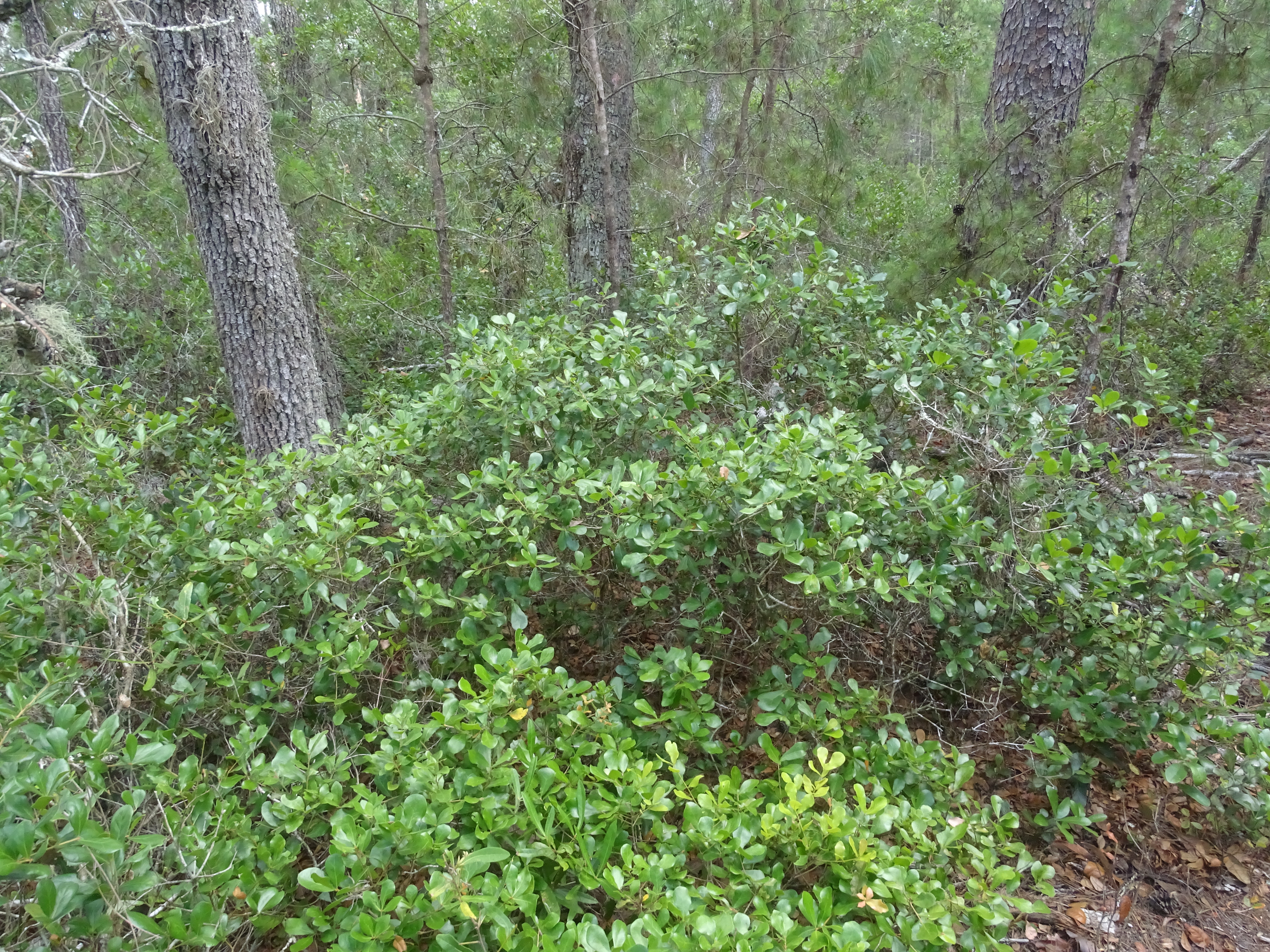
Myrtle oak exhibiting a shrubby growth form

== Taxonomy ==
This plant was first identified by Carl Ludwig von Willdenow. Some synonyms for Quercus myrtifolia are Quercus nitida, Quercus aquatica var. myrtifolia, Quercus myrtifolia f. ampla, Quercus phellos var. arenaria, and Quercus phellos var. myrtifolia. The common name is the Myrtle Oak

== Description ==
The Myrtle Oak often grows as a shrub, but can also take the form of a tree. In maturity it grows to 15–20 feet (4.6–6.1 m) tall and 8–10 feet (2.4–3.0 m) wide. It is considered a red oak. The leaves are simple alternate. They appear dark green with a yellow-green underside. The leaves have a leathery texture, and an obovate shape. There are small hairs on the underside of the leaves. The acorns are about 1/2 inch (13 mm) long, and mature in 18 months. Small green flowers bloom in April–May. It has a grey smooth stem that furrows in maturity. Twigs can be reddish brown when they are younger. A commonly associated oak of Q. myrtifolia is Quercus geminata. However, the leaf of Q. geminata is a narrow elliptic shape and has a wrinkled appearance. Quercus myrtifolia also grows better in shaded and upper dune environments.

== Distribution ==
Quercus myrtifolia is present in the southeastern United States. It occurs in sandy soils along coastlines up to 350 feet (110 m) above sea level. Habitats are dry sandy ridges in scrub oak forests with yellow pines, and dry-site hardwood forests. The most common trees it grows with are Quercus incana, Quercus laevis, Quercus marilandica, Quercus margaretta, Quercus geminata, and Quercus virginiana.

== Uses ==
This plant is mostly used in gardening as a backdrop or accent plant. It is very low maintenance and its evergreen leaves provide cover during the winter. It may also have medicinal uses. The bark may be used as an antiseptic and hemostatic. It may even be useful for treating tooth aches, gastropathies, and burns, and to reduce inflammation. These types of medicinal uses are typical of many oak trees.

== Climate resiliency ==
Increased levels of CO_{2} in the environment of Quercus myrtifolia led to a decrease in leaf area. Additionally, this also led to an increase in sugar and starch content. Higher levels of CO_{2} led to lower occurrence of leaf asymmetry this can better protect leaves from leaf miners. Prescribed burns may be beneficial to the recruitment of Q. myrtifolia seedlings. It is also possible that mature Myrtle Oaks eventually stop producing acorns making fires important for the growth of new trees. Prescribed burns may be beneficial to the recruitment of Q. myrtifolia seedlings. Quercus myrtifolia displays resiliency to prescribed and lightning caused burns on the Florida Lake Wales Ridge. After palmetto scrub fires Q. myrtifolia managed to reach preburn values within 5 years. Seasonal drought can have a large impact on the Q. myrtifolia. A dry spring season is known to greatly decrease its growth rate. Myrtle Oak is also considered to be extremely wind resistant.

== Pests ==
A variety of insects feed on the Myrtle Oak including oak skeletonizer, leaf miner, galls, oak lace bugs, borers, and caterpillars. Burrowing beach mice threaten acorns even when protected by cages. Hibiscus mealybugs are also known to host in the tree. Like all oaks, Quercus myrtifolia is susceptible to oak wilt. Seeds with holes in them may be infested with weevils.

== Cultivation ==
The Myrtle Oak can be used as an accent plant in garden settings. Despite this it is rarely available in nurseries. If growing a Myrtle Oak one should plant in full sun and well drained soil. It is very drought resistant. If it is planted outside it should be protected from pests, and buried at a depth equal to the diameter of the acorn.

== Conservation ==
Myrtle Oak is considered critically imperiled in South Carolina, imperiled in Mississippi, and vulnerable in Georgia.
