= Orange Creek =

Stream in Island Grove, Florida, United States

Location
- Country: United States
- State: Florida
- County: Alachua, Marion, Putnam
- District: SJRWMD

Physical characteristics
- Source: Orange Lake
  - location: Island Grove, Florida
  - coordinates: 29°26′30″N 82°06′32″W
- Mouth: Ocklawaha River
  - location: Orange Ferry, Florida
  - coordinates: 29°30′28″N 81°54′55″W
- Length: 20 mi (32 km)
- Basin size: 600 mi^{2} (1,600 km^{2})(including internal drainage); 515 sq mi (1,330 km^{2}) (excluding internal drainage)

Orange Creek is a small stream in north-central and northeast Florida, that drains Orange Lake to the Ocklawaha River. Privately owned Orange Springs provides part of the water volume.

== Description ==
Part of the Ocklawaha River drainage basin, Orange Creek rises at the southern end of Orange Lake in southeastern Alachua County, Florida. It flows generally eastwards for approximately 20 miles (32 km), forming the boundary between Marion and Putnam Counties, before draining into the Ocklawaha River near Orange Springs. The creek's outflow enters the Oklawaha near Orange Ferry, along the stretch of river where the Ocklawaha is impounded to form Rodman Reservoir, part of the abandoned Cross Florida Barge Canal; the creek was considered to be a significant source of water for the reservoir, providing a 20-year mean discharge of 188 cubic feet per second (5.3 m^{3}/s) as of 1973. The record flow at that time was 2,170 cubic feet per second (61 m^{3}/s). The creek is canoeable along its length, and is known for its fishing for bass and other gamefish.

== Orange Creek basin ==
Orange Creek receives surface runoff from an area of 515 sq mi (1,330 km^{2}). Water from Lochloosa Lake flows into Orange Lake through Cross Creek and directly into Orange Creek where it leaves Orange Lake. Lochloosa Lake is fed by Lochloosa Creek, which arises in northern Alachua County. Orange Lake receives the outflow of Newnans Lake through Prairie Creek, Camp's Canal and the River Styx. Hatchett Creek, Little Hatchett Creek and Lake Forest Creek, which arise in northern Alachua County, flow into Newnans Lake. The combined area providing surface runoff to Lochloosa Lake and Orange Lake is 323 sq mi (840 km^{2}).

Prairie Creek, the principal outlet of Newnans Lake, originally drained into Paynes Prairie. The Camp family, which owned Paynes Prairie and operated a cattle ranch on it, wanted to drain the prairie to improve it as pasture. After very heavy rain flooded the Prairie in 1927, the Camps commenced projects to lower the water table on the Prairie that included diverting Prairie Creek to the River Styx, which flows into Orange Lake.

== Internal drainage ==
West of the Orange Creek basin in Alachua County is an area of internal drainage with subsurface outflow (cryptorheic basin). The St. Johns River Water Management District includes this area in the Orange Creek basin. The 21,000-acre (85 km^{2}) Paynes Prairie drains into the Alachua Sink. A number of springs and small streams in Alachua County flow into Paynes Prairie, into other sinkholes, or into swamps that have no surface outlet. Such springs and streams include Blues Creek, Boulware Spring, Cellon Creek, Glen Spring, Hogtown Creek, Mill Creek, Possum Creek, Sweetwater Branch, Tumblin Creek (a tributary of Bivens Arm), and Turkey Creek. Lake Alice, which receives runoff from about 60 percent of the University of Florida main campus, has no surface outlet, with ground seepage historically keeping the lake from overflowing.

== Tributaries ==
A tributary, Little Orange Creek, joins from the north a few miles above the mouth of the creek. In the late 1800s several mills were located along Little Orange Creek.

== Controversies ==
A dispute between Alachua, Marion and Putnam Counties arose in the 1960s over where their county lines lay with regards to the course of the creek. A dam impounds Orange Lake at its exit into the creek; it was the source of controversy in the late 1980s with some calling for its removal.
