= List of Outstanding Florida Waters =

List of waterways worthy of special protection in Florida, United States

Outstanding Florida Waters are rivers, lakes and other water features designated by the Florida Department of Environmental Protection (DEP) under authority of Section 403.061 (27), Florida Statutes as "worthy of special protection because of their natural attributes." Outstanding Florida Waters have special restrictions on any new activities that would lower water quality or otherwise degrade the body of water.

The Outstanding Florida Water designation has been applied to all bodies of water in national parks, national wildlife refuges, national seashores, national preserves, national marine sanctuaries and estuarine research reserves, state parks and recreation areas, state preserves and reserves, state ornamental gardens and botanical sites, environmentally endangered lands programs, conservation and recreation lands programs, Save Our Coast program acquisitions, state aquatic preserves, scenic and wild rivers (both national and state), and certain waters in national forests. The DEP has also designated these 'special' Outstanding Florida Waters:

- Apalachicola River
- Aucilla River
- Blackwater River
- Butler Chain of Lakes
- Chassahowitzka River System
- Chipola River
- Choctawhatchee River
- Clermont Chain of lakes
- Crooked Lake
- Crystal River
- Econlockhatchee River System
- Estero Bay tributaries
- Florida Keys
- Hillsborough River
- Homosassa River System
- Kingsley Lake and Black Creek (North Fork)
- Lake Disston
- Lake Powell
- Lemon Bay estuarine system
- Little Manatee River
- Lochloosa Lake
- Myakka River (lower part)
- Ochlockonee River
- Ocklawaha River
- Orange Lake, River Styx, and Cross Creek
- Perdido River
- Rainbow River
- St. Marks River
- Santa Fe River system
- Sarasota Bay estuarine system
- Shoal River
- Silver River
- Spruce Creek
- Suwannee River
- Tomoka River
- Wacissa River
- Wakulla River
- Weekiwachee riverine system
- Wekiva River
- Wiggins Pass estuarine system

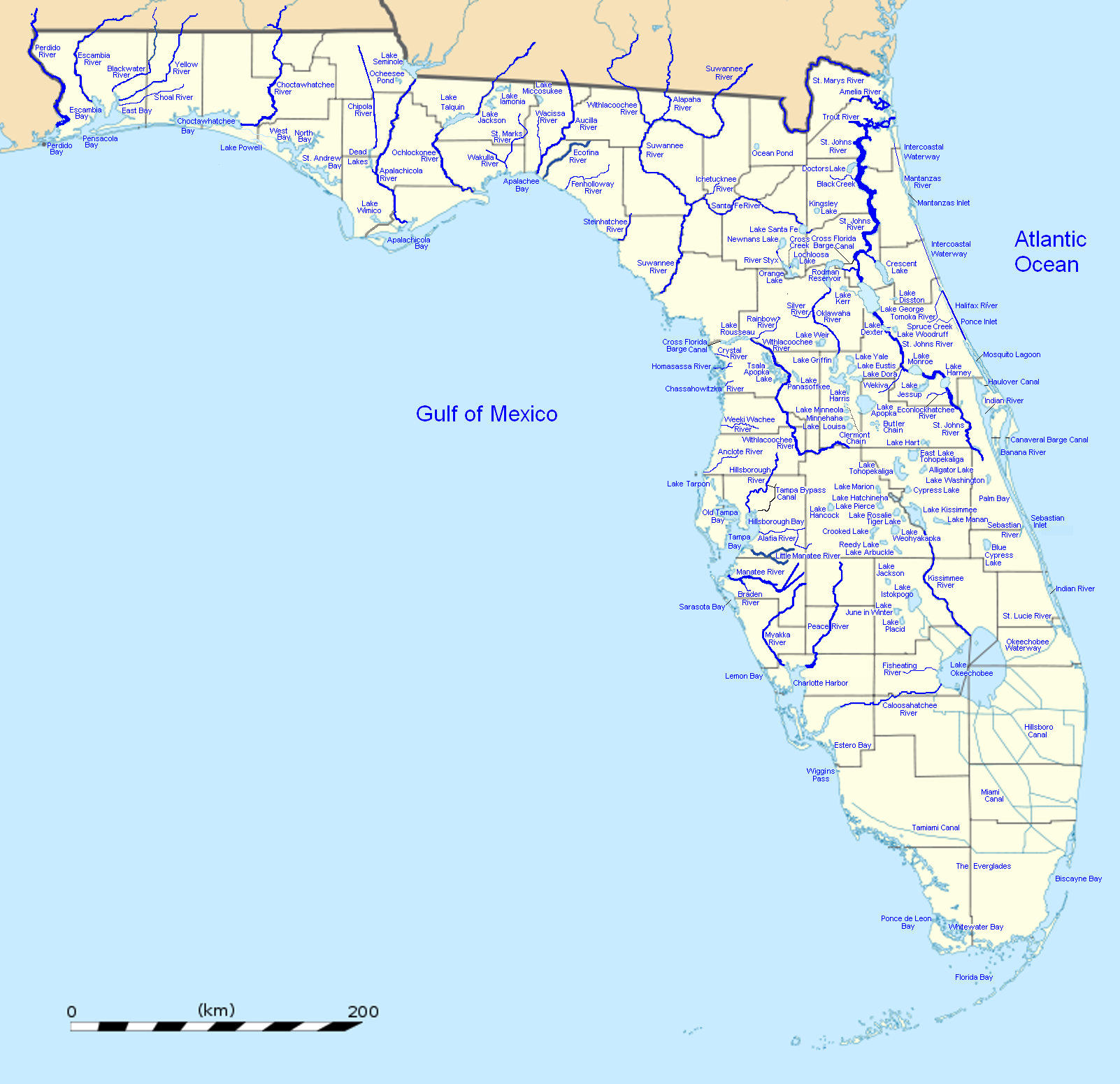

== See also ==
- List of rivers of Florida
- List of major springs in Florida
