= Welaka State Forest =

Forest in North Central Florida

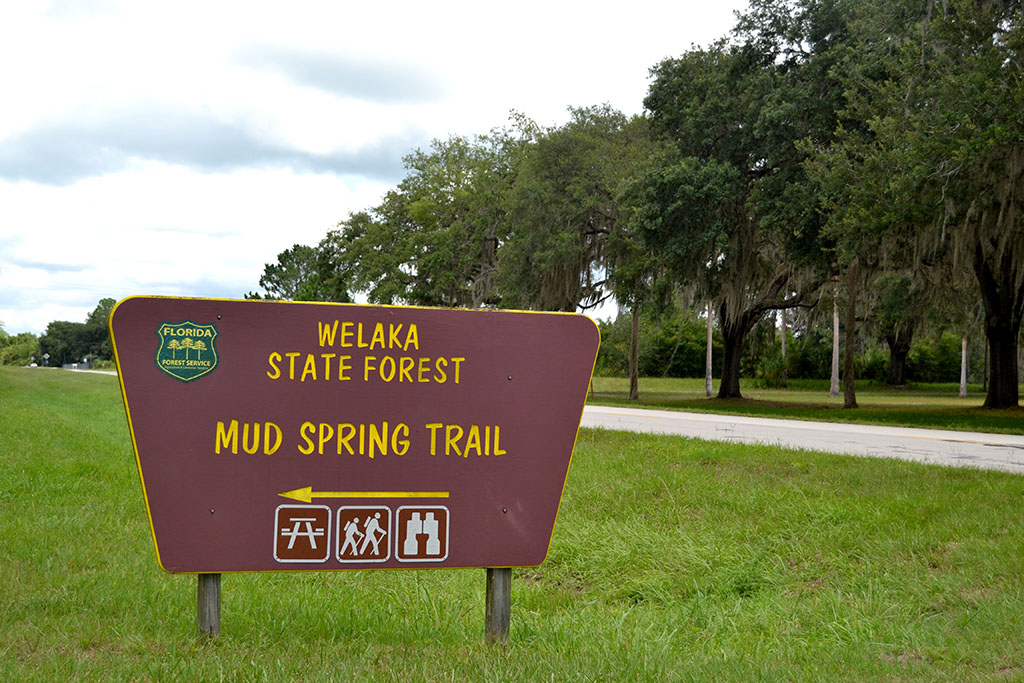
- Sign for the Mud Spring Trail within the Welaka State Forest

- Map of Florida
- Location: Putnam County, Florida
- Nearest city: Welaka
- Coordinates: 29.45°N 81.66°W
- Area: 2,287 acres (926 ha)
- Governing body: Florida Department of Agriculture and Consumer Services

The Welaka State Forest is in the U.S. state of Florida. The 2,287-acre (9 km^{2}) forest is located in North Central Florida, upstream from Welaka on the eastern bank of the St. Johns River. Welaka State Forest is adjacent to the Mount Royal site discussed by William Bartram in chapter 4 of Bartram's Travels.

Welaka State Forest is located along Putnam County Road 309 between two portions of the Welaka National Fish Hatchery. The Beecher Unit which is located in Fruitland and the Welaka Unit located in Welaka.

== History ==
The federal government began the Welaka Forestry and Wildlife Conservation Project in 1935 under the Resettlement Administration. The property later became a University of Florida reserve for forestry and wildlife research; in 1992, its lease was transferred to the Florida Forest Service for management as a state forest.

== See also ==
- List of Florida state forests
- List of Florida state parks
