= Barge Canal =

Barge Canal may refer to one of these projects:

- Canaveral Barge Canal, in Brevard County, Florida
- Cross Florida Barge Canal, a never-completed project to connect the St. Johns River to the Gulf of Mexico
- St. Johns-Indian River Barge Canal, another cancelled project
- New York State Barge Canal, the successor to the Erie Canal
