= Ocklawaha River =

River in Florida, United States of America

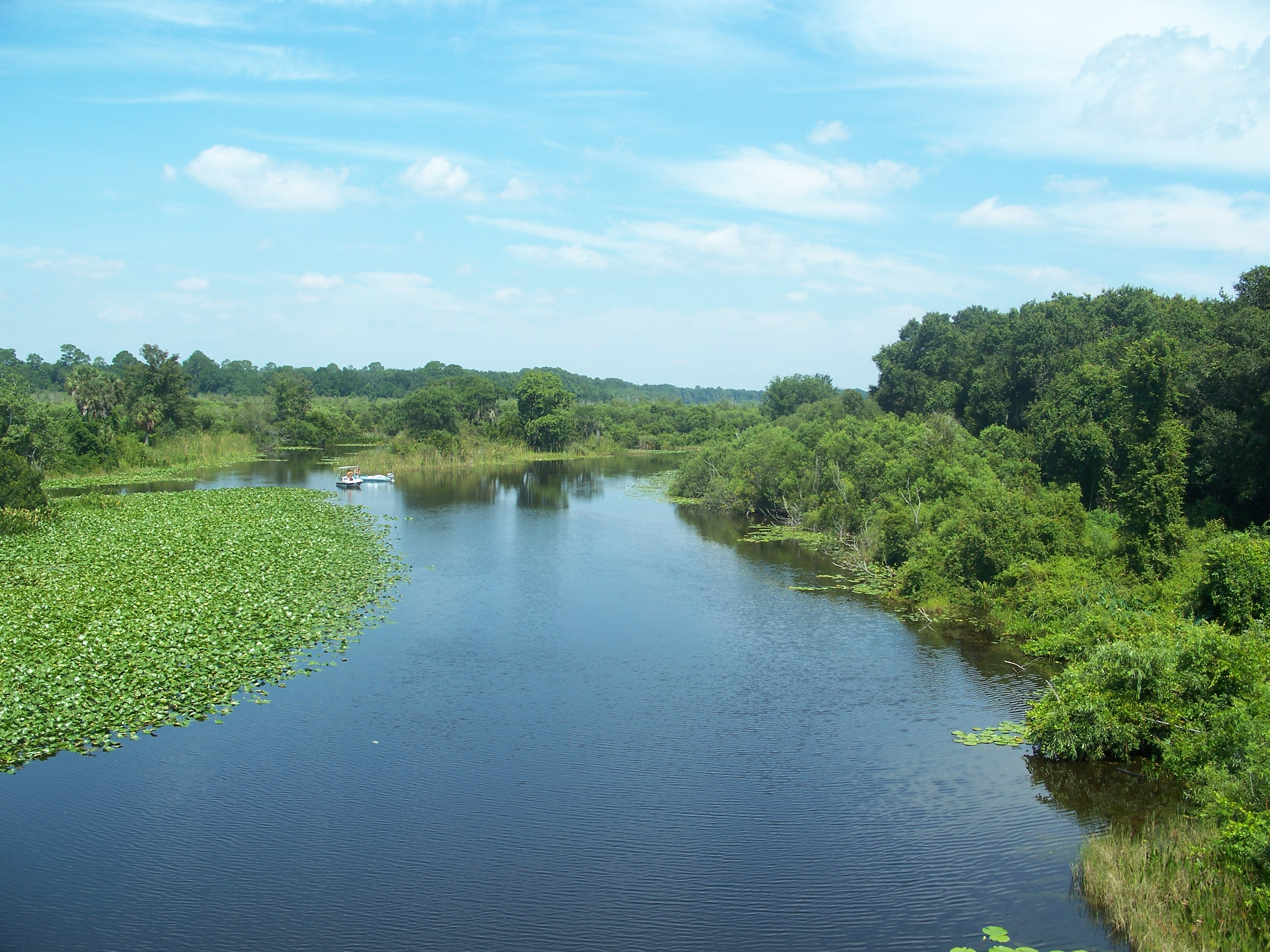
- Looking north on CR 42

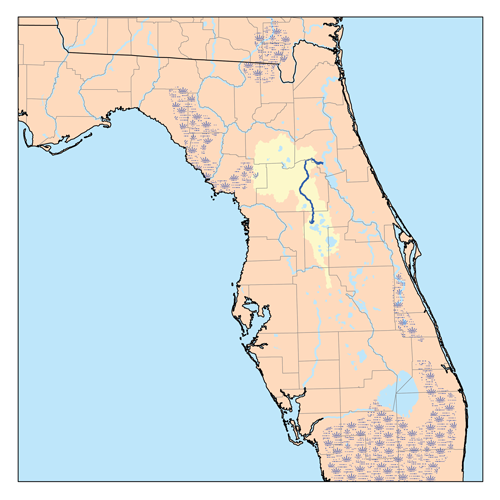
- Ocklawaha River map

Location
- Country: United States
- State: Florida

Physical characteristics
- Source
  - location: Harris chain of lakes
  - elevation: 0 ft (0 m)
- Mouth
  - location: St. Johns River
- Length: 74 mi (119 km)

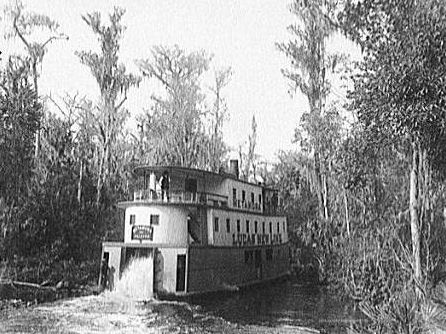
Metamora paddle wheel steamboat on the Ocklawaha c. 1902. Did tours from Palatka to Silver Springs

The 74-mile-long (119 km) Ocklawaha River flows north from central Florida until it joins the St. Johns River near Palatka. Its name is derived from ak-lowahe, Creek for "muddy".

The historical and original source of the Ocklawaha River is Lake Griffin, part of the Harris chain of lakes in Lake County, Florida. The river now receives discharge from the entire Harris Chain of Lakes, including Lake Eustis, Lake Harris, Lake Dora, Lake Beauclair and Lake Apopka, via a series of man-made canals and natural waterways including Haynes Creek, the Dead River, the Dora Canal, and the Apopka-Beauclair Canal. The addition of the canals has increased both the discharge and amount of runoff pollution carried into the river. The Ocklawaha River watershed includes parts of the Green Swamp, most of Lake County, and portions of Marion, Alachua and Putnam counties. The largest of several large lakes in the Ocklawaha's watershed is Lake Apopka near Orlando.

The Ocklawaha River is the principal tributary of the St. Johns River. The most important and well-known tributary of the Ocklawaha is the Silver River, which carries the discharge from Silver Springs. Another important tributary of the Ocklawaha is Orange Creek, which originates from Orange Lake, which is fed by Lochloosa Lake via Cross Creek and by Newnans Lake, via the Prairie Creek. From Prairie Creek, only half of its water is artificially diverted towards Orange Lake via the Camps Canal, the rest flows to its historic destination, Paynes Prairie.

The river was used extensively in the 19th century and early 20th century for steamboat transportation, most famously the Hart Line operated by Hubbard L. Hart. Narrow steamboats such as the Alligator were used to navigate the constrictive and winding river. In the 1870s, the route between Palatka and Silver Springs became very popular and was travelled by prominent figures such as Harriet Beecher Stowe, Ulysses S. Grant, Thomas Edison and Mary Todd Lincoln to visit Silver Springs. The scenic trip up the river added a sense of adventure to a visit to Silver Springs. The popularity of the river route to Silver Springs declined after the arrival of railroad service to Ocala in 1881.

The river and its source tributaries are navigable for most of their length. The Silver River is easily accessible and very popular with boaters. Orange Creek is navigable for most of its length by canoe. Most non-canoe navigation ends with Lake Apopka. Aids to navigation along the main river and its source tributaries include:

- Rodman Reservoir, where the river is impounded at Rodman Dam (later renamed the George Kirkpatrick Dam). The Cross Florida Barge Canal is navigable through the Buckman Lock with elevation changes of 19.2 feet.
- The Burrell Lock and Dam on Haynes Creek.
- The Dora Canal.
- The Apopka-Beauclair Canal.

The river has suffered severe ecological damage in the 20th century from impoundment, fertilizer runoff, dredging, pollution and rerouting. In the 1960s and 1970s, Marjorie Harris Carr led the successful campaign to stop construction of the Cross Florida Barge Canal, which would have dammed the river at two points and created two artificial reservoirs to facilitate navigation along the canal; however, the river is still blocked by Rodman Dam. Florida Defenders of the Environment, which Carr co-founded in 1969, continues to push for the preservation and restoration of the Ocklawaha River.

The river is a popular place to canoe, kayak and fish. The river forms the western boundary of the Ocala National Forest. Portions of the river remain mostly undisturbed by man. The natural landscapes and lush wildlife and growth of the outlying area are mostly hydric hammocks and flatwoods, with scrub pine ridges and sugar sandy soils. Wildlife is abundant, including wild turkey, white-tailed deer, and wading birds in this area. Outdoor recreational activities include hunting, fishing, wildlife viewing, hiking, horseback riding, and paddling, although there are few established trails.

The Gores Landing unit of Ocklawaha River Wildlife Management Area consists of almost 3,000 acres (12 km^{2}) along the Ocklawaha River in eastern Marion County. The Ocklawaha River basin is a primary tributary of the St. Johns River Water Management District.

== List of crossings ==
| Crossing | Carries | Image | Location | Coordinates |
|---|---|---|---|---|
| Headwaters (Lake Griffin) | | | | 28°21′39″N 81°49′8″W |
| 160210 | CR 42 | | Starke's Ferry | 28°21′39″N 81°49′8″W |
| | Moss Bluff Dam and Lock | | Moss Bluff | |
| 140018 | CR 464C | | Moss Bluff | |
| | Unnamed Road | | Ocklawaha Prairie Restoration Area | 29°5′57″N 81°54′49″W |
| Sharpes Ferry Bridge; 364186 | CR 314 | | Silver Springs State Park | 29°11′00.6″N 81°59′33.5″W |
| Confluence with Silver River | | | Silver Springs State Park | |
| R.N. Bert Dosh Memorial Bridge | SR 40 | | Silver Springs State Park | 29°12′50.4″N 81°59′9.6″W |
| Confluence with Strouds Creek | | | Ocklawaha River Wildlife Management Area | |
| Confluence with Dead River | | | Ocklawaha River Wildlife Management Area | |
| Confluence with Eaton Creek | | | Ocklawaha River Wildlife Management Area | |
| 364040 | CR 316 | | Fort McCoy | 29°22′19.5″N 81°53′43.8″W |
| | Northeast 152nd Place (Abandoned Route 316 Bridge) | | Fort McCoy | |
| Confluence with Cross Florida Barge Canal | | | Lake Ocklawaha | |
| | George Kirkpatrick Dam | | Lake Ocklawaha | 29°2′45″N 82°27′53″W |
| | SR 19 | | Ocala National Forest | 29°1′31″N 82°40′9″W |
| Mouth (St. Johns River) | | | | 28°59′39″N 82°45′30″W |

== See also ==
- List of Florida rivers

== Notes and references ==
- St. Johns River Water Management District (2003). "Ocklawaha Chain of Lakes fact sheet" (PDF). Archived from the original (PDF) on 2007-10-28.
- Florida Office of Greenways and Trails (2006). "Regulations Summary for Gores Landing Unit" (PDF). Archived from the original (PDF) on May 24, 2011.
- Peggy Macdonald, Marjorie Harris Carr: Defender of Florida's Environment, University Press of Florida, 2014.
