= Marjorie Harris Carr =

American environmentalist

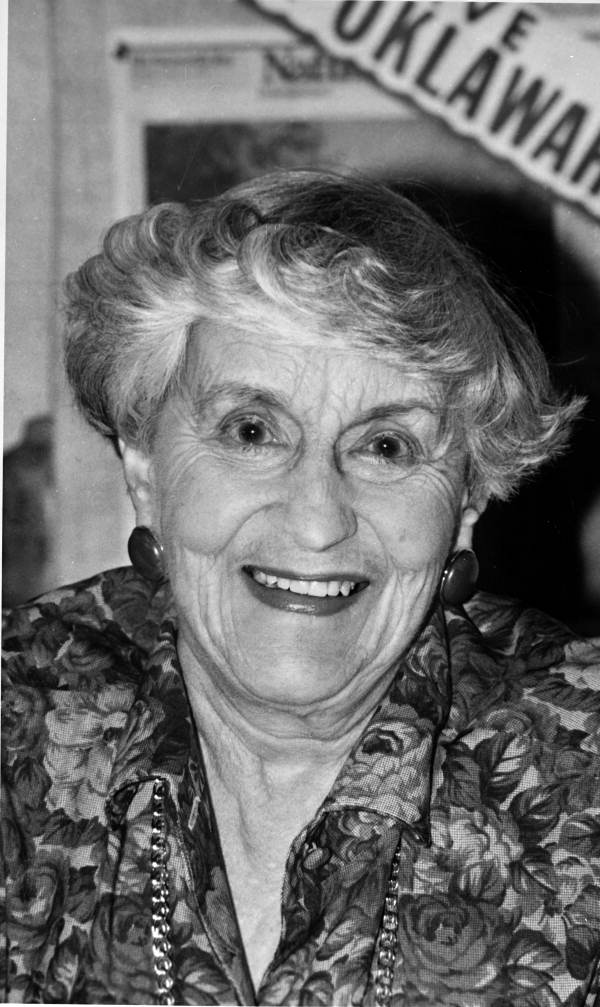
- Born: March 26, 1915; Boston, Massachusetts
- Died: 10 October 1997 (aged 82)
- Education: University of Florida; Florida State University
- Known for: Notable environmentalist
- Spouse: Archie Carr
- Awards: Florida Governor's Award for Outstanding Conservation Leadership (1970), National Wildlife Federation's Conservation Service Award (1976), New York Zoological Society's Gold Medal (1978), Florida Audubon Society's Conservationist of the Year Award (1984), Teddy Roosevelt Conservation Award (1990), Florida Women's Hall of Fame (1996), Florida Wildlife Federation Conservation Hall of Fame (1997)
- Scientific career
- Fields: Zoology; Ornithology
- Workplaces: Welaka National Fish Hatchery; Bass Biological Laboratory; Gainesville Garden Club; Alachua Audubon Society; Florida Conservation Foundation; Florida Defenders of the Environment
- Thesis: The Breeding Habits, Embryology and Larval Development of the Large-mouthed Black Bass in Florida with Notes on the Feeding Habits of the Fry (1942)

Marjorie Harris Carr (March 26, 1915 – October 10, 1997) was an American scientist and environmental activist, well known for her conservation work in Florida. She was born in Boston and grew up in southwest Florida, where her parents taught her about native flora and fauna. After earning a Master of Science degree from the University of Florida in 1942, she went on to establish and lead several conservation efforts in the state, including co-founding the Alachua Audubon Society in 1960 and co-founding Florida Defenders of the Environment in 1969. Her work with Florida Defenders of the Environment — which continued until her death in 1997 — to preserve the Ocklawaha River Valley helped halt construction of the Cross Florida Barge Canal, which is now a public conservation and recreation area named in her honor in 1998. She was inducted in the Florida Women's Hall of Fame in 1996. She was married to herpetologist Archie Carr from 1937 until his death in 1987; they had five children.

== Early life ==
Born in Boston, Massachusetts, Carr was raised in southwest Florida, where her naturalist parents taught her how to identify the state's native flora and fauna while on nature hikes and while horseback riding to school. In 1918, her parents moved the family from Boston to Bonita Springs, Florida, and later relocated to Fort Myers in 1928, where she attended high school.

== Education and early career ==
Carr graduated from Fort Myers Senior High School in 1932, and enrolled in Florida State University (which at the time was the Florida State College for Women). Her studies included biology, ecology, botany, ornithology, and bacteriology. In 1936, she received a Bachelor of Science degree in zoology from Florida State University.

Denied admission or funding to graduate programs in zoology and ornithology at Cornell University and the University of North Carolina due to her gender, Carr took a position as the nation's first female wildlife technician at the U.S. Fish and Wildlife Service Welaka National Fish Hatchery. In 1937, she took a position as laboratory technician and field collector at the Bass Zoological Lab in Englewood, Florida. In 1939, Carr was admitted to a graduate program in zoology at the University of Florida. At the time, UF was still officially an all-male institution, but Carr was able to leverage her husband's reputation within the biology department to obtain admission.

In 1942, she earned a Master of Science degree in zoology from the University of Florida. Her thesis work was entitled "The Breeding Habits, Embryology and Larval Development of the Large-mouthed Black Bass in Florida with Notes on the Feeding Habits of the Fry" and was later published in the scientific journal Proceedings of the New England Zoology Club. She published "Notes on the Breeding Habits of the Eastern Stumpknocker Lepomis punctatus punctatus (Cuvier)" in the Quarterly Journal of the Florida Academy of Sciences in 1946.

From 1945 until 1949, Carr and her family lived in Honduras, where she explored the rainforest daily with her husband, Archie Carr. Marjorie completed thousands of scientific bird skins and later published her research on the birds of Honduras, including "The San Geronimo Swift in Honduras" in the Wilson Bulletin in 1951, and "Notes on the Birds of Honduras for the Years 1945-1949, with Special Reference to the Yeguare River Valley, Department of Francisco Morazan" in Ceiba in 1995.

== Conservation work in Florida ==
In the late 1950s, Carr launched her career in conservation and environmental activism in Florida. Her early efforts were focused in Alachua County and included the preservation and restoration of Lake Alice on the University of Florida campus in 1969 and the establishment of Paynes Prairie Preserve State Park in 1970. She began work on Paynes Prairie preservation in 1957 when she joined the Gainesville Garden Club, and served on the club's board of directors from 1958 through 1962. She also co-founded the Alachua Audubon Society in 1960 and served on its board of directors from 1960 through 1968 and again from 1972 through 1980. She also served on the board of directors for the Florida Conservation Foundation from 1971 through 1990.

In 1969, Carr co-founded Florida Defenders of the Environment (FDE) with fellow Alachua Audubon society member David Anthony and began her work leading conservation efforts on the Ocklawaha River Valley ecosystem. She helped write one of the nation's first environmental impact statements in support of a lawsuit brought by FDE and the Environmental Defense Fund against the United States Army Corps of Engineers for environmental impacts of the Cross Florida Barge Canal on the Ocklawaha River ecosystem. As part of this work, Carr also prepared and gave a statement for FDE to the Senate Committee on Environment and Public Works in 1978. Carr continued to work on Ocklawaha River conservation, including removal of the Rodman Dam and Reservoir, and to preserve parks and green spaces in Florida for nearly 30 years until her death in 1997. Florida Defenders of the Environment remains an active environmental conservation organization with a primary mission to "restore the Ocklawaha River."

== Marjorie Harris Carr Cross Florida Greenway ==
The Barge Canal was officially deauthorized by Congress in 1990, and all lands and structures associated with the project were transferred to the state of Florida for use as a public conservation and recreation area. The Florida Governor and Cabinet signed a resolution to deauthorize the Canal on January 22, 1991. The lands transferred to the state of Florida became the Cross Florida Greenway State Recreation and Conservation Area. Carr was appointed by the Florida legislature to the Canal Lands Advisory Committee in 1991 to represent the public at large and help create a master plan for the Greenway.

In 1998, the Greenway was officially renamed the Marjorie Harris Carr Cross Florida Greenway in Carr's honor. The Greenway runs 110 miles and comprises more than 70,000 acres through portions of Citrus, Levy, Marion, and Putnam counties, from Yankeetown on the Gulf of Mexico to south of Palatka on the St. Johns River. It is part of the system of Florida State Parks and is managed by the Florida Department of Environmental Protection, Division of Recreation and Parks.

== Honors and awards ==
Marjorie Harris Carr won a number of awards and honors for her work. As detailed by Peggy Macdonald, her awards included:

- 1965: Florida Audubon Society's Award of Merit
- 1970: Florida Governor's Award for Outstanding Conservation Leadership
- 1973: National Federation of Business and Professional Women's Club's Headline Award
- 1974: Fairchild Tropical Garden's Thomas Barbour Award
- 1976: National Wildlife Federation's Conservation Service Award
- 1978: New York Zoological Society's gold medal for achievement in biological conservation
- 1984: Florida Audubon Society's Conservationist of the Year Award
- 1988: Became a scientific fellow of the New York Zoological Society (Currently known as the Wildlife Conservation Society)
- 1990: Teddy Roosevelt Conservation Award
- 1991: Alexander Calder Conservation Award for Special Achievement
- 1991: Unsung Hero Award by the Miami Hosting Committee of the United Nations Environmental Program's Global Assembly of Women and the Environment
- 1996: Inducted into the Florida Women's Hall of Fame
- 1997: Inducted into the Florida Wildlife Federation's Conservation Hall of Fame
- 1998: The lands for the Cross Florida Barge Canal right-of-way is renamed the Marjorie Harris Carr Cross Florida Greenway

== Additional authored works ==
As compiled by Peggy Macdonald in her 2014 University Press of Florida biography of Marjorie Harris Carr.

- 1965: "The Oklawaha River Wilderness" in Florida Naturalist.
- 1967: "What Do Users Want? Wilderness!" in the Proceedings of the Annual Meeting of the Southeastern Section of the Society of American Foresters.
- 1970: "Modulated Reproductive Periodicity in Chelonia" in Ecology.
- 1970: "Recruitment and Remigration in a Green Turtle Nesting Colony" in Conservation Biology.
- 1971: "The Fight to Save the Ocklawaha" at the Twelfth Biennial Sierra Club Wilderness Conference in Washington, D.C.
- 1972: "Site Fixity in Caribbean Green Turtles" in Ecology.
- 1976: "An Interim Report on the Cross-Florida Barge Canal" In Defense of Rivers, A Citizen's Workbook: Impacts of Dam and Canal Projects. Delaware Valley Conservation Association, pp 138–46.
- 1978: Archie F Carr, Marjorie H Carr and Anne B Meylan. "The West Caribbean green turtle colony" in Bulletin of the American Museum of Natural History.
- 1989: Marjorie Harris Carr, John Hankinson, and Florida Defenders of the Environment. Restoring the Ocklawaha River Ecosystem.
- 1992: Edits and writes the foreword to republication of Archie Carr's High Jungles and Low.
- 1992: Edits "The Case for Restoring the Free-Flowing Ocklawaha River" with David Godfrey, Jack Kaufmann, and Jeanne Marie Zokovitch.
- 1993: Edits republication of Archie Carr's Ulendo: Travels of a Naturalist In and Out of Africa.
- 1994: Edits a collection of essays by her late husband entitled, A naturalist in Florida: a celebration of Eden.
