= Lake Rousseau =

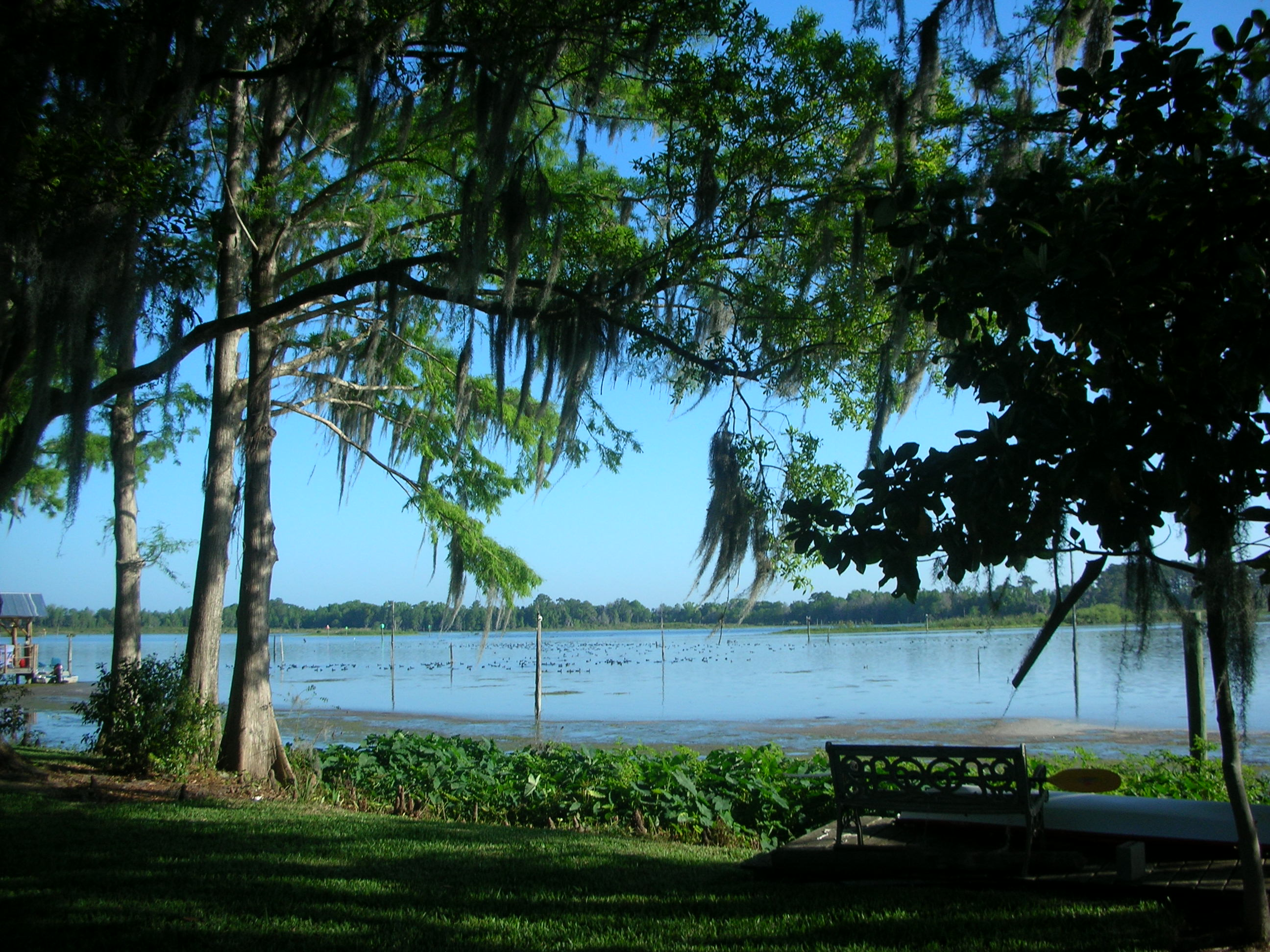
- View of the lake from the south shore

- Location within Florida Location within the United States
- Location: Citrus / Levy / Marion counties, Florida, United States
- Coordinates: 29°01′31″N 82°34′46″W
- Type: reservoir
- Primary inflows: Withlacoochee River, Rainbow River
- Primary outflows: Withlacoochee River
- Basin countries: United States
- Max. length: 12 mi (19 km)
- Max. width: 1 mi (1.6 km)
- Surface area: c. 3,700 acres (15 km^{2})
- Surface elevation: 26 ft (8 m)
- Settlements: Dunnellon

Lake Rousseau is a reservoir on the Withlacoochee River in central Florida, on the boundary of Levy County to the north-west, Marion County to the north-east, and Citrus County to the south. It was created in the early 1900s when the river was dammed. Florida Power Corp operated a hydroelectric plant from 1909 to 1965 at the western end of the lake. Power output was approximately 10,000 HP, or 7.45 MW.

The lake is about 35 miles (56 km) west of Ocala and 10 miles (16 km) east from the Gulf Coast. As well as forming part of the Withlacoochee River, it is also fed by the Rainbow River and Lake Panasoffkee to the east. It is approximately twelve miles long by one mile wide, covering an area of c. 3,700 acres (15 km^{2}). To the west is part of the uncompleted Cross Florida Barge Canal leading to the Gulf.

The lake forms the centerpiece for the Lake Rousseau State Recreation Area and Campground.
