= Lake Beauclair =

Lake in the state of Florida, United States

- Location within Florida
- Location: Lake County, Florida
- Coordinates: 28°46′26″N 81°39′36″W
- Type: lake
- Surface area: 1,134-acre (459 ha)

Lake Beauclair is a 1,134-acre (459 ha) lake in the central part of the U.S. state of Florida. It is part of the Lake Harris Chain of Lakes (along with Lake Dora and Lake Carlton) within the Ocklawaha River watershed. In 2012 a dredging project was conducted to improve water quality.
