= Lochloosa Creek =

River in Florida, United States

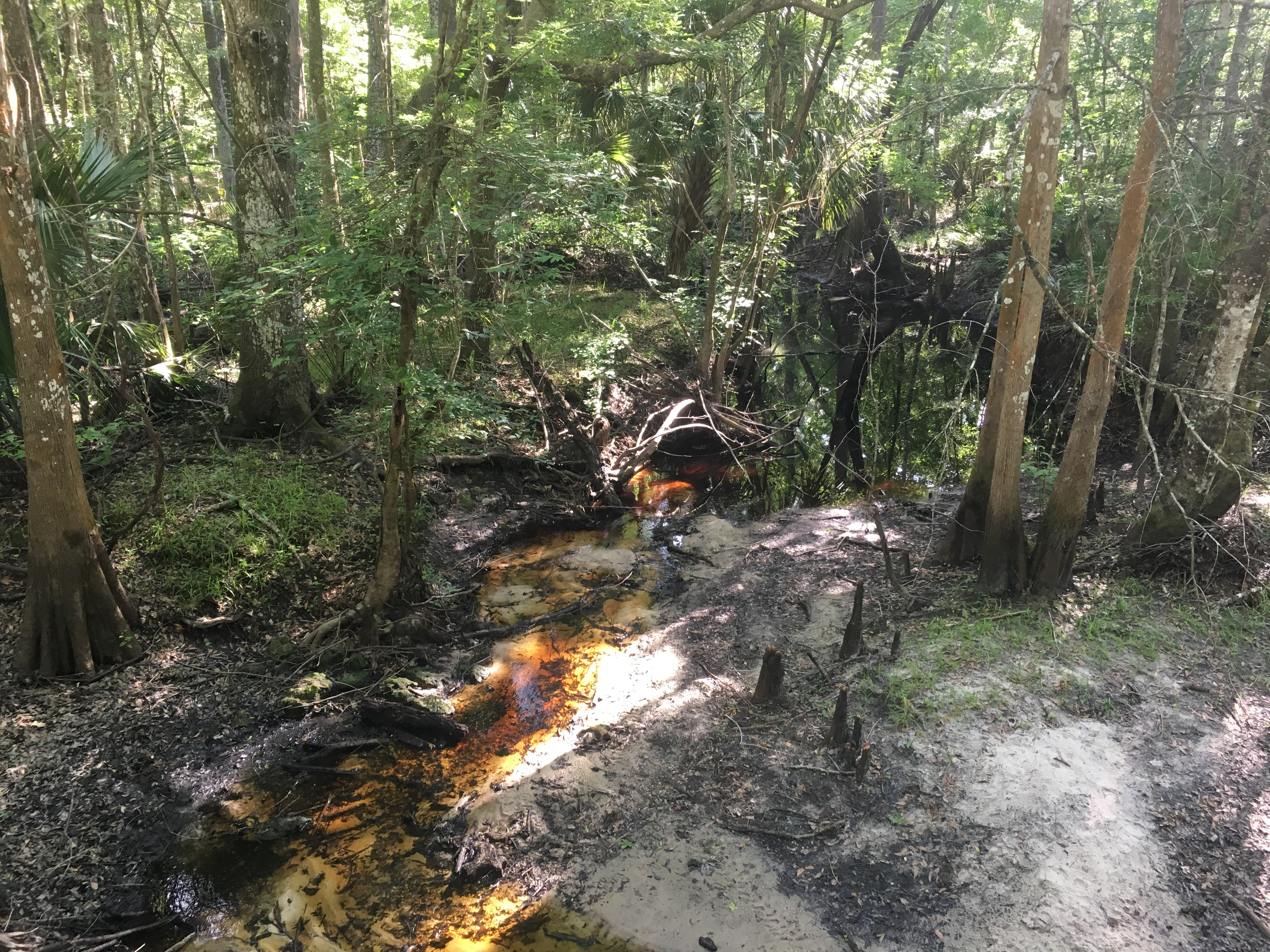
- Lochloosa Creek, April 2019

Location
- Country: United States
- State: Florida
- County: Alachua County

Physical characteristics
- Source
  - location: Saluda Swamp
  - coordinates: 29°39′56″N 82°09′35″W
- Mouth
  - location: Lochloosa Lake
  - coordinates: 29°32′54″N 82°08′16″W
  - elevation: 56 ft (17 m)
- Basin size: 42.7 mi^{2} (111 km^{2})

Basin features
- GNIS: 285900

Lochloosa Creek is a stream that flows from north to south through eastern Alachua County, Florida. Its watershed composed of 42.7 square miles (111 km^{2}) through natural and Silvicultural land use. It is the largest tributary to Lochloosa Lake. Lochloosa Creek is longest creek in Alachua County.

== Headwaters ==
Forming from the Saluda Swamp, Lochloosa Creek begins as a small trickle of a stream that flows south. It flows through agricultural lands.
