= Orange Lake (Florida) =

Lake in Florida, United States of America

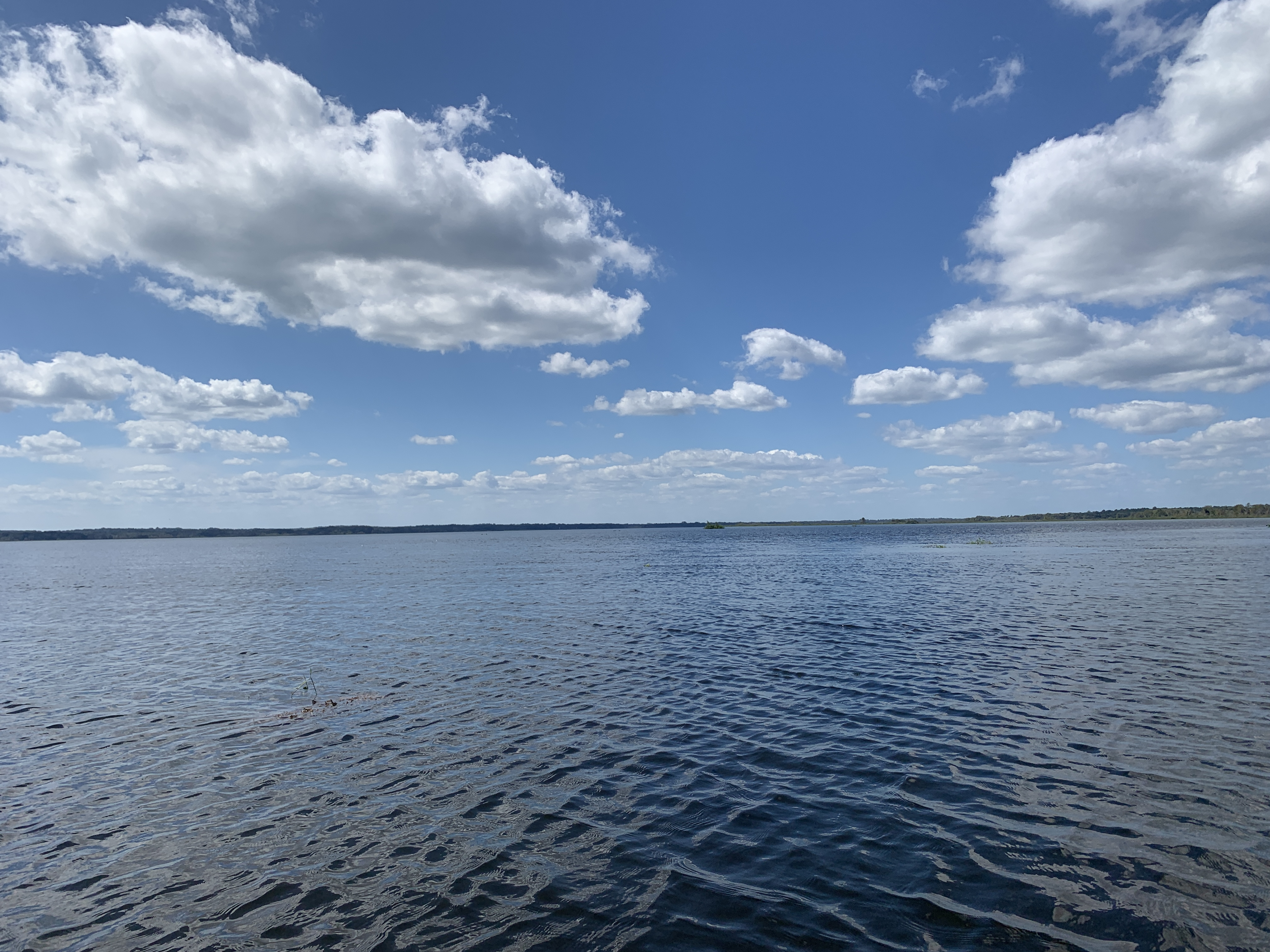

- Location within Florida
- Location: Alachua County, Florida
- Coordinates: 29°27′54″N 82°10′39″W
- Type: lake
- Surface area: 12,550 acres (5,080 ha)

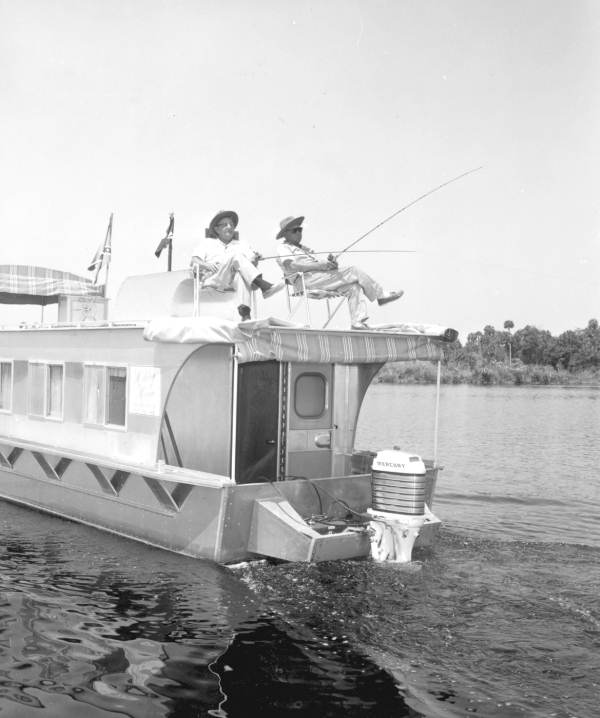
Two men bass fishing from atop a boat, Orange Lake, 1959

Orange Lake is in Alachua County, Florida, about 10 miles (16 km) south of Hawthorne. It has an area of about 12,550 acres (5,080 ha), and is part of the Orange Creek Basin, which is in turn part of the Oklawaha River watershed. Cross Creek flows into it from Lochloosa Lake, and Orange Creek drains it into the Rodman Reservoir. Orange Lake also receives water from Newnans Lake that has been diverted from its historic destination of Paynes Prairie. Orange Lake is noted for fishing, especially bass, with many fishing camps on its shores. The lake also has many natural floating islands, which have an "unusually high diversity", especially of amphibians.

The Timucua village of Potano was located along the western shore of Orange Lake in 1539, when it was visited by the Hernando de Soto expedition. The town of Potano was moved to a site northwest of present-day Gainesville, Florida in 1584 after being burned by the Spanish. The Spanish Mission of San Buenaventura de Potano was established at the old site of the town by or before 1608. Remains of the town and the foundation of the mission church were discovered at the Richardson Site, 8AL100, in 2013.

The lake was named for its location in a citrus-growing district.

Orange Lake Overlook Preserve is in the area.
