= Welaka, Florida =

Town in the state of Florida, United States

- Town
- Town of Welaka
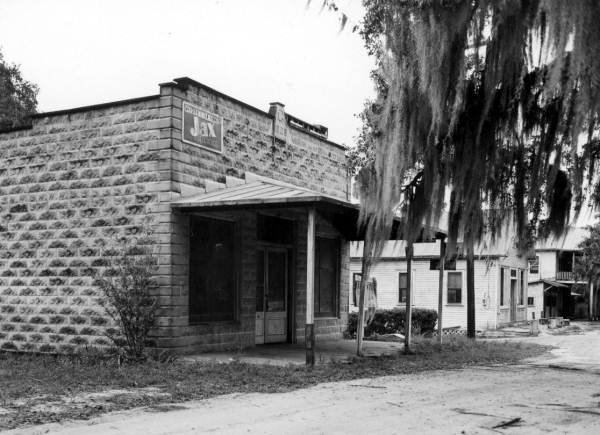
- Brick building along the commercial strip, November 1946

- Seal
- Mottoes: "Bass Capital of the World" "River of Lakes"
- Location in Putnam County and the state of Florida
- Coordinates: 29°28′56″N 81°39′57″W
- Country: United States
- State: Florida
- County: Putnam
- Settled (Mt. Tucker): July 6, 1852
- Incorporated (Town of Welaka): June 21, 1887

Government
  - Type: Mayor-Council
  - Mayor: Kathy Washington
  - Council President: Tonya F. Long
  - Council Members: Kenneth Pagano; Sandra Walker and David Jeltes
  - Town Clerk: Meghan E. Allmon
  - Town Attorney: Patrick Kennedy

Area
  - Total: 1.51 sq mi (3.91 km^{2})
  - Land: 1.47 sq mi (3.82 km^{2})
  - Water: 0.035 sq mi (0.09 km^{2})
- Elevation: 30 ft (9.1 m)

Population (2020)
  - Total: 714
  - Density: 484.4/sq mi (187.03/km^{2})
- Time zone: UTC-5 (Eastern (EST))
  - Summer (DST): UTC-4 (EDT)
- ZIP code: 32193
- Area code: 386
- FIPS code: 12-75750
- GNIS feature ID: 2406853
- Website: www.welaka-fl.gov

Welaka is a town situated on the St. Johns River in Putnam County, Florida, United States. The town is part of the Palatka, Florida Micropolitan Statistical Area. The population was 714 as of the 2020 census, up from 701 at the 2010 census.

== History ==
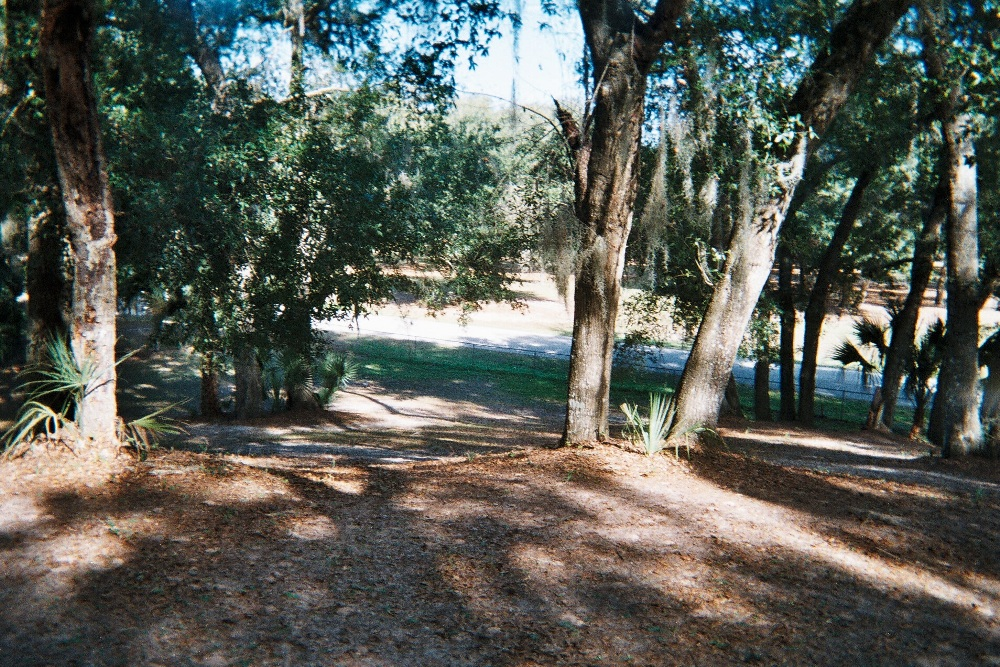
Mount Royal

It is not known when the area was first settled, but the nearby Mount Royal archaeological site is a possible remnant of a Timucua tribal village from c. 1250 CE to 1500 CE, and may have a connection to the town of Enacape, an important center of the Utina tribe.

The settlement was originally a 500-acre tract purchased by James William Bryant on July 6, 1852, and was known as "Mt. Tucker". Prior to the war, there were large orange groves and cotton plantations. In 1860, Welaka's population was slightly over 100. At the end of the Civil War, fewer than 20 remained. The community grew again, voted to become a municipality on April 23, 1887, and was officially incorporated on June 21, 1887, and was named the "Town of Welaka"; the name Welaka is said to have been derived from the word local Native Americans used for the St. Johns River. By the 1880s, Welaka had become a resort town, marketing itself to visitors seeking medicinal cures from the mineral water of the local springs. The Welaka Mineral Water Company was incorporated in 1907.

== Geography ==
Welaka is approximately 90 miles south of Jacksonville and is accessible by highway or the Atlantic Ocean via the St. Johns River.

According to the United States Census Bureau, the town has a total area of 1.4 square miles (3.6 km^{2}), of which 1.4 square miles (3.6 km^{2}) is land and 0.04 square miles (0.10 km^{2}) (2.86%) is water.

=== Climate ===
The climate in this area is characterized by hot, humid summers and generally mild winters. According to the Köppen climate classification, the Town of Welaka has a humid subtropical climate zone (Cfa).

== Demographics ==
Historical population
Census	Pop.	Note	%±
1900	215		—
1910	294		36.7%
1920	350		19.0%
1930	409		16.9%
1940	457		11.7%
1950	459		0.4%
1960	526		14.6%
1970	496		−5.7%
1980	492		−0.8%
1990	533		8.3%
2000	586		9.9%
2010	701		19.6%
2020	714		1.9%
U.S. Decennial Census

=== 2010 and 2020 census ===
Welaka racial composition (Hispanics excluded from racial categories) (NH = Non-Hispanic)
Race	Pop 2010	Pop 2020	% 2010	% 2020
White (NH)	508	497	72.47%	69.61%
Black or African American (NH)	159	123	22.68%	17.23%
Native American or Alaska Native (NH)	1	2	0.14%	0.28%
Asian (NH)	2	2	0.29%	0.28%
Pacific Islander or Native Hawaiian (NH)	0	0	0.00%	0.00%
Some other race (NH)	0	3	0.00%	0.42%
Two or more races/Multiracial (NH)	7	33	1.00%	4.62%
Hispanic or Latino (any race)	24	54	3.42%	7.56%
Total	701	714	100.00%	100.00%

As of the 2020 United States census, there were 714 people, 501 households, and 160 families residing in the town.

As of the 2010 United States census, there were 701 people, 227 households, and 149 families residing in the town.

=== 2000 census ===
As of the census of 2000, there were 586 people, 276 households, and 173 families residing in the town. The population density was 431.4 inhabitants per square mile (166.6/km^{2}). There were 368 housing units at an average density of 270.9 per square mile (104.6/km^{2}). The racial makeup of the town was 67.06% White, 28.84% African American, 0.34% Native American, 0.17% Pacific Islander, 2.22% from other races, and 1.37% from two or more races. Hispanic or Latino of any race were 3.41% of the population.

In 2000, there were 276 households, out of which 16.7% had children under the age of 18 living with them, 47.5% were married couples living together, 12.7% had a female householder with no husband present, and 37.3% were non-families. 31.9% of all households were made up of individuals, and 17.8% had someone living alone who was 65 years of age or older. The average household size was 2.12 and the average family size was 2.63.

In 2000, in the town, the population was spread out, with 17.2% under the age of 18, 5.5% from 18 to 24, 19.6% from 25 to 44, 30.2% from 45 to 64, and 27.5% who were 65 years of age or older. The median age was 52 years. For every 100 females, there were 86.6 males. For every 100 females age 18 and over, there were 84.4 males.

In 2000, the median income for a household in the town was $25,069, and the median income for a family was $30,938. Males had a median income of $29,583 versus $20,938 for females. The per capita income for the town was $14,495. About 15.8% of families and 25.0% of the population were below the poverty line, including 38.2% of those under age 18 and 11.1% of those age 65 or over.

== Government ==
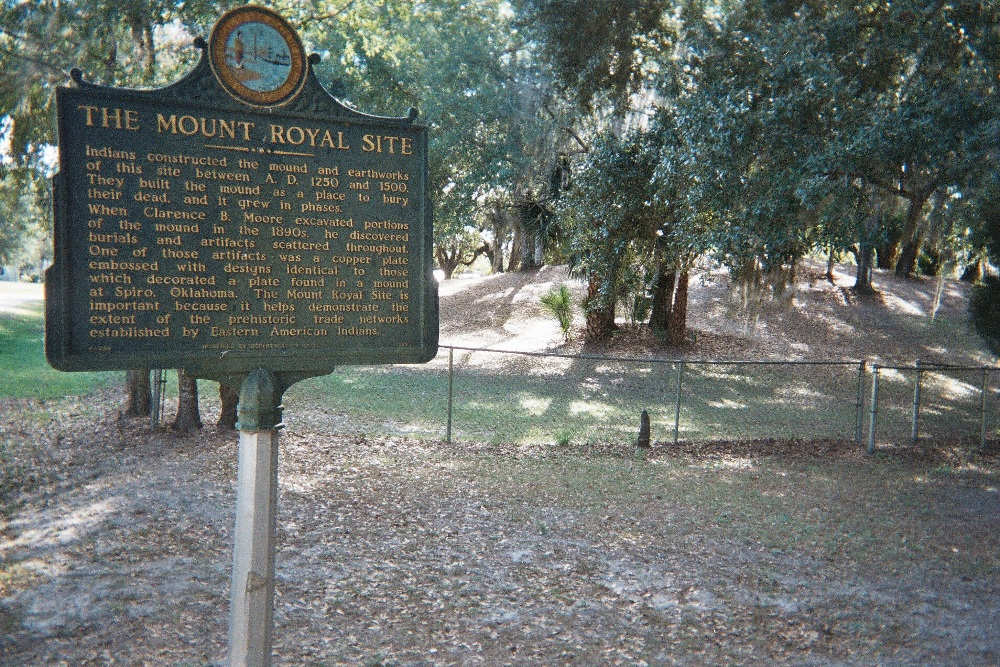
Historic marker for Mount Royal

Welaka has a strong mayor–council form of government, but the mayor has no veto power over council decisions. The mayor serves as chair of council meetings, as the ceremonial head of town and has broad administrative powers.

Elections are held every year in March. Two council members are elected in even-number years, and the mayor and two town council members are elected in odd-numbered years.

Upon the swearing-in of a new council, the first action is selecting a council president from among the four council members. The council president serves in the event of the resignation or other reason that the mayor cannot.

== Points of interest ==
- Welaka National Fish Hatchery
- Mount Royal
- Welaka State Forest
