= Santos Trail System =

Coordinates: 29.1053°N 82.0955°W

Santos Trail System is a network of hiking, equestrian and mountain bike trails outside of Ocala, Florida. The trails are maintained by the Ocala Mountain Biking Association (OMBA). The trail system is designated at the Bronze Level by International Mountain Bicycling Association (IMBA Ride Center).

The trail system is on land that is part of the Cross Florida Greenway. Volunteers began trail development on the property in 1993. There are more than 85 miles (136.79 km) of trails with widely varying difficulty in the system. In March the OMBA hosts a Spring Break Fat Tire Festival that includes three days and two nights of music, food, riding and socializing. Other events include The Take a Kid Mountain Biking Day.

Mountain bike trails include:

- Ant HIll
- Bunny
- Canopy
- Cowbone
- Dogbone
- Dr. Ruth
- Ern n' Burn
- John Brown
- Nayls Trail
- Rattle Snake
- Sinkhole
- Speedway
- Twister
- Vortex Red
