= St. Johns-Indian River Barge Canal =

Cancelled canal project in Florida, United States

Specifications
- Locks: 2
- Maximum height AMSL: 15 ft (4.6 m)
- Status: Cancelled
- Navigation authority: Canal Authority of Florida

History
- Principal engineer: Reynolds, Smith and Hills

Geography
- Start point: North end Indian River

The St. Johns-Indian River Barge Canal was a planned canal in the state of Florida, 35.2 miles (56.6 km) in length and linking the Intracoastal Waterway and the Indian River 5 miles (8.0 km) south of Oak Hill with the St. Johns River, originally intended to be just south of Lake Harney, but later shifted to be near Lake Monroe, with all but three miles of the route within Volusia County. However, by 1968 the more southerly Lake Harney alignment had returned to favor.

Originally proposed in the 1850s, then again in 1909 and in the late 1930s, the St. Johns-Indian River Canal Authority was established in 1960. The canal would have been 125 feet (38 m) wide and 8 feet (2.4 m) deep, with three high-level and one bascule highway bridges, two bascule railroad bridges, two locks measuring 56 feet (17 m) by 250 feet (76 m), two navigation dams 56 feet (17 m) wide, and a pumping station.

Combined with the Cross Florida Barge Canal, the canal would have provided a shipping route across the Florida peninsula between the Atlantic Ocean and the Gulf of Mexico; construction was planned to begin in 1968, with the canal to open in 1971, however construction never began as delays to the Cross Florida Barge Canal project mounted, with the projected groundbreaking pushed back first to 1970, then further, with conservation issues dogging the project especially with regard to spawning shad.

After the suspension of work on the Cross Florida Barge Canal, the St. Johns-Indian River canal concept was abandoned, and the Canal Authority was dissolved in 1973.
