= Lake Alice (Gainesville, Florida) =

Lake on the University of Florida campus in Gainesville, Florida

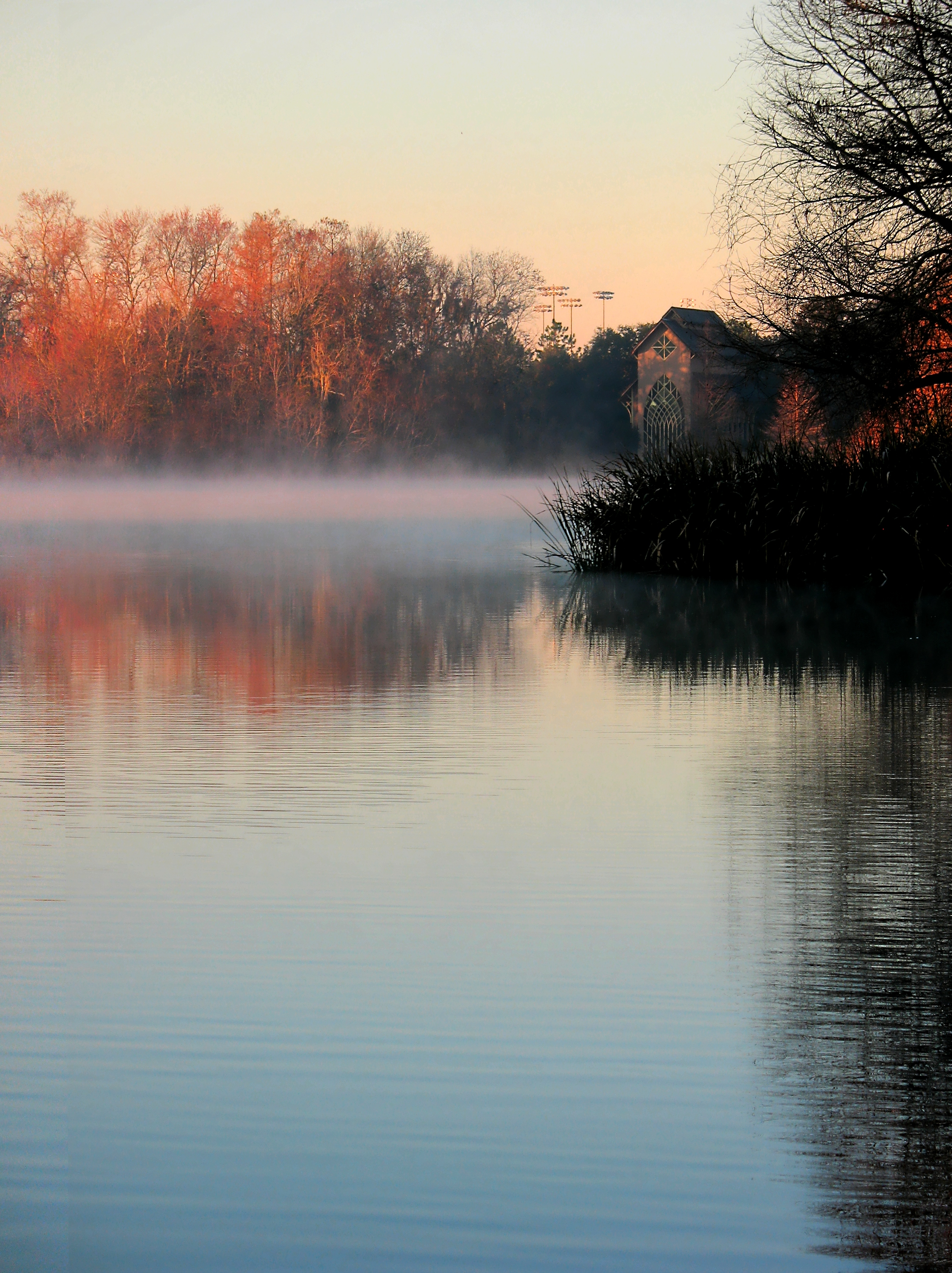

- Location within Florida Location within the United States
- Location: Gainesville, Florida
- Coordinates: 29°38.5′N 82°21.4′W
- Basin countries: United States
- Surface elevation: 66 feet (20 m)

Lake Alice is a small lake on the University of Florida campus in Gainesville, Florida, United States.

The lake is a wildlife area and is one of the few areas in incorporated Gainesville where one may view live alligators. The lake also harbors a population of Florida softshell turtles. The university's bat house is near the lake. The Baughman Center sits on the southwest bank of the lake. On Lake Alice's northern side, there is a boardwalk that leads visitors through the woods and swamp to a viewing platform.

The people of the Alachua culture who built a burial mound near the College of Law on University of Florida’s campus (the "Law School Mound") c 1000 AD are believed to have lived along the shore of Lake Alice.

How Lake Alice obtained its name is uncertain. Prior to the 1890s, Lake Alice was known as "Jonah's Pond" but by 1894, US Geological Surveys noted it as Lake Alice. A Master's thesis written in 1953 makes the unreferenced claim that it was named for the only daughter of a Mr. Witt, who owned a farm of which the lake was a part.

In the late 1960s, the University of Florida administration and the Florida Department of Transportation planned to drain portions of the lake and construct a cross-campus throughway and 2,000-car parking lot along its shore. Environmental activist Marjorie Harris Carr, along with University of Florida professors John Kaufmann and Joe Little, led a successful opposition movement that eventually defeated the plan.

In 1988 the University of Florida administration sought to develop the shoreline of Lake Alice with luxury student housing, eliminating the student gardens as well as the bat house in the process. After eleven years of organized protest against the development and a petition opposing it signed by more than 8,000 students, faculty, and other citizens, the proposal was halted on December 8, 1998, when Lawton Chiles, in one of his last acts as governor before his unexpected death three days later, moved at a meeting of the Florida Cabinet to preserve the shoreline, and the motion passed unanimously.

In October 2017, an adult one-eyed alligator was photographed facing Museum Road near the shore.

Animals in or on the shore of Lake Alice
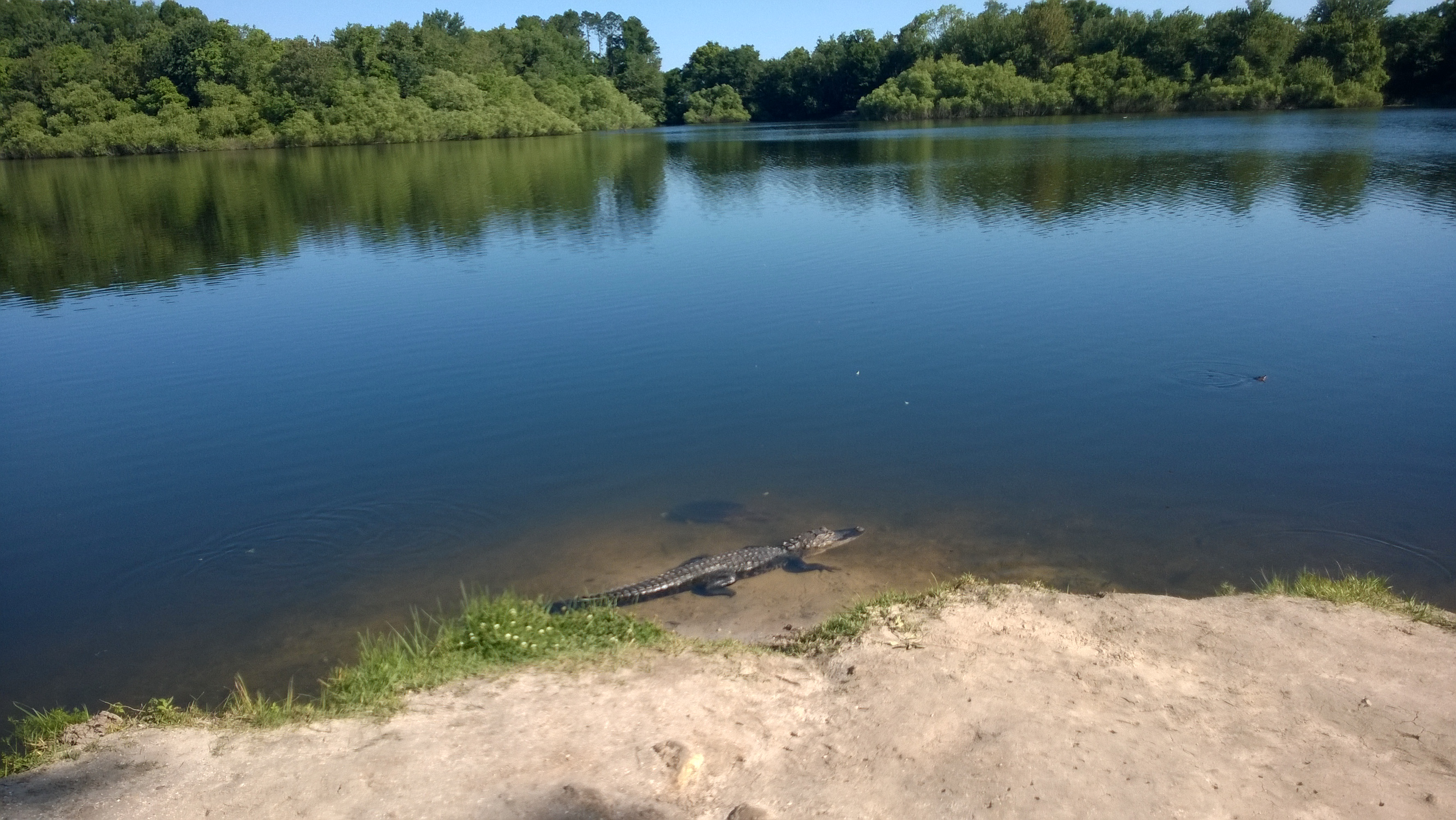

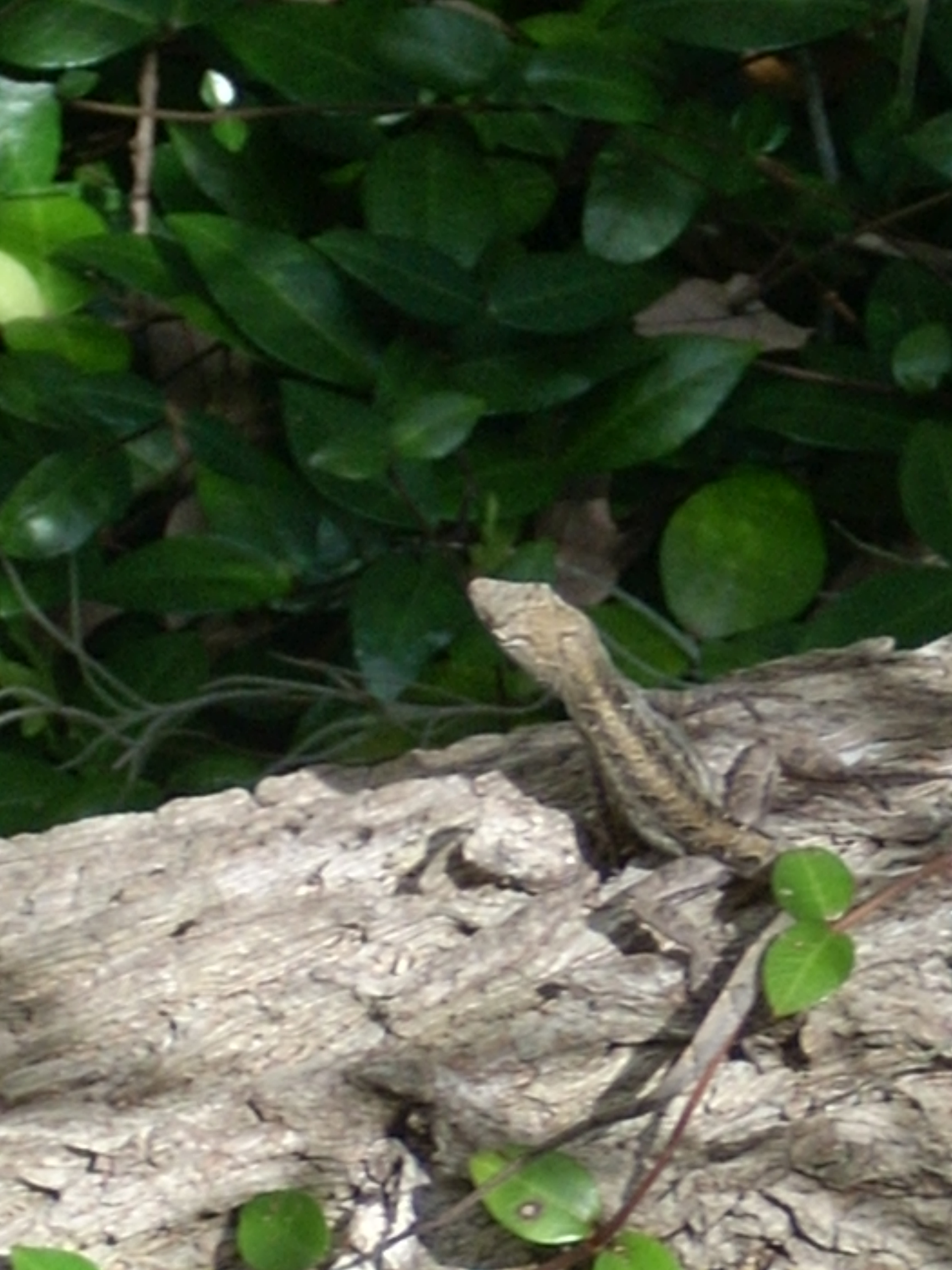

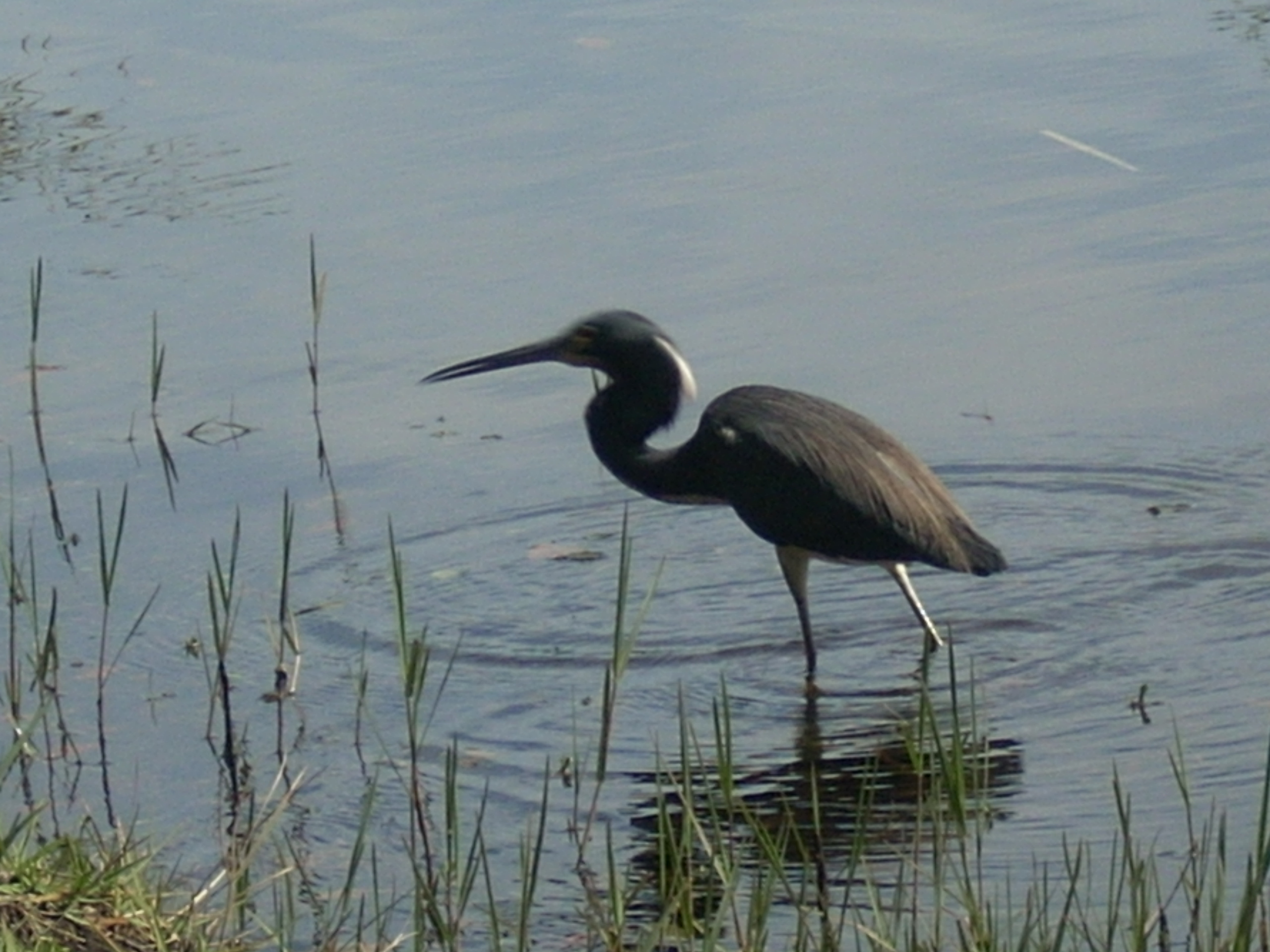

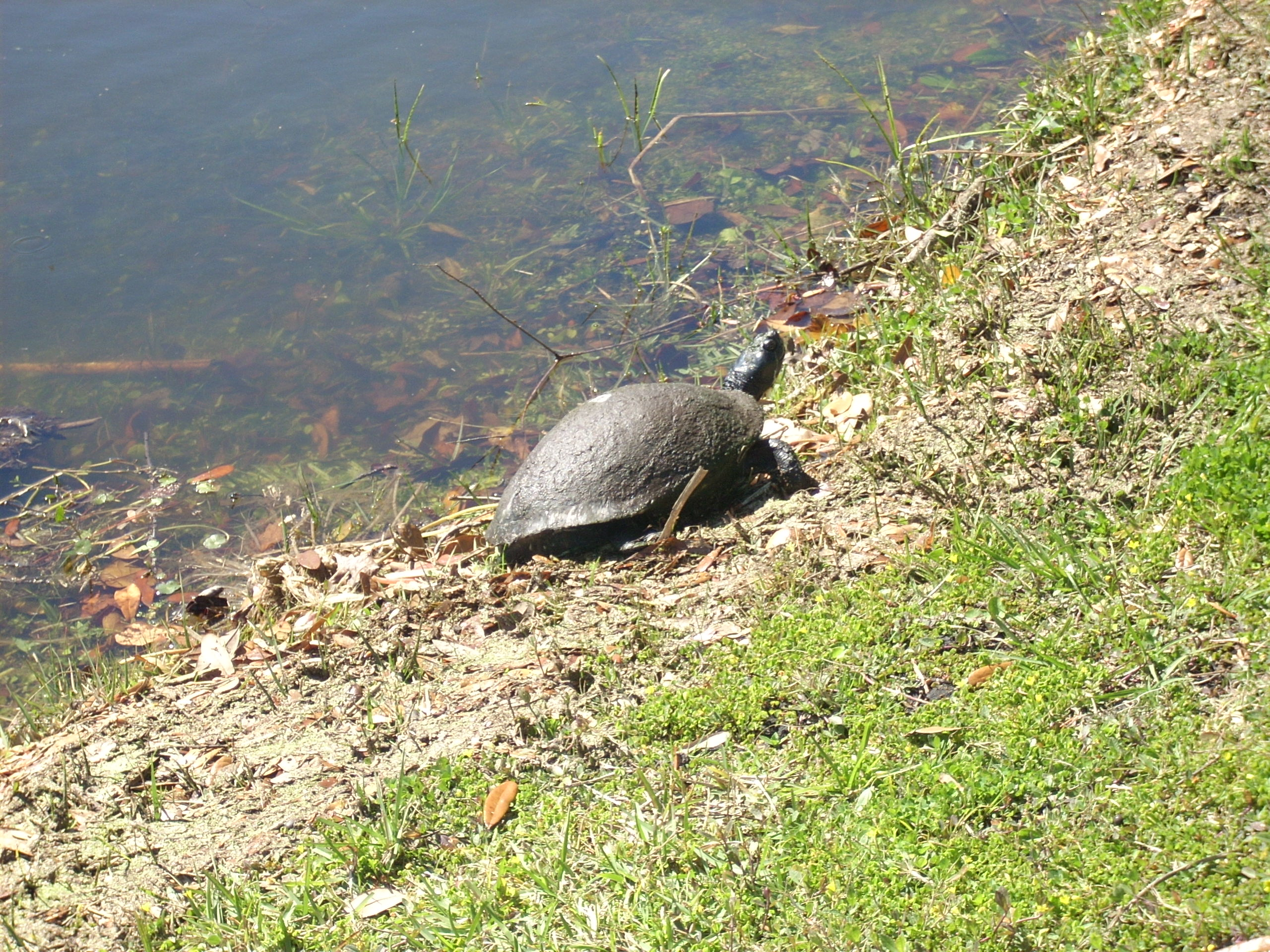
