= Mount Royal (Florida) =

Archaeological site in Florida, US

- U.S. National Register of Historic Places
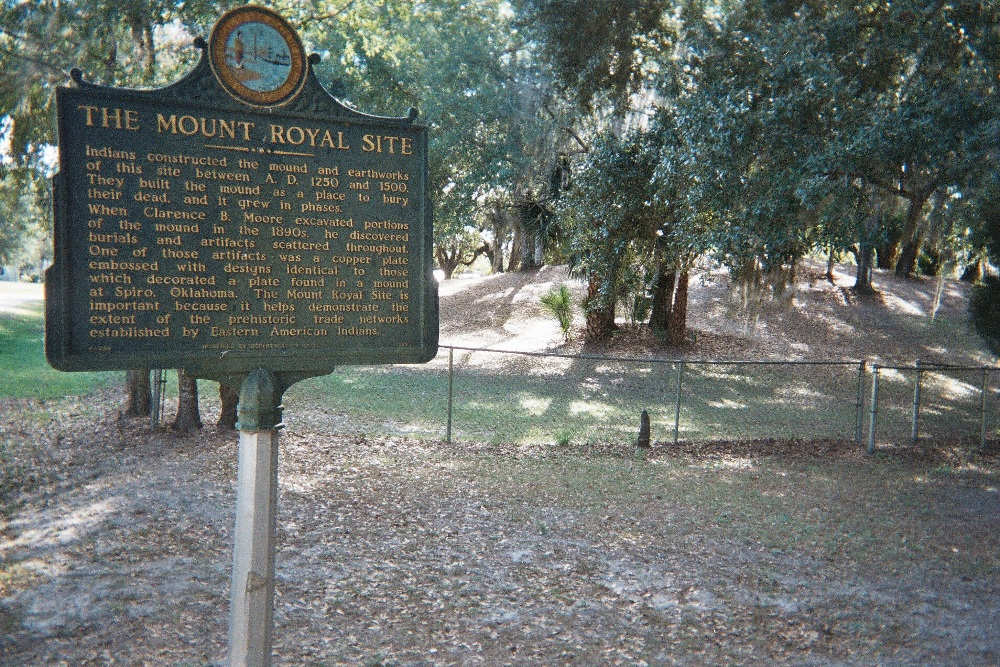
- Historical marker, with Mount Royal in the background

- Location within Florida Location within the United States
- Location: Putnam County, Florida, USA
- Nearest city: Welaka, Florida
- Coordinates: 29°26′11″N 81°39′37″W
- Area: < 1-acre (4,000 m^{2})
- Built: between 1250 and 1500 A.D.
- NRHP reference No.: 73000603
- Added to NRHP: May 7, 1973

Mount Royal (8PU35) is a U.S. archaeological site close to where the St. Johns River exits from Lake George in Putnam County, Florida. It is located three miles (5 km) south of Welaka, in the Mount Royal Airpark, off County Road 309 on the eastern bank of the St. Johns River. The site consists of a large sand mound and several nearby middens.

The Mount Royal site was occupied beginning about 4,000 years ago. The site was largely unoccupied from 500 BCE until 750 CE. Mount Royal was occupied again after 750, and after 1050 it grew into the main town of an important chiefdom with connections to the Mississippian culture. The town lost importance after 1300, but it was still there when Europeans first entered the area in the 1560s. At that time it was part of the Timucua chiefdoms of Utina and Agua Dulce. In 1616, Enacape became the administrative center of Agua Dulce, and the Spanish established the mission of San Antonio de Enacape. The town and mission remained until after 1656.

== Location ==
The Mount Royal site is located on the east side of the St. Johns River between Lake George, to the south, and Little Lake George. The site is on the north side of a short section of the river that flows to the west (the river in general flows northward). The most prominent feature is a large sand mound about 90 metres (300 ft) from the river. A causeway or avenue, still visible at the end of the 19th century, but since obscured, ran north from the mound to a rectangular pond. The mound is on a 1 acre (0.40 ha) parcel now owned by the State of Florida. The surrounding area, including the middens and village area, is part of the Mount Royal Airpark residential development.

== Archaeological investigation ==
=== The Bartrams ===
The Mount Royal site entered the archaeological record in 1766, when John Bartram and his son William visited it. William returned to the site 15 years later. They found a sand mound 100 yards (90 m) in diameter, and almost 20 feet (6 m) tall. The Bartrams described an "avenue" running north from the mound, with raised banks on the sides. The avenue was "level as a floor", 60 yards (50 m) wide, and extended about .75 miles (1.2 km) to a rectangular pond 100 yards (91.4 m) wide and 150 yards (137.2 m) long. John Bartram speculated the pond had been a borrow pit from which the sand in the mound had been taken.

On William's return to the site, he found that an orange grove and palms and live oaks that had flanked the avenue in 1766 had been cleared in preparation for planting. The 19th-century archaeologist Samuel Foster Haven called the reports published by the Bartrams "the earliest 'careful and intelligent' descriptions of a native American Indian mound."

=== Clarence Moore ===
In 1891, Clarence Bloomfield Moore, a self-trained archaeologist, investigated shell middens along the St. Johns River. In 1893, he returned to the St. Johns and began excavating sand mounds, including the one at Mount Royal. In two short seasons (two-and-a-half weeks in 1893 and three weeks in 1894), Moore excavated and backfilled almost all of the sand mound. He published his findings at Mount Royal in two parts in the Journal of the Academy of Natural Sciences of Philadelphia in 1894, a total of more than 250 pages.

Before Moore's first visit, the mound had been plowed over and the sides of the mound had slumped down, raising the ground level around the mound. As a result, Moore encountered problems with measuring the height of the mound. He estimated that the mound was 4.9 m high, and stated that it had been much higher originally. He reported that the mound was 168 metres (551 ft) in circumference. The connection of the avenue to the mound was no longer discernible. He reported that the avenue was 12 to 20 yards (11 to 18 m) wide, flanked by berms that were an average of 2.5 feet (0.76 m) high and 12 feet (3.7 m) wide.

=== Later investigations ===
In the early 1950s John Goggin and his students from the University of Florida collected potsherds and other artifacts from the ground surface of the middens and other areas surrounding the Mount Royal mound. By this time the avenue reported by the Bartrams and Moore was no longer visible from the ground, but did show up in aerial photos. With the area slated for residential development, B. Calvin Jones of the Florida Bureau of Archaeological Research conducted investigations in 1983, 1994 and 1995, including shovel tests and focused excavations of selected areas.

== The mound ==
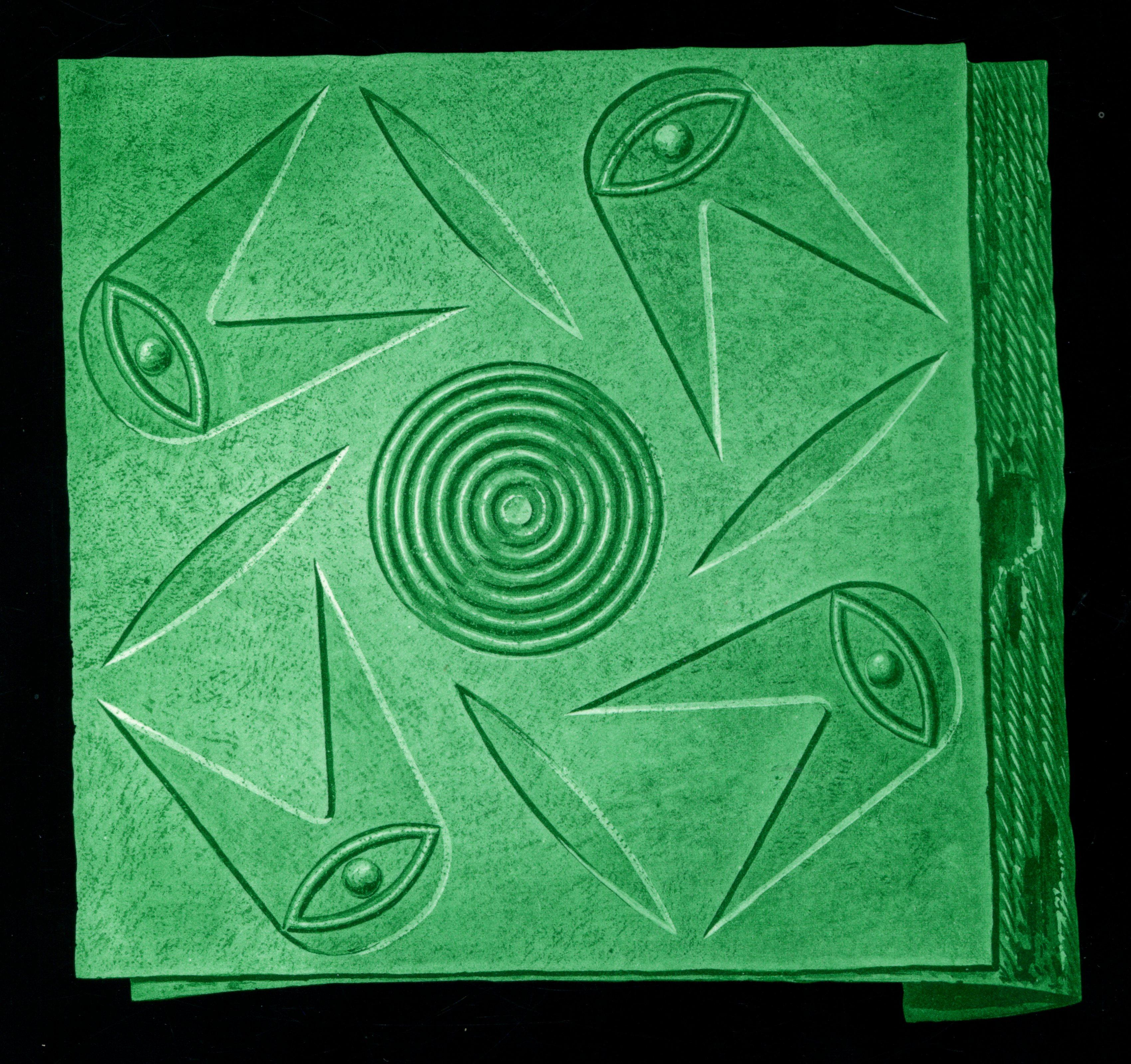
Copper plate, nearly 11 inches (280 mm) square, found in Mount Royal mound in Florida

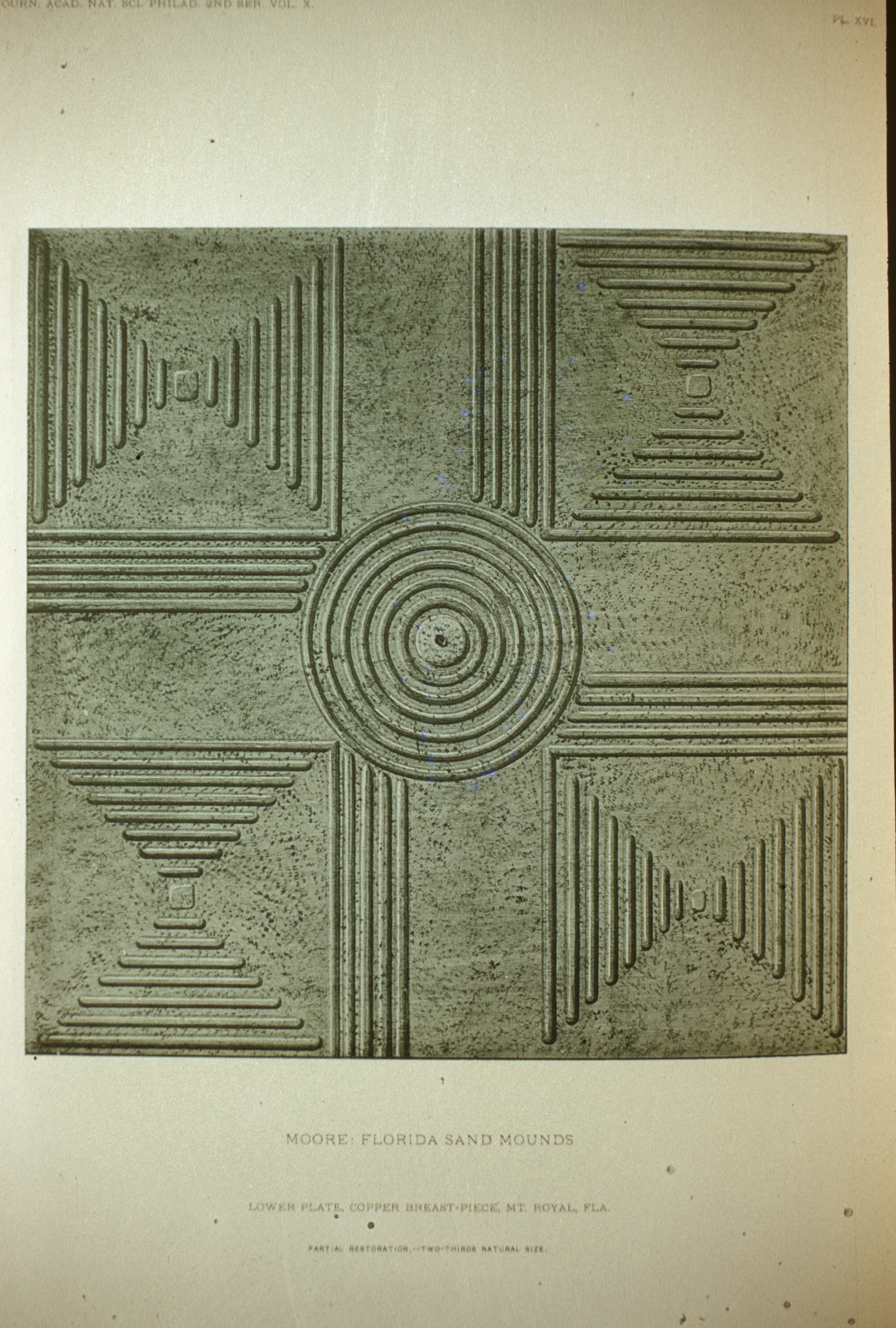
Copper plate, 10.5 inches (270 mm) square, from Mount Royal mound in Florida

Moore found charcoal mixed with the sand at the bottom of the mound. While not saying so explicitly for Mount Royal, Moore speculated in his reports on excavations of other sand mounds along the St. Johns River that fire was used in rituals at the beginning of mound construction. Other than some white sand at the base, the mound was constructed with yellow sand from the immediate vicinity. Sand that had been colored by the addition of hematite was found in layers in the mound. Artifacts were more common in the hematite-tinted sand layers than in untinted sand. The entire mound had been capped with hematite-colored sand, in a layer up to 2.1 metres (6.9 ft) deep in one section. Moore described the color of the hematite-tinted sand as "crushed strawberry", "brick red", and "Indian red".

Most of the artifacts found in the mound were in the top 2.1 metres (6.9 ft) of the mound. A few artifacts were found in the base of the mound, but the part of the mound from 0.3 to 2.7 metres (1.0 to 8.9 ft) above ground level was almost completely bare of artifacts. Burials were found throughout the mound, but the skeletons were always decayed, and in many cases only teeth were left.

== Early occupation ==
The first inhabitants of the Mount Royal site, who arrived around 2000 BCE, practiced the culture of the Orange period. Orange period people were hunter-gatherers, harvesting shellfish and fish from the rivers and coastal waters of northeastern Florida, gathering wild plants, and hunting. The Orange period began with the appearance of pottery in northeastern Florida, shortly after the appearance of pottery in coastal Georgia and South Carolina, the earliest in North America.

Around 500 BCE the Orange period developed into the St. Johns culture. During the first part of the St. Johns Culture, called St. Johns I, There were many sites occupied along the St. Johns River, but there is no evidence that the Mount Royal site was occupied during that period. Beginning around 750, as the St. Johns I transitioned into the St. Johns II period, people returned to occupy the Mount Royal site. Moore noted that St. Johns Check Stamped pottery, diagnostic of the St Johns II period, was present from the beginning of construction of the Mount Royal mound. While St. Johns people were probably already raising squashes and other plants in gardens, the cultivation of maize was likely introduced early in the St. Johns II period.

== Political complexity ==
After about 1050, chiefdoms developed among the people of the St. Johns culture. The chief of a larger village would exert political power over smaller villages in the area. Particular powerful chiefs would form confederations with other chiefdoms. The most powerful chiefdoms, wielding political and religious power, became ceremonial centers, with their status demonstrated by the construction of mounds. Mount Royal was such a ceremonial center for centuries, perhaps the largest over a wide area along the St. Johns River.

On May 7, 1973, Mount Royal was added to the U.S. National Register of Historic Places.

== Sources ==
- Ashley, Keith H. (September–December 2005). "Archaeological Overview of Mt. Royal". The Florida Anthropologist. 58 (3–4): 265–286 – via University of Florida Digital Collections.
- Milanich, Jerald T. (1994). Archaeology of Precolumbian Florida. Gainesville, Florida: University Press of Florida. ISBN 0-8130-1273-2.
- Milanich, Jerald T. (1999). Famous Florida Sites: Crystal River and Mount Royal. Gainesville, Florida: University Press of Florida. ISBN 978-0-8130-1694-8.
