= Cross Creek (Florida) =

Natural waterway in Florida, United States

Coordinates: 29°29′10″N 82°9′55″W

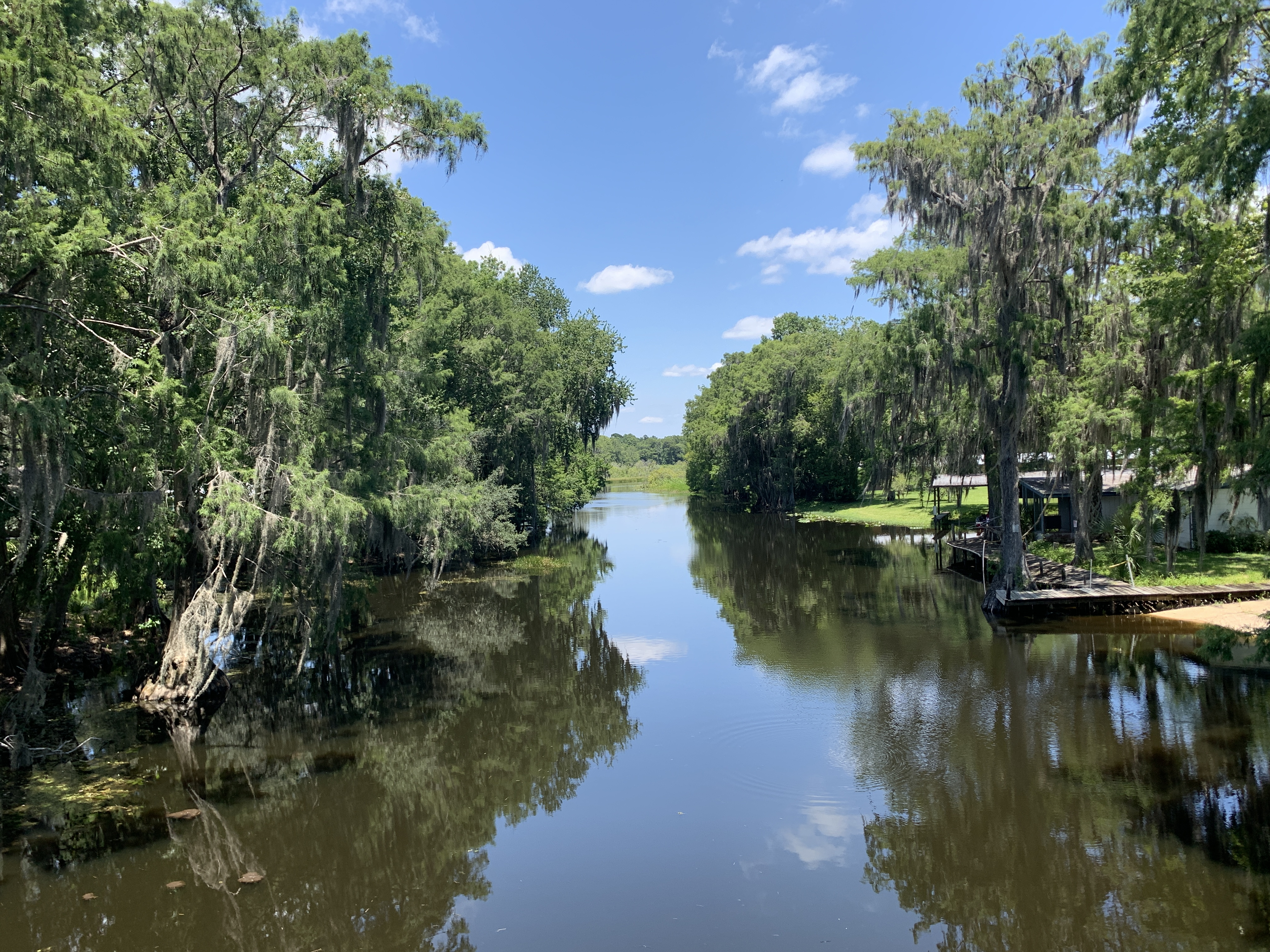
Cross Creek

Cross Creek is a natural waterway in Florida connecting Lochloosa Lake to Orange Lake, in southeastern Alachua County. It is 1.0 mile (1.6 km) long, and carries the outflow from Lochloosa Lake into Orange Lake. It is normally navigable by small boats, but has completely dried up in droughts. The creek has been designated an Outstanding Florida Water. County Road 325 crosses the creek. Cross Creek gives its name to the community of Cross Creek, which is famous as the home of Marjorie Kinnan Rawlings for the last 25 years of her life, and for being the subject of her memoir Cross Creek, which was made into a motion picture in 1983.
