= Welaka National Fish Hatchery =

Coordinates: 29.44154°N 81.64994°W

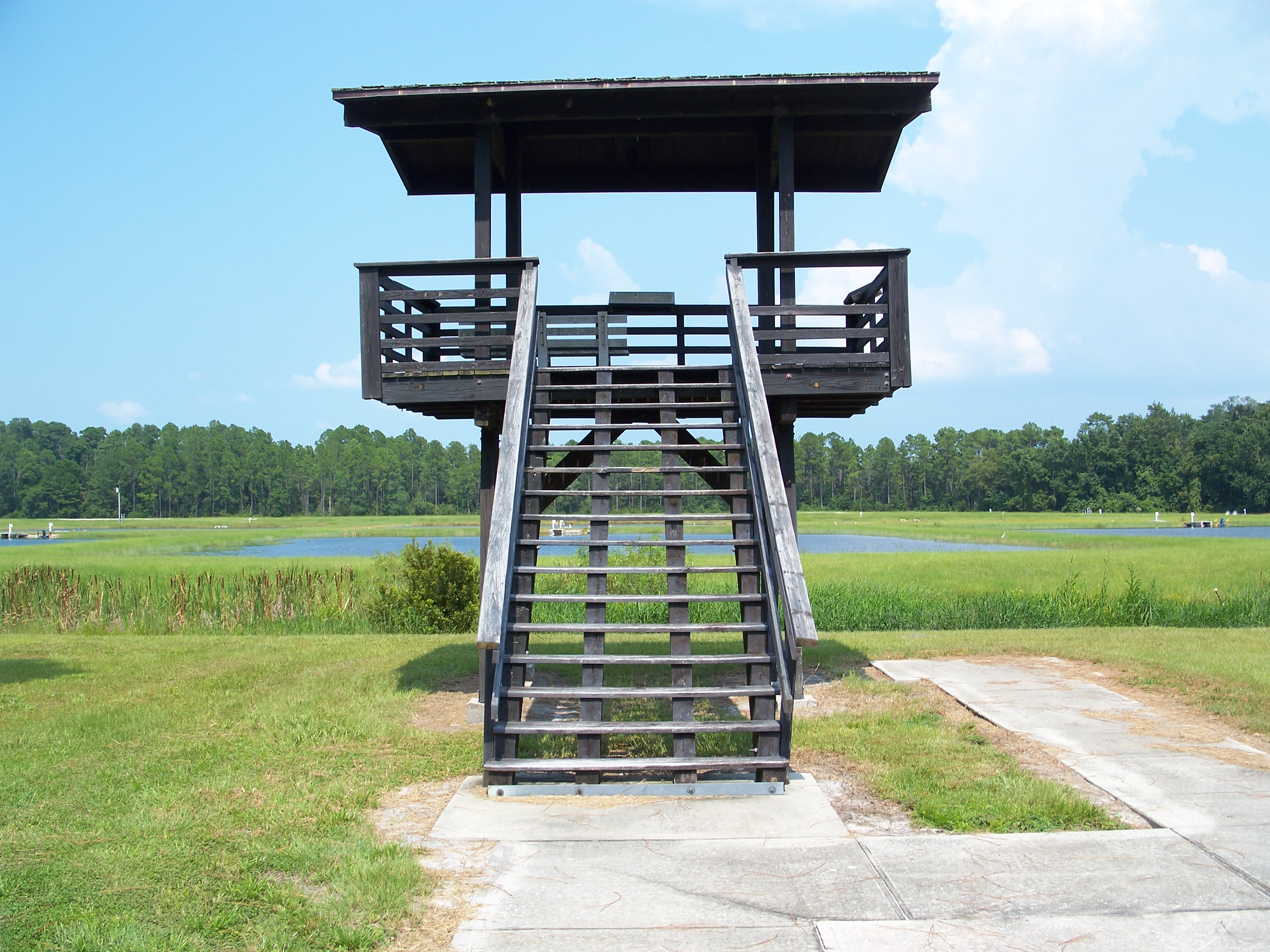
Observation tower at the Beecher Unit

The Welaka National Fish Hatchery, operated by the U.S. Fish and Wildlife Service, is a warmwater hatchery. The only national fish hatchery in Florida, it has two units, both of which are near the town of Welaka.

== History ==
The state of Florida built the hatchery in 1926, running it for over a decade. The facilities were turned over to the U.S. government in 1938, who have been in charge since then.

== The hatchery ==
The headquarters for the hatchery is called the Welaka Unit. A nearby aquarium is operated by the Unit, with samples of fish that the hatchery raises.

Approximately three miles to the south is the Beecher Unit, named after the spring that provides water for the fish ponds there. It has an observation tower with interpretive information, as well as a small picnic area and nature trail.

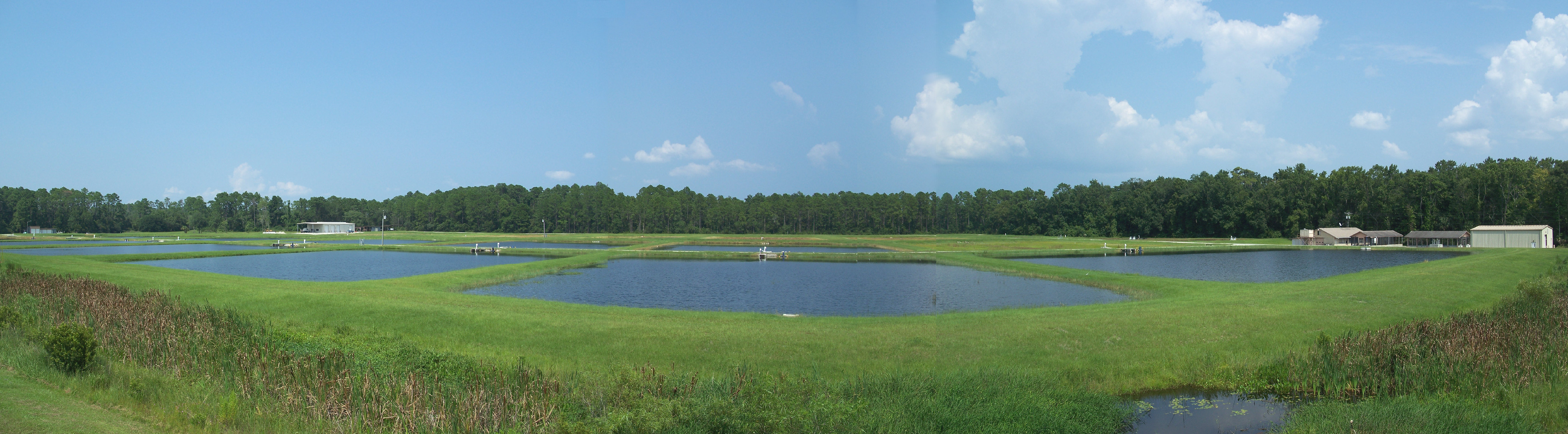
View of the Beecher Unit from the observation tower
