= Marjorie Harris Carr Cross Florida Greenway =

Canceled canal project in Florida

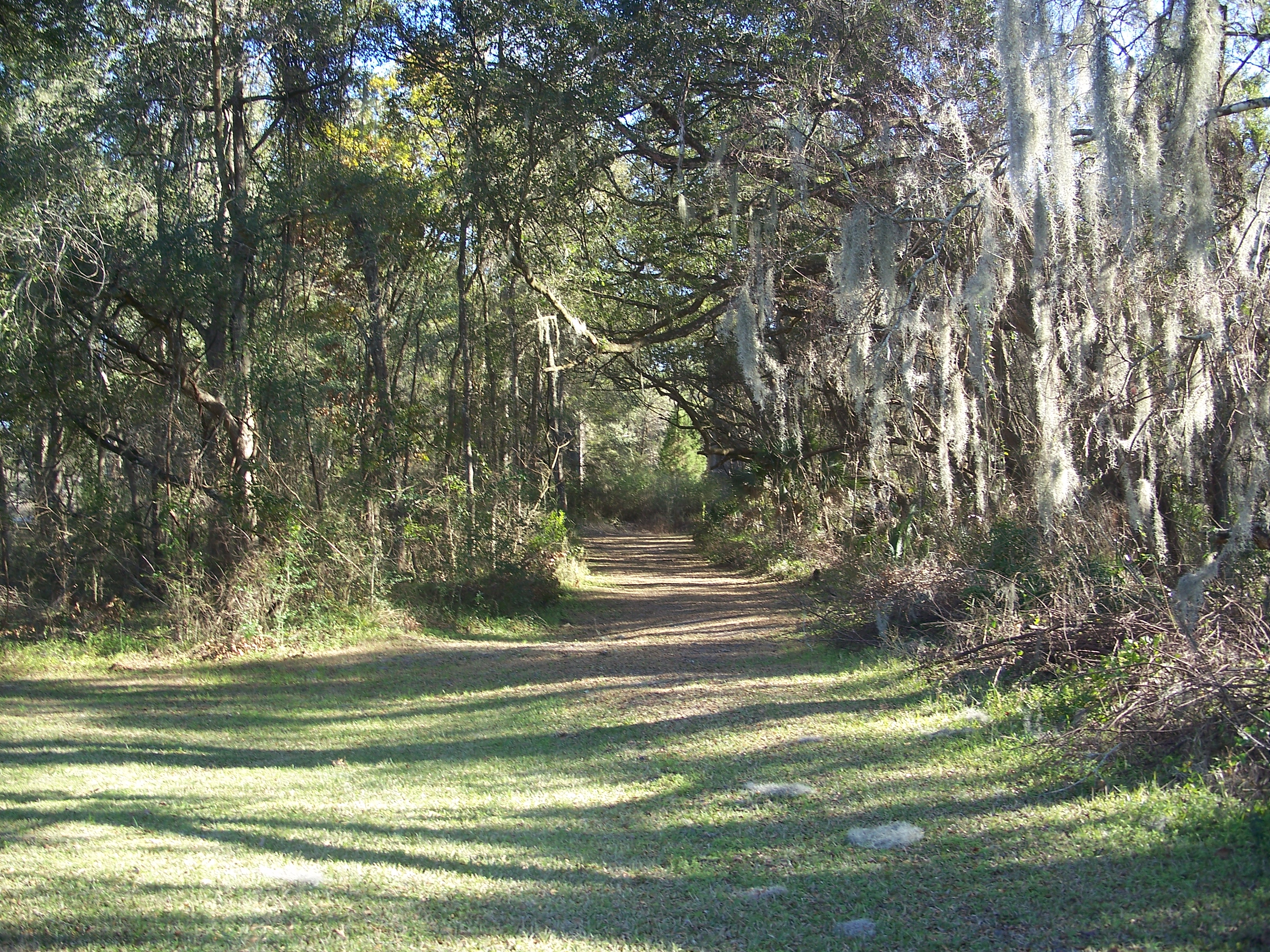
- Start of the Historic Ship Canal Trail, along the route of the unfinished Cross Florida Barge Canal

- Location within Florida Location within the United States
- Interactive map of Marjorie Harris Carr Cross Florida Greenway
- Location: Citrus, Levy, Marion, and Putnam counties, Florida, United States
- Nearest city: Ocala
- Coordinates: 29°11′06″N 82°00′59″W
- Length: 110 mi (180 km) in length
- Area: 70,640 acres (28,590 ha)
- Established: January 22, 1991; 35 years ago
- Named for: Marjorie Harris Carr (renamed 1998)
- Governing body: Florida Department of Environmental Protection
- Website: https://www.floridastateparks.org/Cross-Florida

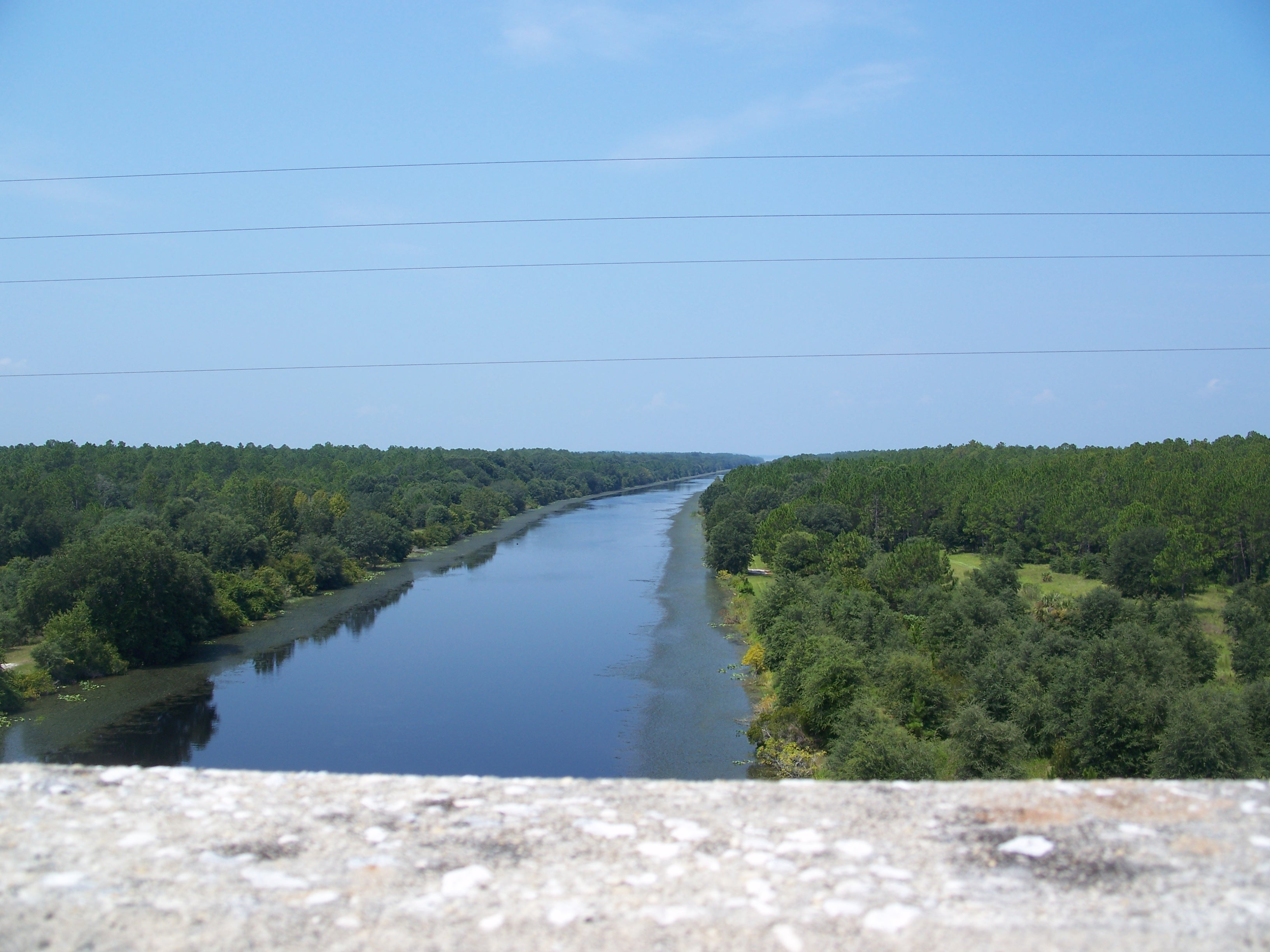
One of the two completed sections of the Barge Canal, looking west from the SR 19 bridge south of Palatka

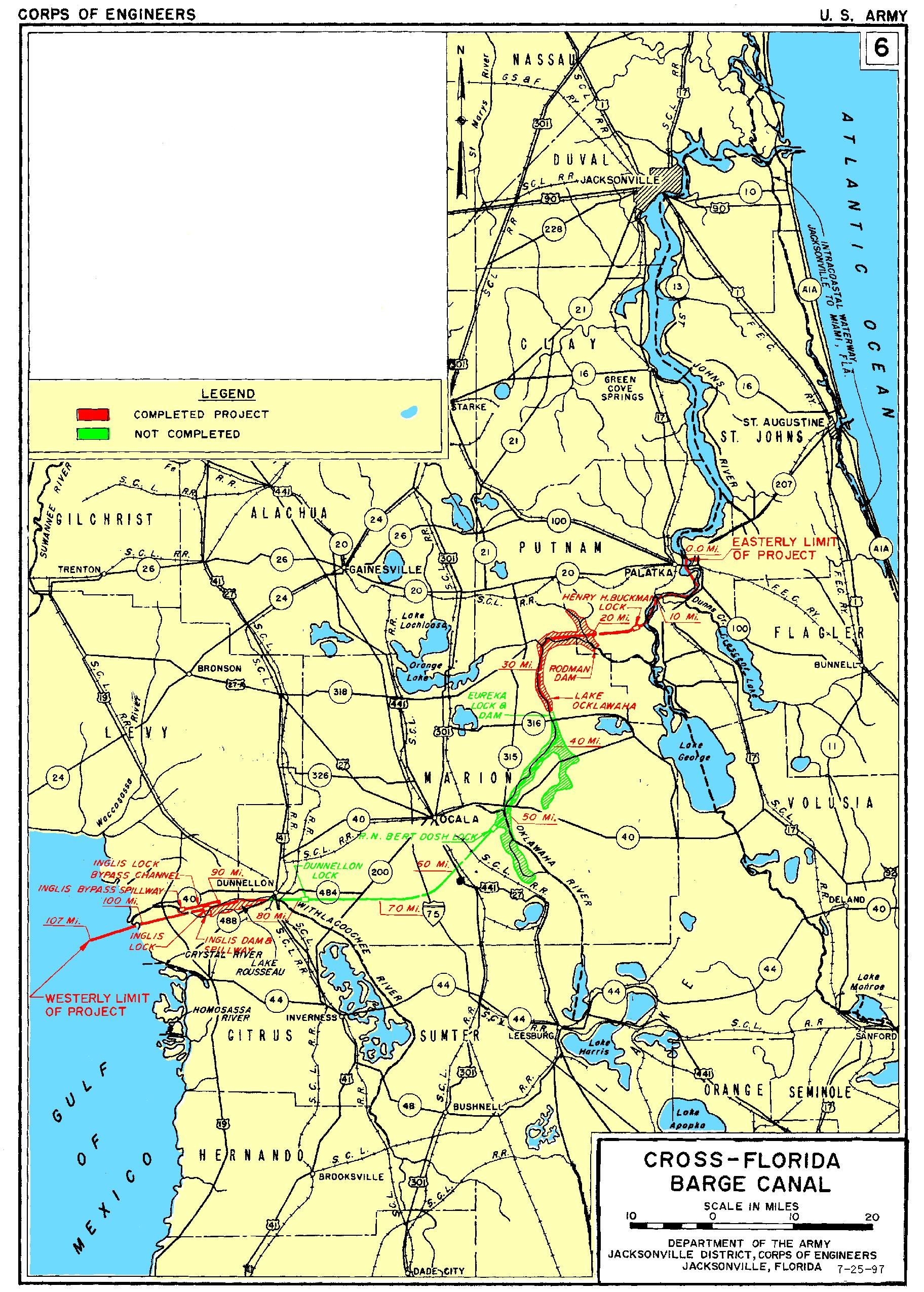
A map of the Cross Florida Barge Canal as planned and built

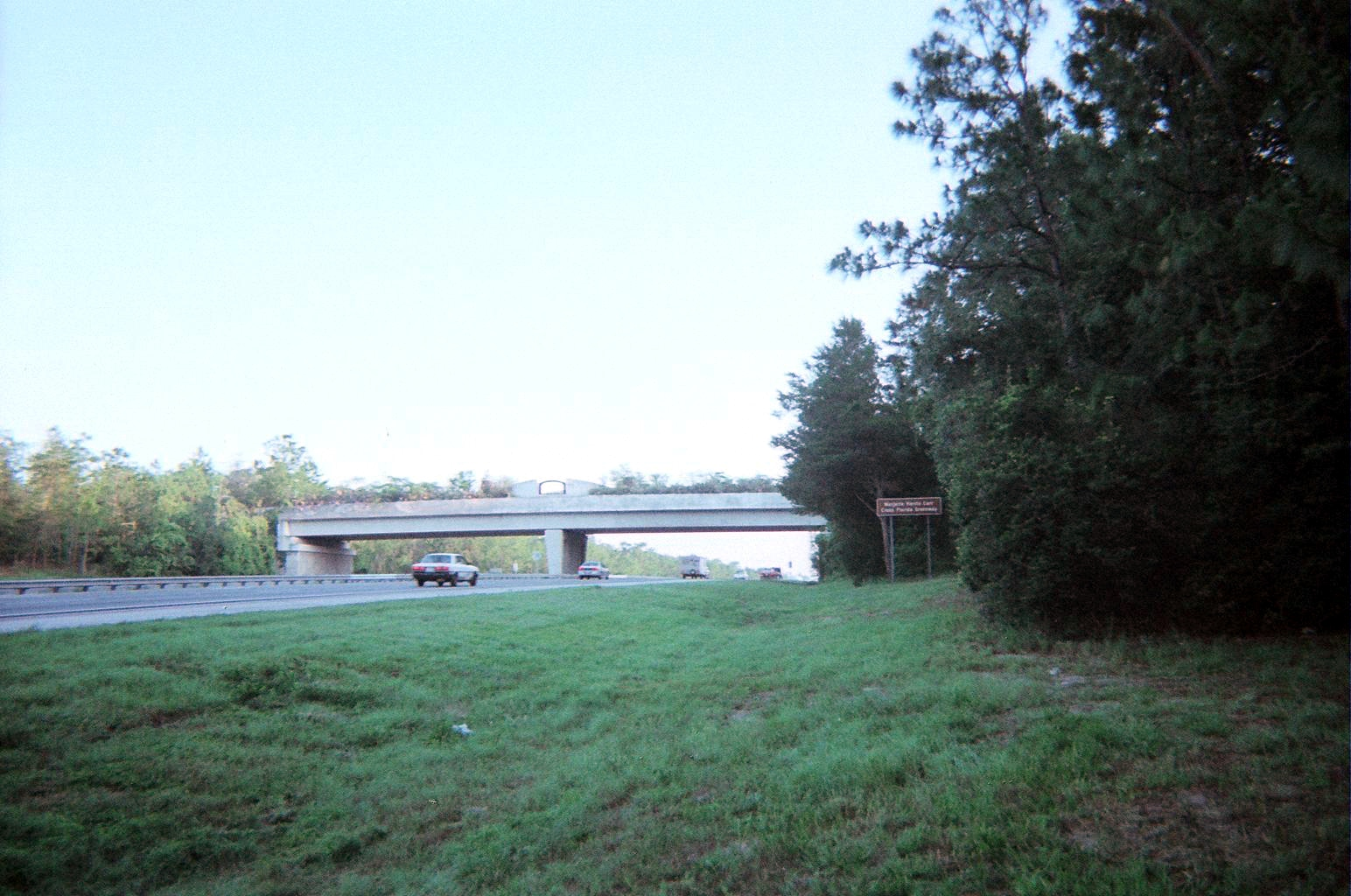
The Cross Florida Greenway bridge over I-75

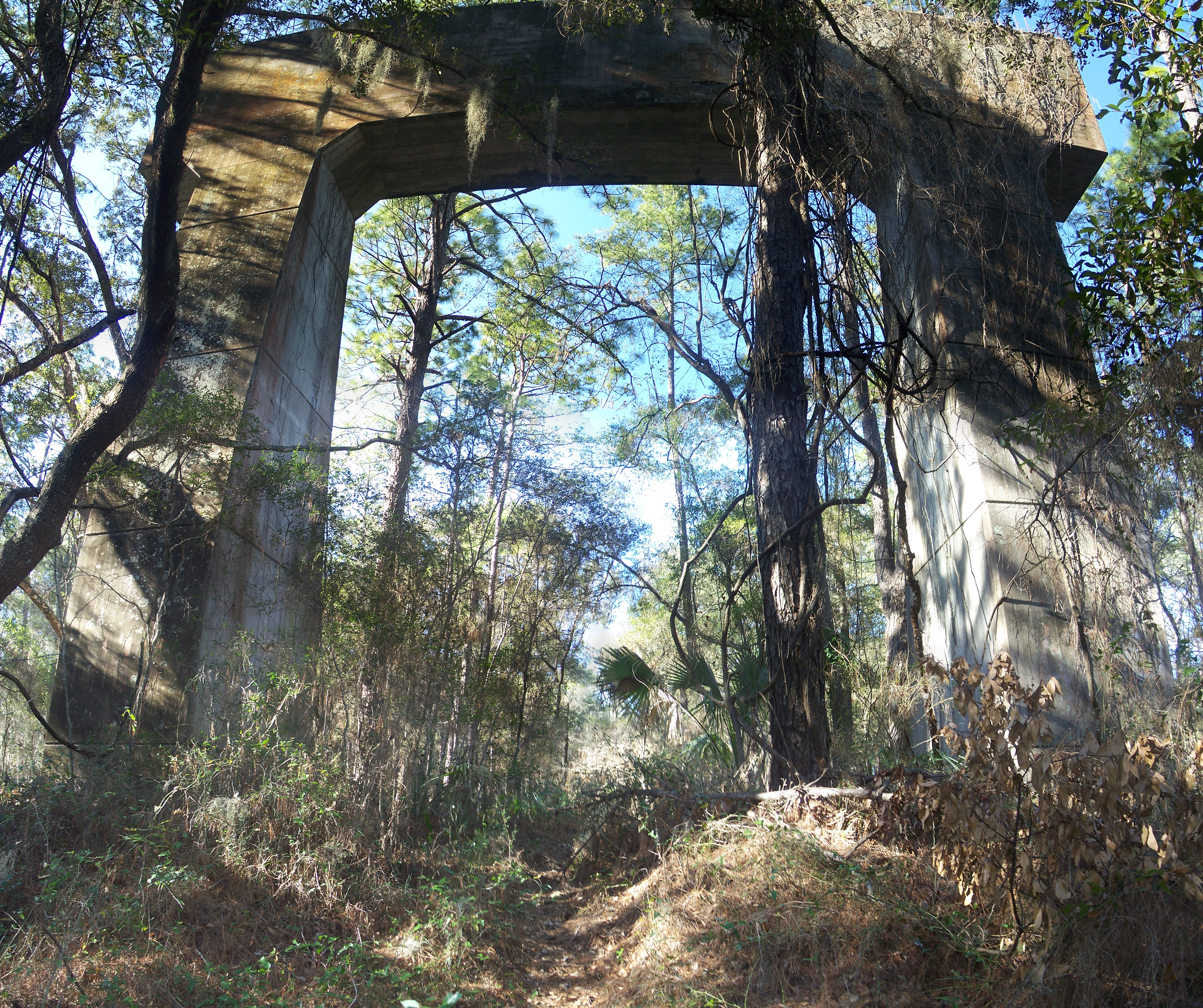
One of the supports for the never completed bridge, in Santos in the US 441 median

The Marjorie Harris Carr Cross Florida Greenway or Marjorie Harris Carr Cross Florida Greenway State Recreation and Conservation Area is a protected green belt corridor, more than one and a half miles (2.4 km) wide in places, that was the former route of the proposed Cross Florida Barge Canal. It is named for the leader of the opposition to the Cross Florida Barge Canal, Marjorie Harris Carr, and was originally a U.S. Army Corps of Engineers canal project to connect the Gulf of Mexico and the Atlantic Ocean across Florida for barge traffic. With a budget repeatedly funded and defunded, starting in 1933, only two sections were built by 1971 when the project was ultimately cancelled due to local opposition related to protecting the state's water supply and conservation of the Ocklawaha River Valley ecosystem, as well as national opposition for the costs being perceived as "government waste" with "limited national value". The canal was officially deauthorized by Congress in 1990, with the open spaces of the waterways and greenway handed over to be part of the system of Florida State Parks, including the Santos Trail System, and is managed by the Florida Department of Environmental Protection.

== History ==
The idea of a canal across the Florida peninsula was first proposed by Philip II of Spain in 1567 as a shorter and safer route for Spanish treasure ships. It was repeatedly considered over the years but found to be economically unviable. Secretary of War John C. Calhoun once again proposed a canal in 1818 as a remedy for commercial losses from shipwrecks and piracy. The Florida Railroad, finished in 1861, served a similar purpose, connecting the Atlantic Ocean at Fernandina to the Gulf of Mexico at Cedar Key.

In the 1930s, regional politicians lobbied the federal government to fund canal construction as an economic recovery program, including the creation of the Canal Authority of the State of Florida in 1933. President Franklin D. Roosevelt authorized $5 million in funding for the project in 1935, and the entire project was estimated at $143 million to complete. In 1936, Michigan Senator Arthur Vandenberg challenged the canal, stating that the project never received authorization from the United States Congress. At the time, thirteen million cubic yards (9,900,000 m^{3}) of material had already been excavated, 5,000 acres (2,000 ha) of land cleared, and four bridge piers constructed near Ocala. Funds for construction were also exhausted, so construction stopped. Work was reauthorized by Congress in 1942 as a national defense project, and $93 million was authorized for construction. Dams and locks were used to protect the underground water supply. Support for the project from Washington was sporadic, and funds were never allocated to the Army Corps to actually start construction.

Planning was once again given the go-ahead in 1963 with support from President John F. Kennedy, who allocated one million dollars to the project. The next year, President Lyndon Johnson set off the explosives that started construction. It was intended that the canal, along with the St. Johns-Indian River Barge Canal, would provide a quicker and safer route across Florida by 1971. Opponents subsequently campaigned against the canal on environmental grounds, and a lawsuit was filed against the Army Corps by the Florida Defenders of the Environment and the Environmental Defense Fund. The lawsuit resulted in a temporary injunction against the project in January 1971, and days later was halted by President Richard Nixon's signing of an executive order. Approximately $74 million had been spent on the project up until the 1971 cessation of activities.

The project was officially deauthorized by Congress in 1990, and the lands were turned over to the state of Florida for use as public conservation and recreation area, becoming the Cross Florida Greenway State Recreation and Conservation Area in 1991. In 1998, the land was renamed the Marjorie Harris Carr Cross Florida Greenway in honor of Marjorie Harris Carr, who had led the opposition to the canal with the organization she co-founded, Florida Defenders of the Environment. Carr had died the prior year at age 82.

== Canal route ==
The planned route of the canal followed the St. Johns River from the Atlantic coast to Palatka, the valley of the Ocklawaha River to the coastal divide, and the Withlacoochee River to the Gulf of Mexico. About 28% of the 107 miles (172 km) project was built—the cross-country section 29°32′15″N 81°44′48″W from the St. Johns River to the Ocklawaha River, part of the route along the Ocklawaha, and a small section 29°00′46″N 82°39′54″W at the Gulf of Mexico end up to the dammed Lake Rousseau.

== Economic impact ==
The canal was intended to connect the Atlantic Intracoastal Waterway with the Gulf Intracoastal Waterway at Withlacoochee Bay near Yankeetown. The military and economic impact was expected to be tremendous in that it would serve "to promote the national defense and to promptly facilitate and protect the transport of materials and supplies needful to the Military Establishment". The canal was intended to save travel time and distance for shipping companies by avoiding the longer route through the Florida Straits and link Florida's inland waterways to both coasts.

== Bridges and other infrastructure ==
All the bridges over the St. Johns River north of the canal are high enough for ships or have movable sections. High bridges were built over the canal, as well as several over the Ocklawaha River where it was not widened to the canal. The following are the major roads, railroads, and locks and dams cross the path of the canal:

- Buckman Lock (formerly St. Johns Lock)
- SR 19 (high bridge)
- George Kirkpatrick Dam (formerly Rodman Dam), south of the canal on the Ocklawaha River, forming Rodman Reservoir along the canal
- Eureka Lock & Dam (unfinished)
- CR 316 (high bridge)
- SR 40, Bert Dosh Memorial Bridge (high bridge)
- CR 314 (no bridge)
- SR 35 (no bridge)
- SR 464 (no bridge)
- Florida Northern Railroad Candler line (no bridge)
- CSX S-Line (no bridge)
- US 27-301-441 (SR 25/SR 500) (no bridge, but several unused supports in the median)
- CR 475 (no bridge)
- I-75 (SR 93) (no bridge; recently built land bridge over I-75 for trail users)
- SW 49th Avenue (no bridge; recently built underpass for trail users)
- CR 484 (no bridge)
- SR 200 (no bridge)
- Florida Northern Railroad Red Level line (low bridge over the existing Withlacoochee River)
- US 41 (SR 45), Brittan Alexander Bridge (low bridge over the existing Withlacoochee River)
- Inglis Lock (Inglis Dam is south of the canal on the Withlacoochee River, forming Lake Rousseau along the canal)
- US 19-98 (SR 55), Trooper Ronald Gordon Smith Memorial Bridge (Twin bridges that replaced a much higher bridge in 2010)

Between Lake Rousseau and the Ocklawaha River, discontinuous unwatered excavations mark the canal's planned path, along with different vegetation patterns on the land acquired for the project (as seen from the air). A lock and dam was also built south of the canal on the Ocklawaha River near CR 464C in Marion County.

== Project timeline ==
- May 1933 - Canal Authority of the State of Florida was created to construct and maintain a deep-water ship canal across Florida.
- 1935–1936 - Construction of a ship canal began under the Emergency Relief Appropriations Act of 1935, but work was suspended when Federal funds were depleted.
- July 1942 - Congress authorized construction of the Cross Florida Barge Canal.
- February 1964 - The U.S. Army Corps of Engineers began construction of the Cross Florida Barge Canal.
- 1969 - The Environmental Defense Fund and others filed suit in the U.S. District Court for the District of Columbia seeking temporary and permanent injunction against the construction of the canal.
- January 15, 1971 - The District Court granted a preliminary injunction halting any further construction activities pending the outcome of the litigation.
- January 19, 1971 - President Richard Nixon signed an executive order suspending further work on the Barge Canal. When halted, the project was one-third complete and approximately $74 million had been spent on land acquisition and construction.
- 1979 - Bills filed in Congress to deauthorize the Canal failed to pass.
- May 22, 1990 - A revised federal bill was filed in the U.S. Senate by Senators Bob Graham and Connie Mack providing, among other things, for a minimum 300-yard wide greenway corridor to be maintained along the former Barge Canal route. This bill was agreed to by the entire Florida Congressional delegation.
- May 31, 1990 - The Florida Legislature enacted a deauthorization bill conforming to the consensus bill filed in the U.S. Senate. Most of the provisions were not effective until Congress deauthorized the project.
- October 27, 1990 - Senate Bill 2740 was passed by Congress and sent to the President for signature. The bill deauthorized the Cross Florida Barge Canal project upon acceptance by the Governor and Cabinet of the State of Florida.
- November 28, 1990 - President George H.W. Bush signed SB 2740 into law deauthorizing the Cross Florida Barge Canal project and changing the purpose of the lands to recreation and conservation.
- January 22, 1991 - The Governor and Cabinet of the State of Florida signed a resolution agreeing to the terms of the Federal deauthorization bill thereby officially deauthorizing the Cross Florida Barge Canal project. This action ultimately led to the creation of the Cross Florida Greenway State Recreation and Conservation Area.
- 1998 - The Cross Florida Greenway was officially renamed the Marjorie Harris Carr Cross Florida Greenway in honor of Marjorie Harris Carr, who led the fight to stop the Cross Florida Barge Canal project.
