= Rodman Reservoir =

Rodman Impoundment
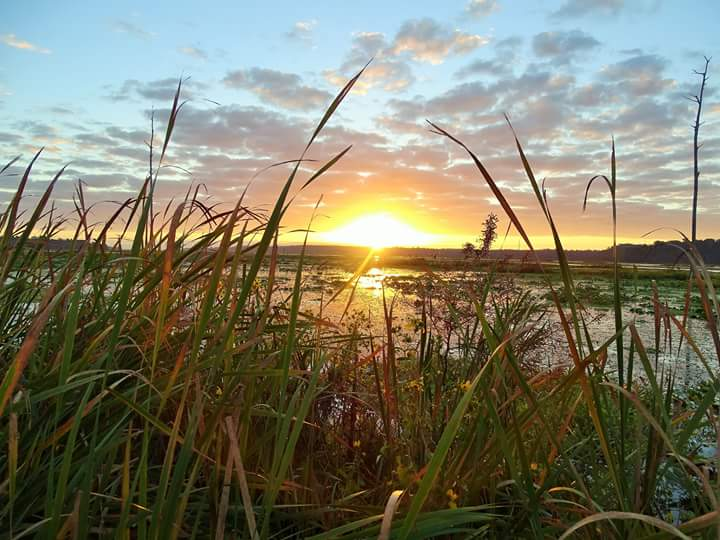
- Sunrise on Rodman Reservoir

- Location within Florida Location within the United States
- Location: Putnam / Marion counties, Florida, United States
- Coordinates: 29°30′26″N 81°54′59″W
- Type: reservoir
- Primary inflows: Ocklawaha River
- Primary outflows: Ocklawaha River
- Basin countries: United States
- Max. length: 16 mi (26 km)
- Max. width: 3 mi (4.8 km)
- Surface area: 13,000 acres (53 km^{2})
- Average depth: 8 ft (2.4 m)
- Max. depth: 30 ft (9.1 m)
- Surface elevation: 20 ft (6.1 m)

Rodman Reservoir, or Lake Ocklawaha, is an artificial reservoir located on the Ocklawaha River in Putnam County and Marion County in north-central Florida. The reservoir, located about 15 miles southwest of Palatka, is approximately 15 miles (24 km) in length, covers 13,000 acres (5,300 ha) and is located between State Road 19 on the east and State Road 315 on the west. It is a premier largemouth bass fishery for Northeast Florida.

Before the U.S. Army Corps of Engineers created the reservoir, they used a mammoth machine called the crusher-crawler to clear sections of the forest along the Ocklawaha's wooded riverbanks. Upon closing Rodman Dam and flooding the reservoir in 1968, the crushed trees floated up to the top of the reservoir.

The earthen dam and reservoir were the first of a set of two dams and reservoirs that the Corps planned to build along the Ocklawaha River to facilitate navigation along the Cross Florida Barge Canal. However, in 1971, due to the successful efforts of environmentalist Marjorie Harris Carr and Florida Defenders of the Environment (FDE), President Richard Nixon halted construction of the canal. Carr worked until her death in 1997 to preserve and restore the Ocklawaha River.

A four-gate spillway (Kirkpatrick Dam) controls the water levels of the reservoir. The reservoir from its headwaters at Eureka Dam to Paynes Landing consists of flooded woodlands. The transition section from Paynes Landing to Orange Springs consists of flooded standing timber and areas of floating vegetation. The pool section from Orange Springs to Kirkpatrick Dam, including the river channel and the extant Cross Florida Barge Canal, consists of floating and submerged vegetation, dead standing timber and submersed and partially submersed trees and stumps. The discontinued Barge Canal and the existing river channel have water depths up to 30 feet (9 m) deep. Submersed vegetation (hydrilla, coontail and eel grass) is common in the pool section of the reservoir. Drawdowns are conducted every three to four years on the reservoir for aquatic plant control and fish and wildlife habitat enhancement.

Rodman Dam was renamed to the George Kirkpatrick Dam in 1998 to honor Florida state senator George Kirkpatrick, who was one of the dam's biggest proponents. As of 2014, FDE's campaign for a free-flowing Ocklawaha River is in its fifth decade.
