= Lochloosa Lake =

Lake in Florida, United States of America

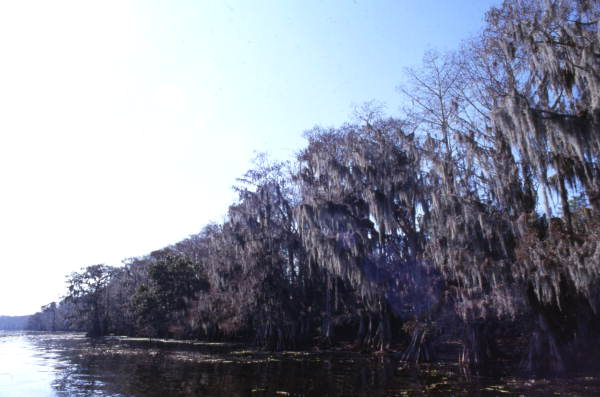
- Lochloosa Lake

- Location within Florida Location within the United States
- Location: Alachua County, Florida
- Coordinates: 29°31′00.296″N 82°07′14.19″W
- Type: Lake
- Primary outflows: Cross Creek
- Surface area: 6,100 acres (2,500 ha)
- Max. depth: 10 feet (3.0 m)

Lochloosa Lake is a lake about 5,700 acres (2,300 ha) in area in Alachua County, Florida, near Hawthorne, and is up to 10 feet (3.0 m) deep. It is drained by Cross Creek into Orange Lake. It is largely surrounded by the Lochloosa Wildlife Management Area and is a Fish Management Area. Lochloosa Creek is its largest tributary. The lake is noted for bass and crappie fishing.

The lake has become choked with weeds such as hydrilla. The water level in the lake varies by up to 10 feet (3.0 m). The variation in water level is healthy for the lake, and the Orange Creek Basin Advisory Council decided to not try to force a stable water level.
