= Cross Creek =

Cross Creek may refer to:

== Media ==
- Cross Creek (book), a 1942 memoir by Marjorie Kinnan Rawlings
- Cross Creek (film), a 1983 film starring Mary Steenburgen

== Places in the United States ==
- Cross Creek (Florida), a waterway connecting Orange Lake and Lochloosa Lake in southeastern Alachua County
  - Cross Creek, Florida, a community centered on the Cross Creek waterway
- Cross Creek Township, Ohio
- Cross Creek Township, Pennsylvania
- Cross Creeks National Wildlife Refuge in Stewart County, Tennessee
- Cross Creek (West Virginia)
- Cross Creek Wildlife Management Area, in Brooke County, West Virginia

== Other ==
- Cross Creek Cemetery, a cemetery in Fayetteville, North Carolina
- Cross Creek High School, located in South Augusta, Georgia
- Cross Creek Mall, a shopping mall in Fayetteville, North Carolina
- Cross Creek Pictures, a film production company
- Cross Creek Programs, a therapeutic boarding school in La Verkin, Utah
- Cross Creek Railroad, an extension in Ohio of the Pittsburgh and West Virginia Railway
- Cross Creek railway station, a station located in the Wellington region of New Zealand's North Island
- Cross Creek Trail, a hiking trail in Colorado
