= Dana Hill =

American actress (1964–1996)

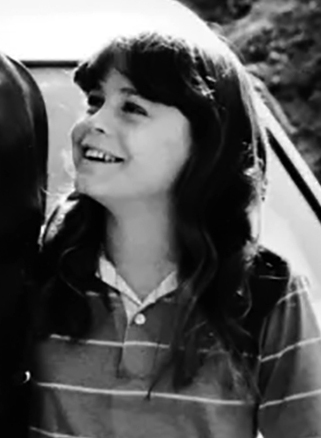
- Hill in 1982
- Born: Dana Lynne Goetz; May 6, 1964; Los Angeles, California, U.S.
- Died: July 15, 1996 (aged 32); Burbank, California, U.S.
- Other name: Dana Hill-Goetz
- Occupation: Actress
- Years active: 1978–1996
- Known for: Audrey Griswold in National Lampoon's European Vacation, Max Goof in Goof Troop
- Television: See below
- Awards: 1986 - L.A. Drama Critics Circle, Best Featured Actress for "Picnic"; 1982 - Young Artist Award, Best Young Actress in a Television Special for "Fallen Angel"; 1984 - Young Artist Award, Best Young Actress - Guest in a Television Series for Magnum, P.I.

Dana Hill (born Dana Lynne Goetz; May 6, 1964 – July 15, 1996) was an American actress. She was known for playing Audrey Griswold in National Lampoon's European Vacation, and also known for her roles in Shoot the Moon and Cross Creek. As a voice actress, she was known for her work as Max Goof in Goof Troop. Hill had type one diabetes that affected physical growth, which meant that she often played children into her adolescence and beyond.

== Life and career ==
=== 1964–1981: Early life and career ===
Dana Lynne Goetz was born on May 6, 1964, in the neighborhood of Encino in Los Angeles, California, to Theodore Arthur "Ted" Goetz, a director of commercials, and Sandy Hill. Excelling at swimming, basketball, and track, Hill placed third nationwide in the 880-yard run and fourth in the mile run at the age of ten. A few weeks later, she collapsed on the track, after which she was diagnosed with type 1 diabetes.

Standing under 5 feet 2 inches (1.57 metres), the disease caused her to stop growing for two years before being detected. Neglecting the disease at first, Hill adopted a sugar-free diet and daily insulin shots after being hospitalized many times. Hill gave up athletics after her physical strength deteriorated from the diabetes. Inspired by Mary Tyler Moore, Hill acted in theatrical productions in Cal Prep High School in Van Nuys, and several commercials. Hill graduated in 1981.

=== 1981–1987: Breakthrough roles ===
Hill landed a major role in The Two of Us (1981–1982) as Gabrielle "Gabby" Gallagher. While filming this series, the 16-year-old Hill would sometimes be pulled over by the police while driving to the studio because she looked too young to drive. Her breakthrough role was in the 1981 television film Fallen Angel. The 16-year-old Hill played 12-year-old molestation victim Jennifer Phillips, a role that earned her a Young Artist Award for Best Young Actress in a Television Special.

In 1982, Hill played Sherry Dunlap in Shoot the Moon. The same year, she played Frankie Addams, the lead character in the made-for-TV adaptation of The Member of the Wedding, co-starring with Pearl Bailey. She starred with Rip Torn and Mary Steenburgen in the 1983 film Cross Creek, a semi-biographical story about Marjorie Kinnan Rawlings, author of The Yearling.

In 1982 and 1983, Hill made two guest appearances in the TV series The Fall Guy. In season 1, episode 18 "Child's Play", she played a young girl called Libby. In season 2, episode 20 "P.S. I Love You" she had the role of 21-year-old stuntwoman Cassie Farraday. In 1983, she made a guest appearance on Magnum, P.I. in the episode "Basket Case". She played Willie, a 13-year-old foster child who joined Magnum's youth basketball team.

At age 19, she starred in a 1984 CBS Schoolbreak Special titled Welcome Home, Jellybean, playing Geraldine "Jellybean" Oxley, a 12-year-old developmentally disabled girl whose parents take her out of an institution so she can experience a normal home life. The same year, she appeared in Shelley Duvall's 1980s children's TV series Faerie Tale Theatre, playing the princess in an episode titled "The Boy Who Left Home to Find Out About the Shivers". In 1986, she had another role in the TV series The Fall Guy. She appeared in the episode "Tag Team".

After being cast as Audrey Griswold in National Lampoon's European Vacation, Hill acted in a few roles on television before quitting due to a deteriorating appearance caused by her kidneys. At the age of 22, an agent persuaded her to do voice acting after watching her performance in the Los Angeles stage production of Picnic.

=== 1987–1996: Voice acting roles ===
Beginning in 1987, she provided the voice for Scrappy, the orphan mouse, on eight episodes of Mighty Mouse: The New Adventures. She also provided the voice of Toots in the episode "The Bright Eyes Mob" for Pound Puppies. She was Teddy-2 in Jetsons: The Movie (1990); from 1989–1991 she voiced Buddy on the animated children's television show Disney's Adventures of the Gummi Bears, in 1991 was the voice of Tank Muddlefoot on Darkwing Duck and in 1992–1993 was the voice of Max on Goof Troop. She was also the speaking voice of Tim (Tom's proclaimed twin brother) in Tom and Jerry Kids. Her voice was featured as Jerry Mouse in Tom and Jerry: The Movie, Norton in the DIC cartoon What-a-Mess, and Charles Duckman in Duckman until her death in 1996. She was also a semi-regular panelist on the 1990s version of To Tell the Truth.

Hill also was a celebrity guest on the game shows Hot Potato (hosted by Bill Cullen), Body Language (hosted by Tom Kennedy) and on the 1990 version of To Tell the Truth.

== Death ==
Casting directors stopped hiring Hill as her body deteriorated over time. In 1996, Hill started to take antidepressants to combat mood swings. After being hospitalized for suffering a stomach disease and mood swings many times, Hill entered a diabetic coma in May, followed by a massive stroke on June 5. Hill died on July 15, at age 32 at Providence Saint Joseph Medical Center in Burbank, California, and her remains were cremated.

== Filmography ==
=== Film ===
Year	Title	Role	Notes
1982	Shoot the Moon	Sherry Dunlap	
1983	Cross Creek	Ellie Turner	
1985	Waiting to Act	Dana	
1985	National Lampoon's European Vacation	Audrey Griswold	
1986	Combat Academy	Sgt Andrea Pritchett	
1990	Jetsons: The Movie	Teddy 2	Voice
1991	Rover Dangerfield	Danny	Voice
1992	Tom and Jerry: The Movie	Jerry Mouse	Voice
1996	The Hunchback of Notre Dame	Additional Voices	Voice
2000	An Extremely Goofy Movie	Young Max Goof	Voice, archival recording
2000	Aladdin and the Adventure of All Time	Additional voices	Voice, posthumously released; final film role

=== Television ===
Year	Title	Role	Notes
1978	Mork & Mindy	Girl Scout	Episode: "Mork the Gullible"
1979	The Paul Williams Show	Debbie	TV film
1979	Featherstone's Nest	Courtney Featherstone	TV film
1979	The French Atlantic Affair	Maggie Joy	TV miniseries
1980	The $5.20 an Hour Dream	Kim Lissick	TV film
1980	The Kids Who Knew Too Much	Foxy Cooper	TV film
1980	ABC Afterschool Special	Michelle Mudd	Episode: "What Are Friends For?"
1980	Family	Martha	Episode: "Smarts"
1981	Fallen Angel	Jennifer Phillips	TV film
1981–1982	The Two of Us	Gabrielle "Gabby" Gallagher	Main role; 20 episodes
1982	The Member of the Wedding	Frankie Addams	TV film
1982–1986	The Fall Guy	Libby, Cassie Farraday, Loser	3 episodes
1983	Magnum, P.I.	Willie	Episode: "Basket Case"
1983	Branagan and Mapes	Gussie Mapes	TV short
1984	CBS Schoolbreak Special	Geraldine "Jellybean" Oxley	Episode: "Welcome Home, Jellybean"
1984	Silence of the Heart	Cindy Lewis	TV film
1984–1985	Faerie Tale Theatre	Princess Amanda, Guest Interviewee	2 episodes
1986	Picnic	Millie Owens	TV film
1986	Combat Academy	Cadet Sergeant Andrea Pritchett	TV film
1987	Pound Puppies	Toots / Colin	Voice, 2 episodes
1987–1988	Mighty Mouse: The New Adventures	Orphan Scrappy / Kid Mouse	Voice, 19 episodes
1988	The Flintstone Kids' Just Say No Special	Stoney	Voice, TV film
1988	The Adventures of Raggedy Ann and Andy	Raggedy Dog	Voice
1988	Fantastic Max	XS	Voice, 3 episodes
1989	Marvin, Baby of the Year	Marvin Miller	Voice, TV short
1990	Bobby's World	Markie	Voice, 4 episodes
1990	Sugar and Spice	Ginger	7 episodes
1990–1991	Disney's Adventures of the Gummi Bears	Buddy Gummi	Voice, 2 episodes
1990–1991	Widget	Kevin	Voice, 14 episodes
1991	Final Verdict	Francy	TV film
1991	Darkwing Duck	Tank Muddlefoot	Voice, 11 episodes
1991	The Legend of Prince Valiant	Young Valiant	Voice, episode: "The Gift"
1991–1994	Rugrats	Various Characters	Voice, 8 episodes
1992	P.J. Sparkles	Sparks	Voice, TV film
1992	Teenage Mutant Ninja Turtles	Foster Fenwick	Voice, episode: "Too Hot to Handle"
1992	Goof Troop	Max Goof	Voice, main role; 70 episodes
1993–1994	The Pink Panther	Additional voices	Voice
1993–1994	Sonic the Hedgehog	Baby T Young Sally	Voice
1993	Bonkers	Timmy	Voice, 2 episodes
1993	Droopy, Master Detective	Additional Voices	Voice
1994	Beethoven	Timmy / Bully	Voice, 2 episodes
1994–1997	Duckman	Charles	Voice, main role; 46 episodes
1995–1996	What-a-Mess	Norton / Archbishop of Canterbury	Voice, 4 episodes
1996	The Hot Rod Dogs and Cool Car Cats	Hot Rod	Voice, 7 episodes
1996	Adventures from the Book of Virtues	Joe Harper	Voice, episode: "Work"; posthumous release
1996	The Spooktacular New Adventures of Casper	Wee Willie Winkle	Voice, episode: "Leave It to Casper"; posthumous release
