= Florida literature =

The literature of Florida includes fiction, nonfiction, poetry, and is considered part of the American regional Southern literature. Florida's literary history extends from Spanish colonial accounts of the 16th century through a naturalist tradition in the 18th century, and includes contributions associated with the Harlem Renaissance and the Southern Gothic in the 20th century. Writers affiliated with Florida include William Bartram, Elizabeth Bishop, James Branch Cabell, Hart Crane, Stephen Crane, Harry Crews, Nilo Cruz, Ernest Hemingway, Carl Hiaasen, Jay Hopler, Zora Neale Hurston, José Martí, Campbell McGrath, Marjorie Kinnan Rawlings, Wallace Stevens and Harriet Beecher Stowe.

== History ==
=== Pre-colonial settlement and native indigenous literature ===
Prior to European contact, the territory now known as Florida was inhabited by several Indigenous peoples, including the Timucua, Calusa, Apalachee, and the Seminole. The Timucua language was documented by Spanish Franciscan missionaries like Francisco Pareja in the late 16th and early 17th centuries, representing some of the earliest written records of a Florida Native language.

=== Early European writing (16th–18th century) ===
In the 1540s, Hernando de Soto's expedition documented four narrative accounts, including the Narrative of a Gentleman from Elvas (1557), a firsthand account by an anonymous Portuguese author, and the La Florida del Inca (1605) by El Inca Garcilaso de la Vega. Garcilaso, the son of an Inca noblewoman and a Spanish conquistador, wrote La Florida in a Renaissance literary style and drew on oral accounts from expedition survivors.

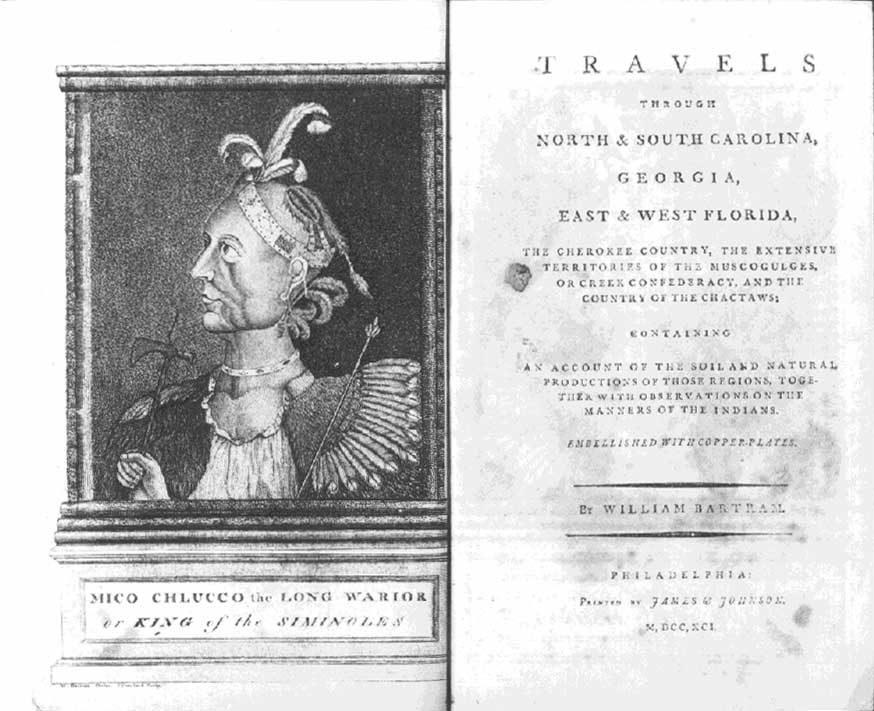
Frontispiece and title page of en:William Bartram's Travels, en:1791

Dutch-born naturalist Bernard Romans spent several years in Florida and published A Concise Natural History of East and West Florida (1775), documenting the region's topography, wildlife, and Native peoples.

William Bartram, a naturalist from Pennsylvania, explored East Florida extensively between 1773 and 1777. His account, published in Philadelphia in 1791 as Travels Through North and South Carolina, Georgia, East and West Florida, catalogued hundreds of plant and animal species and recorded the customs of the Seminole and Creek peoples. Travels is recognized as the first work of environmental literature published in the United States, and its Florida descriptions influenced the English Romantic poets Samuel Taylor Coleridge and William Wordsworth.

A printing press began operating in St. Augustine in 1783.

=== 19th century ===
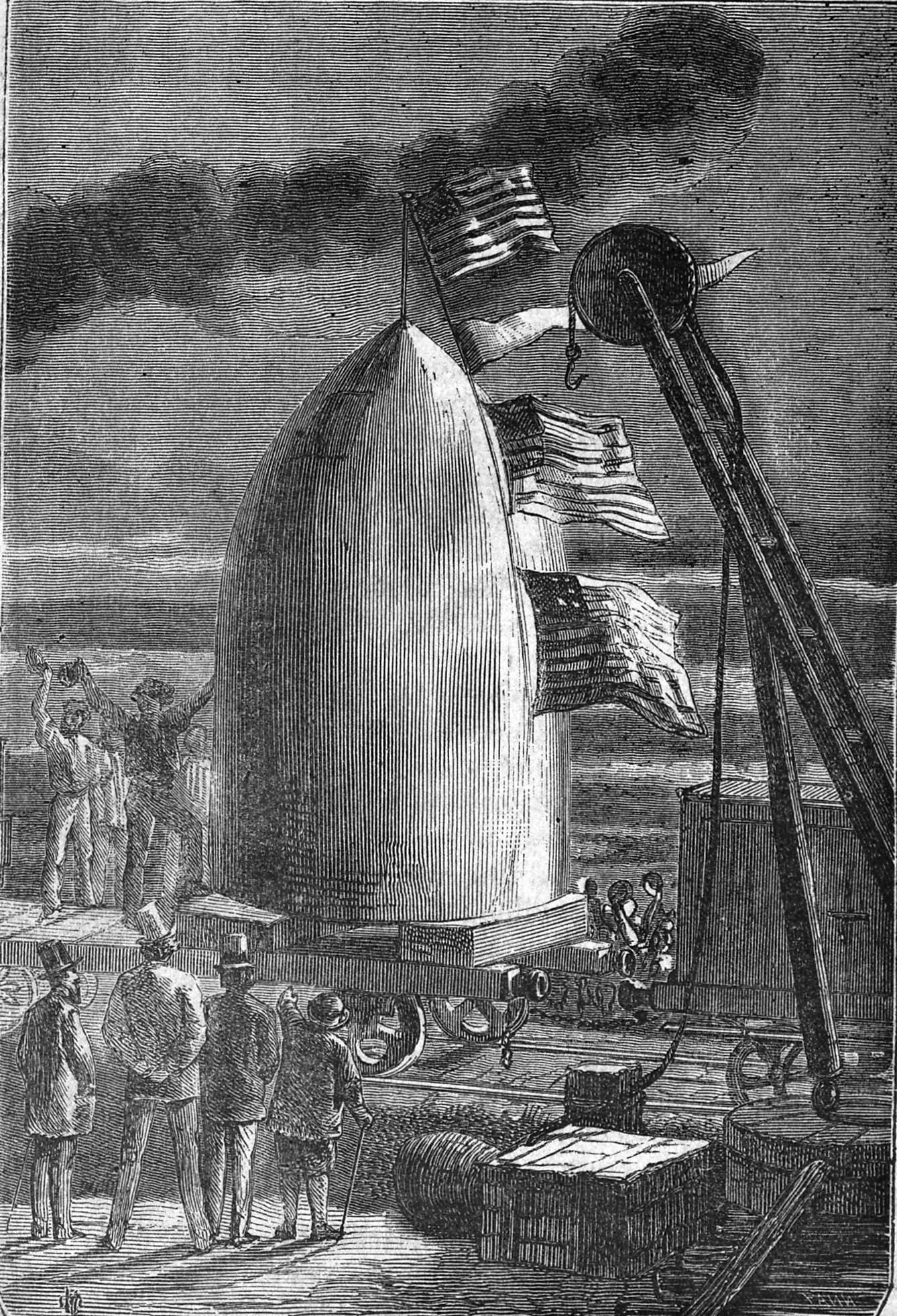
An illustration from From the Earth to the Moon by Jules Verne, illustrated by Henri de Montaut

In the first half of the century, Florida served a similar function in American literature as the West did at a later period, as a way to explore themes of exploration, contact, and transformation. Writers drawn to the state's history included Washington Irving, William Gilmore Simms, and James Fenimore Cooper. The French Romantic writer François-René de Chateaubriand drew on accounts of Florida in his novel Atala (1801), set partly among the Seminoles and Muskogees.

The Seminole Wars (1816-1858) inspired fiction throughout the 19th century. The Reverend Michael Smith's The Lost Virgin of the South (1831), published in Tallahassee under the pseudonym Don Pedro Casender, is the first novel published in Florida; its narrative addresses the First Seminole War and the displacement of Native peoples from their land. Robert Montgomery Bird's The Adventures of Robin Day (1839), set partly in Spanish-era Pensacola and among Creek communities introduced a Florida picaresque tradition.

Jules Verne set his science fiction novel From the Earth to the Moon (De la terre à la lune, 1865) in Tampa, and his later book Nord contre Sud (1887) was set in and around Jacksonville during the Civil War.

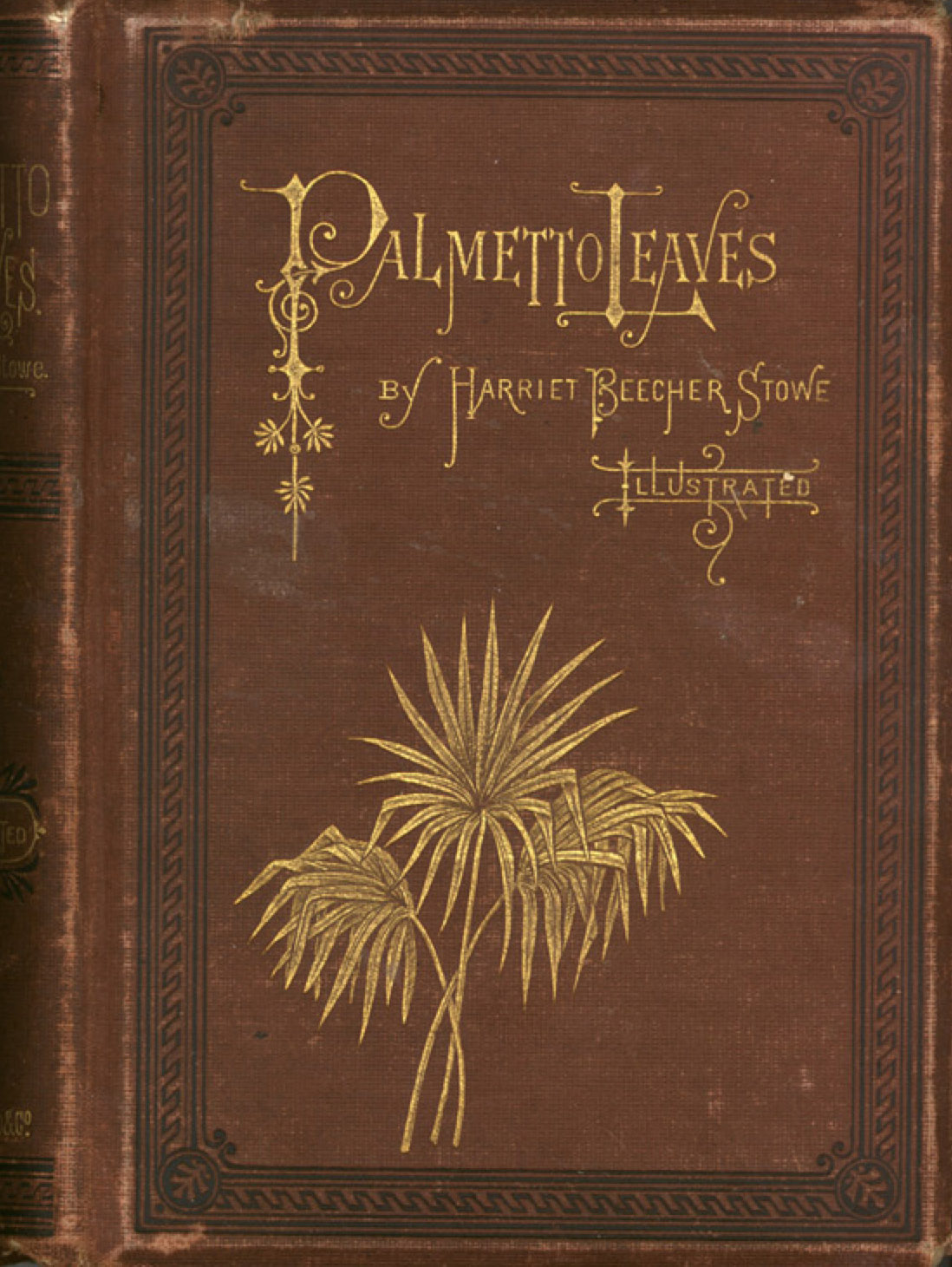
Cover of Palmetto Leaves by Harriet Beecher Stowe

After the Civil War, Florida fiction shifted from pulp adventure publishers toward major houses including Scribner's, Harper Brothers, and Lippincott that shaped the state's early literary identity. Harriet Beecher Stowe, author of Uncle Tom's Cabin, settled in Mandarin, Florida after the Civil War, wintering there from 1867 until 1884. She published Palmetto Leaves (1873), a collection of letters and sketches describing northeast Florida aimed at Northern readers. The book was one of the first travel guides written about Florida and contributed to the state's first boom in tourism in the 1880s, with over 14,000 people visiting Florida from the North after its publication. Caroline Lee Hentz, who settled in Marianna, Florida, wrote Marcus Warland (1852), set on the Florida-Georgia border, and The Planter's Northern Bride (1854), a direct rebuttal to her former Cincinnati acquaintance Harriet Beecher Stowe's Uncle Tom's Cabin.

In the last quarter of the century, women wrote the majority of novels set in the state by the late 1890s. The African American poet Albery Allson Whitman published The Rape of Florida (1884), an epic poem in Spenserian stanzas using the Seminole removal as a metaphor for racial displacement in the United States. Constance Fenimore Woolson (1850–1894), a great-niece of James Fenimore Cooper, drew on her time in St. Augustine for East Angels (1886) in the literary tradition of her friend and mentor Henry James.

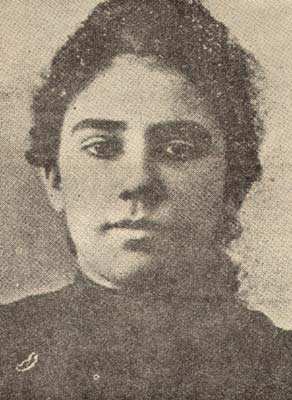
A photo of Juana Borrero taken in 1877

In 1897, Stephen Crane was shipwrecked off the Florida coast when the SS Commodore sank as he was traveling to Cuba as a newspaper correspondent. He adapted the experience into The Open Boat (1897), which was published in Scribner's Magazine and considered a major work of American literary naturalism.

A distinct Spanish-language literary community developed among the Cuban exile populations of Key West and Ybor City in Tampa from the 1860s onward, sustained by a Spanish-language press and the practice of lectores, readers employed to read aloud to cigar factory workers. The poet Juana Borrero, whose work had been published in Cuban literary magazines since 1891, fled to Key West with her family during the 1895 uprising and died there of tuberculosis the following year at the age of eighteen.

=== 20th century ===
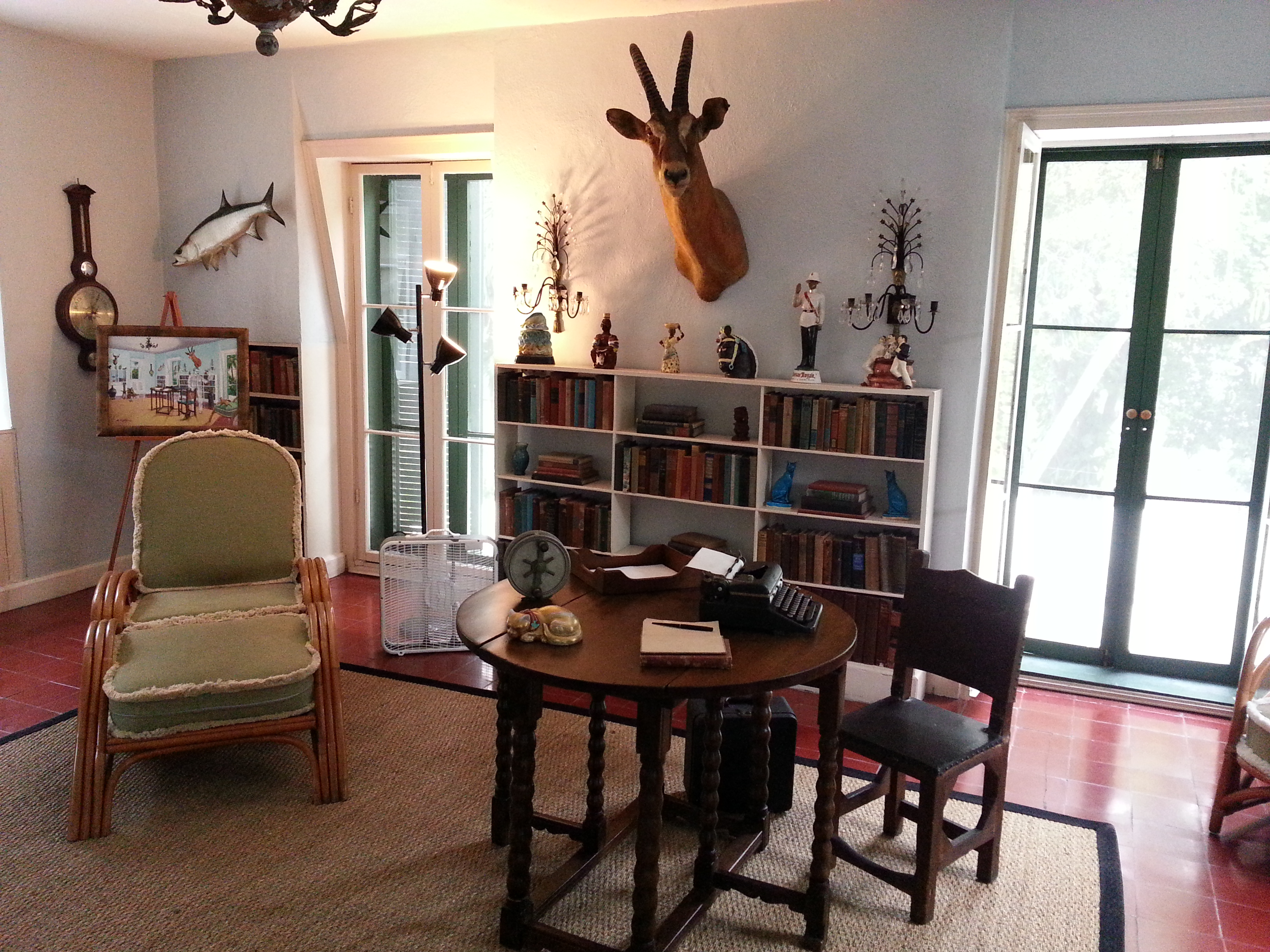
Ernest Hemingway's study in his Key West home

In the early decades of the 20th century, Key West attracted a concentration of writers drawn by its relative isolation, low cost of living, and subtropical landscape. Ernest Hemingway lived there from 1928 to 1939, completing A Farewell to Arms (1929) and writing To Have and Have Not (1937), the only one of his novels set in the United States which uses Depression-era Key West and its fishing communities as its setting. His home on Whitehead Street is now the Ernest Hemingway Home and Museum. The modernist poet Wallace Stevens made regular winter visits to Key West beginning in 1916, and the city provided the setting for his poem The Idea of Order at Key West (1934), considered one of the central works of American literary modernism.

Florida's landscape and the tension between its natural environment and human development became persistent subjects in the state's literature across the century. Marjorie Kinnan Rawlings, who moved to Cross Creek, Florida in 1928, wrote fiction set in rural communities of north-central Florida. Her novel The Yearling (1938), set in the Big Scrub region and explored the relationship between a boy and the wilderness around him, won the Pulitzer Prize for Fiction in 1939 and was the best-selling novel in the United States that year, selling more than 250,000 copies. Marjory Stoneman Douglas, a journalist and conservationist based in Miami, redefined the public perception of the Everglades in The Everglades: River of Grass (1947), arguing that the region was a functioning river ecosystem during a time when most people lacked awareness about swamp ecosystems. The book sold out its first printing in a month and galvanized public interest in protecting the Everglades against development.

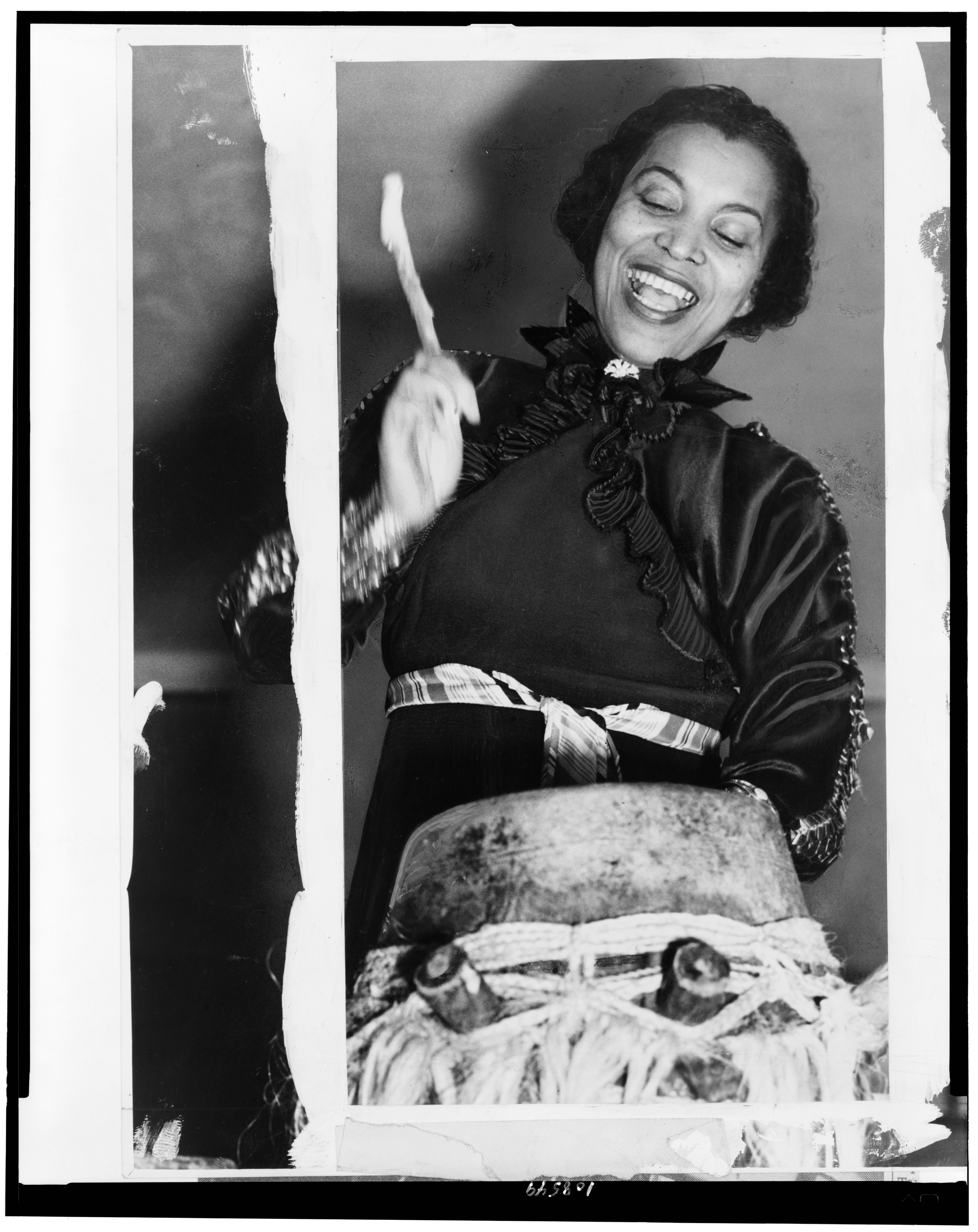
Zora Neale Hurston beating a hountar in 1937

The Federal Writers' Project (1935-1943), part of Roosevelt's Works Progress Administration, hired writers across Florida to document the state's history, folklore, and communities. The Florida unit, directed by Carita Doggett Corse, was among the most productive in the country and produced the state guidebook Florida: A Guide to the Southernmost State (1939). Zora Neale Hurston, who grew up in Eatonville, one of the first incorporated all-Black municipalities in the United States, worked for the Florida unit from 1935 to 1937, collecting folklore and conducting interviews with African-American communities across the state. This fieldwork informed her novel Their Eyes Were Watching God (1937), set in Eatonville and now considered a classic of the Harlem Renaissance.

=== Post-war period ===
In the postwar decades, rapid population growth, large-scale real estate development, and the influx of migrants from across the United States and Latin America transformed Florida's social landscape and generated a body of crime fiction rooted in those conditions. John D. MacDonald, who settled in Sarasota, began publishing Florida-set crime novels in 1950 and introduced his series character Travis McGee in The Deep Blue Good-by (1964). McGee, a salvage consultant living on a houseboat in Fort Lauderdale, appeared in 21 novels through 1985; the Florida Department of State credits the series as the catalyst for an entire genre of Florida-based fiction addressing the state's ecological destruction and political corruption brought on by rapid development. Carl Hiaasen, a journalist and novelist at the Miami Herald, extended this tradition of satirical crime fiction through novels including Native Tongue (1991) and Sick Puppy (1999), using the genre to address ongoing environmental destruction and political corruption in the state.

=== 21st century ===
Florida's long tradition of environmental writing continued in Southern Gothic and speculative fiction. Karen Russell, a native of Miami, used the Ten Thousand Islands and the Florida Everglades as the primary setting for her debut novel Swamplandia! (2011), a Pulitzer Prize for Fiction finalist that critics placed in the Southern Gothic tradition of the state's earlier wilderness fiction. Jeff VanderMeer, based in Tallahassee, drew on the coastal wilderness of St. Marks National Wildlife Refuge and the 2010 Deepwater Horizon oil disaster as the basis for his Southern Reach trilogy, beginning with Annihilation (2014), which won the Nebula Award for Best Novel.

The University Press of Florida anthology Home in Florida: Latinx Writers and the Literature of Uprootedness (2021) collected fiction, essays, and poetry by writers of Caribbean, Central American, and South American heritage living in the state, reflecting the growth of South Florida's Spanish-language literary community Jaquira Díaz, born in Puerto Rico and raised in Miami Beach, published Ordinary Girls (2019), a memoir set across Puerto Rico and Miami that won a Whiting Award and a Florida Book Awards Gold Medal.

== Literary Organizations ==
The Florida Publishers Group formed in 1983. The Florida Center for the Book was established in 1984. The South Florida Writers Association formed in 1990, and the Florida Writers Association in 2001.

== Literary journals of Florida ==
The Florida Review is a national literary journal published twice yearly by the University of Central Florida. First published in 1972, it has featured poetry, fiction, and nonfiction by writers including Margaret Atwood, Grace Paley, Lorrie Moore, and Tobias Wolff. Subtropics is a biannual literary magazine published by the University of Florida in Gainesville. Founded in 2006, it publishes literary fiction, essays, poetry, and translations, and has had work reprinted in Best American Poetry, The Best American Short Stories and the Pushcart Prize anthology.

== Awards and events ==
The Key West Literary Seminar began in 1983, and the Miami Book Fair in 1984. The Florida Book Awards for "best Florida literature" began in 2006, administered by Florida State University Libraries; recent nonfiction awardees include Susan Cerulean, Jack E. Davis, Gilbert King, Henry Knight, William McKeen, and Margaret Ross Tolbert.

== See also ==
- Florida literature (in French)
- Southern Gothic
- Category:Florida in fiction
- Category:Writers from Florida
- Cuban American literature (related in part to literature of Florida)
- List of newspapers in Florida
- Category:Florida folklore
- Category:Libraries in Florida
- Floridiana
- Southern literature (United States)
- American literary regionalism
- Federal Writers' Project

== Bibliography ==
- Lucian Lamar Knight, ed. (1913). "Fifty Reading Courses: Florida". Library of Southern Literature. Vol. 16. Atlanta: Martin and Hoyt Company. p. 185+. hdl:2027/uc1.31175034925258 – via HathiTrust.
- Elsie Dershem (1921). "Florida". Outline of American State Literature. Lawrence, Kansas: World Company. pp. 33+ – via Internet Archive.
- Harold Rinalden Saunders (1929). English Books Written by Floridians. University of Florida. OCLC 82849499.
- Pattie Porter Frost (April 1930). "Preliminary Checklist of Floridiana, 1500-1865, in the Libraries of Florida". Florida Library Bulletin (2). OCLC 18697213.
- Federal Writers' Project (1939), "Literature", Florida; a Guide to the Southernmost State, American Guide Series, pp. 136–148, ISBN 9781623760090 – via Google Books
- Martine J. O'Connor; Works Progress Administration, Historical Records Survey (1948). Florida Imprints, 1782-1876. OCLC 40779313.
- Janette C. Gardner (1983). Annotated Bibliography of Florida Fiction 1801-1980. ISBN 0960980407.
- "Rawlings Journal of Florida Literature". OCLC 187467443. 1988-
- Kevin M. McCarthy, ed. (1992). Book Lover's Guide to Florida. Sarasota: Pineapple Press. ISBN 978-1-56164-021-8.
- Anne E. Rowe (2001). "Literature of Florida". In Joseph M. Flora; Lucinda Hardwick MacKethan (eds.). Companion to Southern Literature: Themes, Genres, Places, People, Movements, and Motifs. Louisiana State University Press. pp. 264-267. ISBN 978-0-8071-2692-9.
- Bev Hogue (2016). "Florida Gothic: Shadows in the Sunshine State". In Susan Castillo Street; Charles L. Crow (eds.). Palgrave Handbook of the Southern Gothic. Springer. pp. 149–160. ISBN 978-1-137-47774-3.
- John W. Lowe (2016). "Not-so-still Waters Travelers: to Florida and the Tropical Sublime". In Fred Hobson; Barbara Ladd (eds.). Oxford Handbook of the Literature of the U.S. South. Oxford University Press. ISBN 978-0-19-049394-3.

=== Examples of Floridiana ===
- Maurice J. O'Sullivan; Jack C. Lane, eds. (1991). Florida Reader: Visions of Paradise. Pineapple Press Inc. ISBN 978-1-56164-062-1. (Anthology)
- Gloria Jahoda (1984). "Suggestions for Further Reading". Florida: a History. W. W. Norton. pp. 201+. ISBN 978-0-393-30178-6. (Bibliography)
