= The Secret River (Rawlings book) =

1955 children's book by Marjorie Kinnan Rawlings

- Cover of first edition
- Author: Marjorie Kinnan Rawlings
- Illustrator: Leonard Weisgard
- Language: English
- Genre: Picture Book, Magical Realism, Southern Regionalism
- Publisher: Scribners
- Publication date: 1955
- Pages: 56
- ISBN: 978-1-4169-1179-1
- OCLC: 301724

The Secret River is a children's fantasy novel by Marjorie Kinnan Rawlings, author of The Yearling. Published in 1955, The Secret River received a Newbery Honor Award. The first edition, illustrated by Caldecott Medal winner Leonard Weisgard, was issued after Rawlings' death. The book was revised and reissued in 2009 with illustrations by Caldecott Medalists Leo and Diane Dillon. The new edition received an international children's book design award in 2012. The Secret River is the only book Rawlings wrote specifically for children. The story of young Calpurnia, who goes on a quest to find a magical river and catch fish for her starving family and friends, it has two themes common in Rawlings' writing, the magic of childhood and the struggle of people to survive in a harsh environment.

== Plot ==
The Secret River is a story of Magical realism, blending real life and fantasy. Young Calpurnia is an aspiring poet living in rural Central Florida during the Great Depression. Hard times have come to her people; the animals have disappeared, her father is unable to catch fish to sell, and everyone in the community is too weak from hunger to work. Calpurnia bravely leaves home with her little dog, Buggy-Horse, to find the secret river that her neighbor Mother Albirtha has told her about. She intends to catch fish for her father to sell in his shop. When she finds the river she politely asks it to allow her to catch some fish and uses her creativity, and the pink ribbons from her hair, to catch them. On her way home, an owl, a bear and a panther each challenge her, and she has to give away some of her catch to get home. She also shares some fish with Mother Albirtha and takes the rest to her father, who gives them to the starving people in return for future payment. Strengthened by the fish, people begin working again. When the crisis is past Calpurnia searches for the river again, but cannot find it, as she no longer really needs it. Still, she realizes nothing is lost to us forever, and the book ends with one of her poems, expressing this sentiment:

Secret River is in my mind.
I can go there any time.
Everything Mother Albirtha says is true.
The sky is gold and the river is blue.
Secret River, I love you.

== Background ==
The Secret River is Rawlings' only book intended for children. According to Murray Laurie, the idea for the book came from something Rawlings had written in Cross Creek: "some day a poet will write a sad and lovely story of a Negro child." She discussed the idea with her Scribner's editor, Maxwell Perkins, who encouraged her to follow it up. While working on the manuscript she told Perkins she "deliberately avoided Negro dialect. 'No Uncle Remus or Little Black Sambo sort of stuff'". At one point she thought about making the story into a full-length novel. Helen Masten, writing for The Saturday Review, commented "Had this happened this little masterpiece of the imagination of childhood might never have reached children, to whom it rightly belongs." Rawlings also talked about her ideas with Bob Camp, an illustrator and friend. From that conversation, Camp produced a series of paintings to illustrate the idea. In 1947 Rawlings sent The Secret River's manuscript to Perkins, and Camp visited his office in New York with the paintings. When Perkins responded with suggestions, Rawlings confessed to him that she was not completely pleased with Camp's illustrations. By June of that year, Perkins' death from pneumonia and Rawlings' own personal problems had derailed the project. After Rawlings' death in 1953, the manuscript for The Secret River was the only complete manuscript found among her papers.

In Marjorie Kinnan Rawlings' Rivers Lamar York says that Rawlings' settings are an essential part of her plots, and that she did not choose to write about a river by accident. At a low time in her life she had taken time off and traveled the length of the St. Johns River with a friend. Later she wrote about the boat trip in "Hyacinth Drift", a chapter of Cross Creek. The trip, she said, cured her depression and allowed her to live in peace, as The Secret River did for Calpurnia and her community. The river, York writes, expresses Rawlings' belief that "man must know or discover a relationship to a suitable physical setting" in order to survive the harshness of the world, as she herself did on the St. Johns.

== Themes ==
The Secret River's primary theme revolves around Calpurnia's desire to help her family and friends survive tough times. As Barbara Elleman wrote in School Library Journal, "Overriding the adventure is the determination and spirited effort of the child to help her family in need." The struggle to live in the face of difficult circumstances was a common theme for Rawlings. In The Secret River this struggle means Calpurnia must find her way to the river, convince it to yield its precious fish, then overcome danger from starving wild animals to return with the fish to her father. Calpurnia's courage and determination enable her to overcome every obstacle and save her community.

Juxtaposed against the struggle to survive is the enchanting but short beauty of childhood. The magic in the plot reinforces the sense of enchantment and gives the book a fairy-tale like quality, leading the BolognaRagazzi Awards jury to speak of "the great Secret (that) lurks in the story". It is the child Calpurnia who follows the magic to find the river and save the adults from starvation. The contrast of an idealized and protected childhood with the harsh realities that adults must face is another theme common to Rawlings' writings, expressed in the famous speech about adult reality Ezra "Penny" Baxter delivers to his son Jody at the end of The Yearling: "Ever' man wants life to be a fine thing, and a easy. 'Tis fine, boy, powerful fine, but 'tain't easy. Life knocks a man down and he gits up and it knocks him down again. . . . What's he to do then? . . . Why, take it for his share and go on." Unlike Jody, who realizes the magic of his childhood is "gone forever" with the death of his fawn, Calpurnia retains the secret river and the magic in her mind.

== Editions, awards ==
The Secret River appeared two years after Rawlings' death with illustrations by the 1948 Caldecott Medal winner Leonard Weisgard, who used coffee-coloured paper as an innovative way to circumvent a taboo of the era against portraying dark-skinned characters. In his book In the Company of Writers, Charles Scribner discusses The Secret River's publication, noting Rawlings never mentions Calpurnia's race. Since the book went into production after her death Rawlings could not be consulted about her final intentions. At this time the depiction of black children in American children's literature had decreased until it was almost non-existent. While a few books were still appearing, "White (children's) publishers were still not open to books with Black themes", according to Joyce Braden Harris on "African and African-American Traditions in Language Arts". Scribner pointed out that "Whatever our decision, we could land on the wrong side of the school boards", and claims the idea for using dark paper in the book as a way to suggest Calpurnia's race was his, calling it "one of my silent contributions to dissolving the color barrier in the 1950s." The book received a Newbery Honor Award in 1956 for "the most distinguished contribution to American literature for children", and was honored by the American Society of Graphic Arts.

Atheneum Books for Young Readers reissued a revised version of the book in 2009. The story was shortened by cutting some descriptive passages and allowing the illustrations to convey the setting. Calpurnia's final poem was also eliminated. New illustrations in acrylics were created by Leo and Diane Dillon, who went on to win two Caldecott Awards. Unlike the more realistic illustrations by Weisgard, the Dillons emphasized the magical reality of the story, as in the cover picture, where Calpurnia's profile is almost hidden inside a stylized blue fish. Mary Harris Russell, writing for The Chicago Tribune, felt modern audiences would appreciate the way "the fantasy side to this land of cypress trees and silent rivers is amplified and contrasted with the realistic background of little Calpurnia's life." The Dillon's version of The Secret River received one of two honorable mentions in the fiction category of the 2012 BolognaRagazzi Awards, an international children's book award that honors the art and design of illustrated books worldwide. In the words of the Bologna jury, "It is only fitting that Marjorie Rawlings, the great American writer loved by so many generations of readers, is finally paid such a refined and sensitive tribute."

== Critical reception ==
When The Secret River first appeared in 1955, Saturday Review called it a "little masterpiece of the imagination of childhood... so real and appealing one regrets that this is the only book the author wrote for children... Leonard Weisgard has done some of his most sensitive work in drawings that have a feeling for character and place and are quite perfect for the text." Decades later the book continued to receive strong reviews, with words like "Magical" and "timeless". Reviewers appreciated the message of hope conveyed in the simple story.

The new edition of The Secret River also received positive reviews. Publishers Weekly gave it a starred review, as did Kirkus Reviews, calling it a "classic tale... Rawlings' voice is warm and tender, employing lilting syntax and descriptive language that resonates with warmth and humor. Calpurnia is a sweet delight... filled with love and compassion", and the Dillon's illustrations are, "glorious, glowing... nothing short of breathtaking". Monica and Hannah McRae Young, in their article "Books do justice to subjects of civil rights, racism", praise The Secret River as "A rare picture book depicting everyday black life". They believe modern readers will enjoy Calpunia and Buggy-horse as much as the original audience. Children's Literature agreed that the reissue would renew interest in the book.
