= Marjorie Kinnan Rawlings Historic State Park =

State park in Florida, United States

- Marjorie Kinnan Rawlings House
- U.S. National Register of Historic Places
- U.S. National Historic Landmark
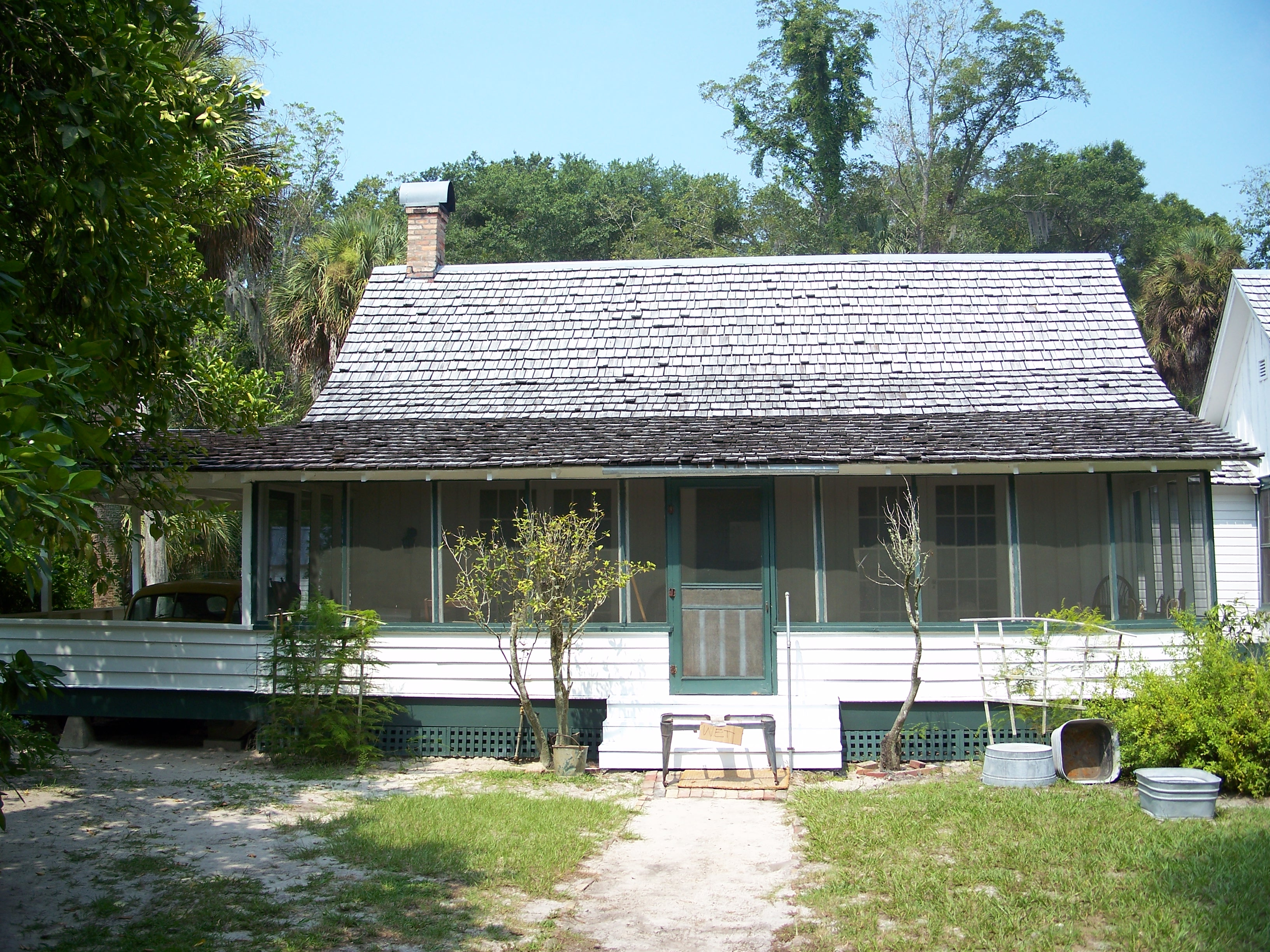
- View of the Kinnan Rawlings home

- Location within Florida Location within the United States
- Interactive map showing the location of Marjorie Kinman Rawlings House
- Location: Cross Creek, Alachua County, Florida
- Coordinates: 29.480002352235978°N 82.15993460123357°W
- Built: circa 1890
- NRHP reference No.: 70000176

Significant dates
- Added to NRHP: September 29, 1970
- Designated NHL: September 20, 2006

Marjorie Kinnan Rawlings Historic State Park is a Florida State Park and historic site located on the former homestead of Pulitzer Prize-winning Florida author Marjorie Kinnan Rawlings (1896–1953). A National Historic Landmark, it is located in Cross Creek, Florida, between Ocala and Gainesville at 18700 South County Road 325.

== Setting ==
Marjorie Kinnan Rawlings Historic State Park is located on the eastern shore of Orange Lake, a short way south of the village of Cross Creek. The park is about 8 acres (3.2 ha) in size, but is adjacent to public lands totalling about 115 acres (47 ha) historically part of the Rawlings property. A public parking area and boat ramp are located south of the house, gardens, and outbuildings of the Rawlings home. The home is a rambling single-story wood-frame structure, whose central core is a dogtrot house dating to the 19th century. Other buildings include a pump house, barn, and a small tenant house. Of these, only the pump house is also of 19th-century origin.

== History ==
Marjorie Kinnan Rawlings, a native of Washington, DC, and her husband Charles purchased a 75-acre (30 ha) orange grove in 1929, including the old dogtrot house. They set about enlarging and adapting the house to their use, and both developed their careers as writers. Marjorie first achieved significant notice with stories published in Scribner's Magazine, and was awarded the Pulitzer Prize in 1939 for The Yearling. Her writing was infused with details from the central Florida region where she made her home.

Upon her death in 1953, the property was bequeathed to a foundation of the University of Florida. It has been managed by the state ever since, the house opening to the public in 1970.

== Park activities ==
Activities include hiking and hourly tours Thursday through Sunday, at 10 a.m. 11 a.m. and from 1 p.m. to 4 p.m., except in August and September. Amenities include two short hiking trails and park employees that bring 1930s rural Florida to life with period clothing and stories. In addition, guests are invited to pick and sample oranges from the many trees within the property.

Florida state parks are open between 8 a.m. and sundown every day of the year (including holidays). The cost is $3 per car to enter the park.

== See also ==
- List of National Historic Landmarks in Florida
- List of residences of American writers
- National Register of Historic Places listings in Alachua County, Florida
- Florida State Parks in Alachua County
