= The Yearling (TV series) =

1983 anime series

子鹿物語 THE YEARLING (Kojika Monogatari)
- Anime television series
- Directed by: Masaaki Ōsumi
- Produced by: Yoshiro Hirota; Watanabe Tadami; Ishiguro Kouichi
- Written by: Shun'ichi Yukimuro
- Music by: Koichi Sugiyama; Jun'ichi Kamiyama
- Studio: MGM/UA Television; MK Company
- Licensed by: NA: Warner Bros. Domestic Television Distribution (via Turner Entertainment Co.)
- Original network: NHK G
- Original run: November 8, 1983 – January 29, 1985
- Episodes: 52

The Yearling (Japanese: 子鹿物語, Hepburn: Kojika Monogatari), also known in English as Fortunate Fawn, is a Japanese anime series from 1983. The series is based on Marjorie Kinnan Rawlings's 1938 novel of the same name. It has been produced in association with MGM/UA Entertainment Co. Television Distribution. Warner Bros. through Turner Entertainment Co. holds the rights to the series since 1986.

Despite the similar art style, this anime is unrelated to the World Masterpiece Theater series and is also based on the 1946 film by Metro-Goldwyn-Mayer.

The anime was not particularly successful during its original airing, and has faded into obscurity throughout the years. In Japan, it has never had any re-airings since the 1990s, nor has it ever been released on DVD or home video. The series has been released on DVD in the Netherlands, except for episode 33, whose Dutch dub masters were in bad condition, and episode 51, which was skipped in the dub.

== World's first full digital production ==
Episode 2 of the series is notable due to it being the world's first full digital production.
