= Lew Hunter =

American screenwriter (1935–2023)

- Born: Lewis R. Hunter; July 18, 1935; Guide Rock, Nebraska, U.S.
- Died: January 6, 2023 (aged 87); Tucson, Arizona, U.S.
- Occupations: Writer; Author; Educator
- Known for: Screenwriting 434

Lewis R. Hunter (July 18, 1935 – January 6, 2023) was an American screenwriter, author, and educator. He was chairman Emeritus and Professor of Screenwriting at the UCLA Department of Film and Television.

Over half of the Oscar winning scripts over the past twenty years have been written by students of Hunter. His former students and advocates include notable people such as Adrienne Parks, Allison Anders, David Koepp, Mike Werb, Sacha Gervasi, Dan Pyne, David Titcher, James Dalessandro, Diane Saltzberg, Michael Colleary, Don Mancini, Kathy Stumpe, Darren Star, Alexander Payne and Tom Shadyac. Other students include Chuck Loch, Paige Macdonald, Robert Wolfe, Joel Schumacher, Megan Steinbeck, Robert Roy Poole, Lon Diamond, Laurie Hutlzer, Pamela Gray, William Missouri Downs, Robin Russin, Brad Silberling, Greg Widen, Vinnie Langdon III, and many others. Steven Spielberg has called Hunter "the best screenwriting teacher going".

== Background ==
A native of Nebraska, Hunter had a bachelor's degree and honorary doctorate from Nebraska Wesleyan University (where he was a member of Phi Kappa Tau fraternity) and had master's degrees from Northwestern University and UCLA. After college, he worked as a radio station late night manager, where he did everything including playing records, giving news updates and reading weather reports. He moved to Los Angeles in the mid 50s, with the intention of becoming an actor. Needing to support his family as he struggled to find roles, he took a minimum wage paying job at NBC, where he worked in the mail room, answered phone calls, swept floors and acted as a delivery driver. Hunter shifted his focus from performing to working behind the camera, finding much more success once he did.

Hunter worked extensively in television, first in programming and production on a wide range of popular television shows such as Bewitched, Batman, Little House on the Prairie, and The Rockford Files, before he moved into the creative side, writing TV movies and series such as The Sound of Love, If Tomorrow Comes, Fallen Angel, and The Yellow Rose.

Hunter joined the UCLA faculty in 1979 as a professor of screenwriting. In 1988, he was made chairman of the department. While at UCLA, he started "The Writer's Block", a gathering of writers at his home in Burbank to do table readings and exchange notes and feedback on stories they were working on. He retired from UCLA in 2000. He taught one class each winter semester from 2001 to 2015.

Hunter helped to found the American Screenwriters Association and has been inducted into its Hall of Fame. Hunter returned to Nebraska in 2003, living in the small town of Superior, where he taught seminars for aspiring screenwriters from 2004 to 2014. He retired completely from teaching in 2016 and moved to Tucson, Arizona, in 2018.

Hunter was one of the founders of the Nebraska Coast Connection, a monthly gathering of entertainment professionals originally from Nebraska now living and working in Los Angeles. He also was involved in the annual Omaha Film Festival.

Hunter was married twice, and was still married to his second wife, Pamela, at the time of his death. He had four children from his first marriage.

Hunter died from COVID-19 in Tucson, Arizona, on January 6, 2023, at the age of 87.

== Screenwriting 434 ==
Every winter, Hunter returned to UCLA to teach his Screenwriting 434 course to graduate students in the screenwriting MFA program, the modern form of which he helped create. In 1998, nine of the ten top-grossing films were written by graduates of UCLA's screenwriting MFA program. His bestselling book on screenwriting is entitled Screenwriting 434.
