= Cross Creek (book) =

1942 memoir by Marjorie Kinnan Rawlings

Cross Creek is a 1942 memoir by American author Marjorie Kinnan Rawlings. A work of creative nonfiction, it comprises a series of sketches based on Rawlings' life and that of her neighbors in the small rural community of Cross Creek, Florida. Cross Creek has been critically well received since its publication, and remains Rawlings' second best known work after her 1938 novel The Yearling.

== Contents ==
Cross Creek begins with a description of the town and wilderness when Rawlings first arrived. It contains a series of vignettes about different people and events that Rawlings had gotten to know during her time there. Notable sketches include those describing Beatrice, also known as 'Geechee, a Gullah-Geechee worker Rawlings hired as a housekeeper until her alcoholism and self-destructive behavior cause a break, and detail Rawlings' experience helping her "profane friend" Zelma collect data for the 1930 United States census.

== Background ==
Marjorie Kinnan Rawlings had moved to the community of Cross Creek, Florida, in 1928 after purchasing an orange grove with an inheritance from her mother. Rawlings and her husband Chuck had been living in Rochester, New York, where they wrote for the local newspapers. Marjorie's column, Songs of a Housewife, was canceled in February, after which the Rawlingses traveled to Florida to visit Chuck's brothers. Falling in love with the state, and dissatisfied with their lives and careers in Rochester, the couple decided to move. Using a small inheritance from her mother, Rawlings purchased a farm and orange grove in Cross Creek sight unseen.

The rural environment of North Central Florida and its Florida cracker inhabitants inspired Rawlings' subsequent writing. She shifted from her previous newspaper column work into literary writing with short stories including "Cracker Chidlings" and "Jacob's Ladder". In 1931 Scribner's Magazine published four of Rawling's short stories and essays, which brought her to the attention of editor Maxwell Perkins, already known for having discovered Ernest Hemingway and F. Scott Fitzgerald. This relationship led to her first novel, South Moon Under, published in 1933.

Perkins encouraged Rawlings to write a boys' book about Florida river travel, guns, and dogs. She turned instead to a project titled Golden Apples, a contrived novel about an Englishman exiled to an orange grove. Golden Apples was published in 1935. She hoped next to write a book-length work of creative nonfiction, which she envisioned as a combination of existing and new vignettes as Cross Creek: A Chronicle. Nevertheless, she first returned to Perkins' suggestion and wrote The Yearling (1938), which become the commercial and artistic success that Perkins had predicted..

Thereafter, Cross Creek remained Rawlings' "chief obsession", and she continued working on it while preparing her first short story collection, When the Whippoorwill, published in 1940. Perkins encouraged her in the work writing to her that: "I think that the book should be a narrative, varied somewhat by description and by reflection—to use a figure, it should be a single piece of string, with knots in it, the knots being the episodes, but each connect with the others by the incidents, etc."
