= Fallen Angel (1981 film) =

1981 television film by Robert Michael Lewis

- VHS cover
- Genre: Drama
- Written by: Lew Hunter
- Directed by: Robert Lewis
- Starring: Melinda Dillon; Richard Masur; Dana Hill; Ronny Cox
- Music by: Richard Bellis
- Country of origin: United States
- Original language: English

Production
- Executive producers: Jim Green; Allen Epstein
- Producers: Lew Hunter; Audrey Blasdel-Goddard
- Production location: Los Angeles
- Cinematography: Michael Margulies
- Editor: Robert F. Shugrue
- Running time: 96 minutes
- Production companies: Green/Epstein Productions; Columbia Pictures Television

Original release
- Network: CBS
- Release: February 24, 1981

Fallen Angel is a 1981 American made-for-television drama film that explores child pornography. It was directed by Robert Lewis, written by Lew Hunter, and stars Melinda Dillon, Richard Masur, Dana Hill, and Ronny Cox. It is a Green/Epstein Production in association with Columbia Pictures Television. The film received a Primetime Emmy Award nomination for Outstanding Drama Special, and won a Young Artist Award for star Hill in the category of Best Young Actress.

After its initial airing on CBS, it was released on VHS by RCA/Columbia Pictures Home Video in 1983, and aired occasionally via syndication and cable television into the mid-1990s.

== Production ==
The screenplay for Fallen Angel was written by Lew Hunter, and went through fourteen rewrites. Jim Green, arguing that he "did not want to make this film [and] CBS asked [us] to make it," was focused on avoiding sensationalism common in too many television films.

== Plot ==
As the film opens, a young girl named Michelle refuses to perform for a child pornography film shot by pedophile Howard "Howie" Nichols. The director, Dennis, dumps Michelle and threatens to blow the whistle on the operation if Howard does not find a more cooperative actress. On the side, he is a coach for the girls' softball team at the rec center. Meanwhile, 12-year-old Jennifer Phillips, a recent elementary school graduate and aspiring gymnast, is struggling to communicate with her mother and working waitress Sherry following the death of her father, unable to accept her mother's new boyfriend (who was also her father's co-worker), Frank Dawson.

Jennifer encounters Howard posting ads for the softball team at a video arcade, beginning a series of secret conversations between the two. They involve Howard snapping Polaroid photos of Jennifer, comparing her looks to other actresses such as Farrah Fawcett and Raquel Welch, and nicknaming her "Angel." He provides her ice cream, a teddy bear, and a puppy named Fred. He also promises prints of her, "like a real movie star". At a shoot near the lake, Howard asks her to lift her knee-length skirt and "show a little skin" while posing. When she proves reluctant to do so, Howard attempts to explain to her about "the beauty of the human body", even showing her some pornographic magazines, but then backs off.

Howard arranges for Jennifer to come to the house where Dennis does his filming. After a brief meeting, Dennis realizes she's exactly what he's looking for, but Howard attempts to stop him, wanting Jennifer all to himself. However, Dennis reiterates his threat to tip off the authorities and make Howard the fall guy, and Howard backs off. Jennifer is then teamed with a boy about her age named David, and the two start out posing for a variety of fairly innocent shots (mostly depicting the pair kissing and cuddling). However, during a shoot at the lake, Howard asks them to pose nude. A seasoned veteran, David cooperates, but Jennifer refuses. Using manipulative tactics, such as threatening to send Fred back to the pound and giving her a spiked beverage to calm her nerves, a tearful Jennifer reluctantly complies.

Frank spots her in a kiddie porn magazine ad that some "idiot sheet metal guys" had on one of his stops, which he informs Sherry of. Jennifer denies everything when confronted before running away from home. Howard provides her a place to stay, an apartment room that also has three young male stars up. Upon returning home, Sherry finds her daughter's goodbye letter, in which Jennifer admits to having been the girl in the magazine ad.

She begins searching adult establishments and popular hangouts in the area. Later, she goes to the rec center, where Howard feigns surprise over Jennifer's disappearance and absence at that evening's ballgame. Howard goes back to the apartment to seduce Jennifer. However, he is halted by Sherry, who found the address via a number he had given to her earlier as his "answering service". Howard is put into custody. The prosecution wants Jennifer to testify against Howard. Despite initial skepticism from herself and Sherry, she ultimately presents her story in court, as supported by Frank.

== Cast ==
- Melinda Dillon as Sherry Philips
- Richard Masur as Howard Nichols
- Dana Hill as Jennifer Phillips
- Ronny Cox as Frank Dawson
- David Hayward as Dennis
- Virginia Kiser as Mrs. Foster
- Shelby Leverington as Jane Rizzo
- Adam Gunn as David
- Ronald G. Joseph as Lieutenant John Cooper (credited as Ron Joseph)
- David Rode as Tom
- Arthur Rosenberg as Simmons
- Sherrie Wills as Heather
- Elizabeth Cheshire as Michelle
- Tamar Cooper as Passing Customer
- Buddy Farmer as Customer
- Jamie Green as Autoraph Girl
- Holly Henderson as Karen
- Bert Hinchman as Customer
- Tom LeVasseuer as Basketball Player #1
- Carol Lippin as Julie
- Richard Lockmiller as Customer
- Dan Magiera as Counter Customer
- Ralph Meyering Jr. as Attendant
- Lawrence Moran as Basketball Player #2 (credited as Larry Moran)
- Angeline Peters as Debbie
- Persephanie Silverthorn as Carol
- Penelope Sudrow as Sharon

== Reception ==
People gave Fallen Angel a positive review, writing "Though overly long and sometimes contrived, a sober script keeps TV's latest 'issue' film from succumbing to pious voyeurism." The New York Times praised the film for being "careful and serious" in expressing its subject matter, writing that it "represents a contribution of substance to the debate that undoubtedly will continue for a long while."

== See also ==
- List of American films of 1981
