= Maxwell E. Perkins House =

Historic house in Connecticut, United States

- U.S. National Register of Historic Places
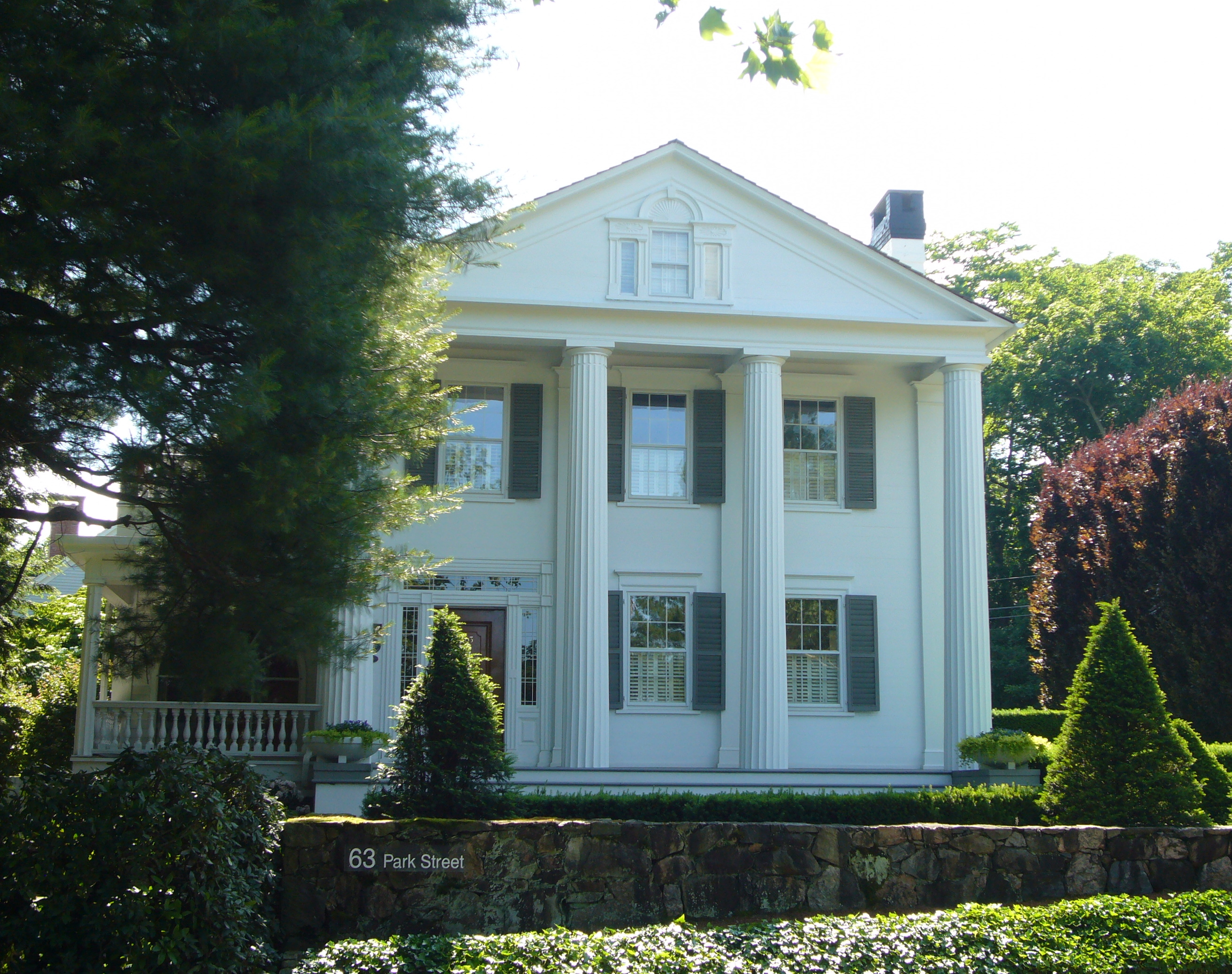

- Location within Connecticut Location within the United States
- Location: 63 Park Street, New Canaan, Connecticut
- Coordinates: 41°8′49″N 73°29′45″W
- Area: 0.3 acres (0.12 ha)
- Architect: Crissey, Hiram
- Architectural style: Greek Revival
- NRHP reference No.: 04000415
- Added to NRHP: May 06, 2004

Maxwell E. Perkins House is a historic house at 63 Park Street in New Canaan, Connecticut.

The Greek Revival house was added to the National Register of Historic Places in 2004. The house was home to Maxwell E. Perkins, the editor of Ernest Hemingway, F. Scott Fitzgerald and Thomas Wolfe.

The house was built in 1836 for Mrs. Clarinda Fitch Ayres (a widow) and her unmarried brothers. During the 19th century, the house was first a private house and then was used as a boarding house. After a period as a day school (1919–1924), the house was acquired by Maxwell E. Perkins and his wife who lived in the house with their five daughters. The house was in very poor condition by the time it was purchased by Richard and Sandra Bergmann, architects who restored the house for use both as their architectural offices and their house.

In 2019 the house was acquired by the Onera Foundation with the intention of converting the house into an architectural museum and exhibit space. The foundation hired William D. Earls, AIA as the architect for the project and hired Milton Gregory Grew, AIA as codes consultant. The design professionals prepared construction documents that were submitted for permits in early 2020.

== See also ==
- National Register of Historic Places listings in Fairfield County, Connecticut
