= South Moon Under =

1933 novel by Marjorie Kinnan Rawlings

- Title page for South Moon Under (1933)
- Author: Marjorie Kinnan Rawlings
- Publication date: 1933

South Moon Under is the first novel by Marjorie Kinnan Rawlings. It was published in 1933. It is set in the Big Scrub of Florida and depicts the "backwoods crudities" of life among Florida crackers. Depictions of gator hunting, moonshining, and childbirth are included. The title refers to a stage of the moon believed by hunters to affect animal activity. A reviewer described their distaste and revulsion "at being brought to read about the trapped “varmints” boiling for the chickens. “their bodies looking like newborn babies.” and found the novel to be more unvarnished ethnography than an appealing work of fiction. The book offers a depiction of uncouth pioneer life in the wilds of Florida. Kirkus Reviews stated, "Here is realism without sordidness, poetry and rhythm and a tenderness that never once verges on sentimentality."

Rawlings and her husband moved from Rochester to live in the wilds of Florida for several years before it was published. They divorced after it was published. The book was a finalist for the Pulitzer Prize. Rawlings subsequently won the prize for her acclaimed 1938 book The Yearling. It was adapted to film.
