= Marjorie Kinnan Rawlings =

American novelist (1896–1953)

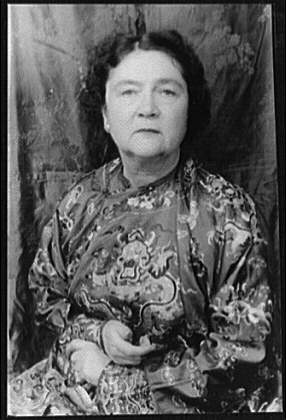
- Rawlings in 1953
- Born: Marjorie Kinnan; August 8, 1896; Washington, D.C., U.S.
- Died: December 14, 1953 (aged 57); St. Augustine, Florida, U.S.
- Education: University of Wisconsin, Madison (BA)
- Occupation: Writer
- Spouses: Charles Rawlings (m. 1919; div. 1933) Norton Baskin (m. 1941)
- Writing career
- Period: 1928–1953
- Genres: Fiction, Florida history

Marjorie Kinnan Rawlings (August 8, 1896 – December 14, 1953) was an American writer who lived in rural Florida and wrote novels with rural themes and settings. Her best known work, The Yearling—about a boy who adopts an orphaned fawn—won a Pulitzer Prize for Fiction in 1939 and was later made into a movie of the same name. The book was written before the concept of young adult fiction arose but is now commonly included in teen reading lists.

== Early life and education ==
Kinnan was born in 1896 in Washington, D.C., the daughter of Ida May (née Traphagen) and Arthur Frank Kinnan, an attorney for the U.S. Patent Office. She grew up in the Brookland neighborhood and was interested in writing as early as age six; she submitted stories to the children's sections of newspapers until she was 16. At age 15, she entered into a contest a story titled "The Reincarnation of Miss Hetty", for which she won a prize.

She attended the University of Wisconsin–Madison, where she joined Kappa Alpha Theta sorority and received a degree in English in 1918. She was selected as a member of the local senior women's honor society on campus, which in 1920 became a chapter of the national senior women's society, Mortar Board. She met Charles Rawlings while working for the school literary magazine, and married him in 1919. Kinnan briefly worked for the YWCA editorial board in New York City. The couple moved to Louisville, Kentucky, where they both wrote for the Courier Journal, and then to Rochester, New York, where they wrote for the Rochester Journal-American and where Marjorie wrote a syndicated column called "Songs of the Housewife".

In 1928, with a small inheritance from her mother, the Rawlings purchased a 72-acre (290,000 m^{2}) orange grove near Hawthorne, Florida, in a settlement named Cross Creek for its location between Orange Lake and Lochloosa Lake. She brought the area to international fame through her writing. She was fascinated with the remote wilderness and the lives of Cross Creek residents, her Florida cracker neighbors, and felt a profound and transforming connection to the region and the land. Wary at first, the local residents soon warmed to her and opened up their lives and experiences to her. Marjorie actually made many visits to meet with Calvin and Mary Long to observe their family relationships. This relationship ended up being used as a model for the family in her most successful novel, The Yearling. The Longs lived in a clearing named Pat's Island, but Marjorie renamed the clearing "Baxter's Island." Marjorie filled several notebooks with descriptions of the animals, plants, Southern dialect, and recipes, and she used these descriptions in her writings.

== Career ==
=== Author and writer ===
Encouraged by her editor at Scribner's, Maxwell Perkins, who was impressed by the letters she wrote him about her life in Cross Creek, Rawlings began writing stories set in the nearby Big Scrub. In 1930, Scribner's accepted two of her stories, "Cracker Chidlings" and "Jacob's Ladder", both about the poor, backcountry Florida residents who were quite similar to her neighbors at Cross Creek. Local reception to her stories was mixed between puzzlement concerning about whom she was writing, and rage—one mother apparently recognized her son as a subject in a story and threatened to whip Rawlings until she was dead.

Her first novel, South Moon Under, was published in 1933. The book captures the richness of the Big Scrub and its environs in telling the story of a young man, Lant, who must support himself and his mother by making and selling moonshine, and what he must do when a traitorous cousin threatens to turn him in. Moonshiners are the subject of several of her stories, and Rawlings lived with a moonshiner for several weeks near Ocala, Florida, to prepare for writing the book. South Moon Under was included in the Book of the Month Club and was a finalist for the Pulitzer Prize for Fiction. That same year, she and her husband Charles were divorced; living in rural Florida did not appeal to him. One of her least well-received books, Golden Apples, came out in 1935. It tells the stories of several people who suffer from unrequited love from people unsuited for them. Rawlings was disappointed in it, and in a 1935 letter to her publisher Max Perkins, she called it "interesting trash instead of literature."

She found immense success in 1938 with The Yearling (also set in the Big Scrub), a story about a Florida boy and his pet deer and his relationship with his father, which she originally intended as a story for young readers. It was selected for the Book of the Month Club, and it won the Pulitzer Prize for Fiction in 1939. MGM purchased the rights to the film version which was released in 1946, and it made her famous. In 1942, Rawlings published Cross Creek, an autobiographical account of her relationships with her neighbors and her beloved Florida hammocks. Cross Creek also was chosen by the Book of the Month Club and was released in an armed services edition (D-112), which was sent to servicemen during World War II. In addition The Yearling (B-55 and S-33) and South Moon Under (724) were published in the Armed Services Editions series.

Rawlings's final novel, The Sojourner—published in 1953 and set in the north—was about the life of a man and his relationship to his family: a difficult mother who favors her other, first-born son and his relationship to this absent older brother. To absorb the natural setting so vital to her writing, she bought an old farmhouse in Van Hornesville, New York, and spent part of each year there until her death. The novel was less well-received critically than her Florida writings and did little to enhance her literary reputation. She published 33 short stories from 1912 to 1949. As many of Rawlings's works were centered in the northern and central Florida area, she was often considered a regional writer. Rawlings rejected this label saying, "I don't hold any brief for regionalism, and I don't hold with the regional novel as such … don't make a novel about them unless they have a larger meaning than just quaintness."

=== Invasion of privacy case ===
In 1943, Rawlings faced a libel suit for Cross Creek, filed by her neighbor Zelma Cason, whom Rawlings had met the first day she moved to Florida. Cason had helped to soothe the mother made upset by her son's depiction in "Jacob's Ladder". Cason claimed Rawlings made her out to be a "hussy". Rawlings had assumed their friendship was intact and spoke with her immediately. Cason went ahead with the lawsuit seeking $100,000 for invasion of privacy (as the courts found libel too ambiguous). It was a cause of action that had never been argued in a Florida court.

Rawlings used Cason's forename in the book but described her in this passage:

Zelma is an ageless spinster resembling an angry and efficient canary. She manages her orange grove and as much of the village and county as needs management or will submit to it. I cannot decide whether she should have been a man or a mother. She combines the more violent characteristics of both and those who ask for or accept her ministrations think nothing at being cursed loudly at the very instant of being tenderly fed, clothed, nursed, or guided through their troubles.

Cason was represented by Kate Walton, one of the first female attorneys in Florida. Cason was reportedly profane indeed (one of her neighbors reported her swearing could be heard for a quarter of a mile), wore pants, had a fascination with guns, and was just as extraordinarily independent as Rawlings. Rawlings won the case and enjoyed a brief vindication, but the verdict was overturned in appellate court, and Rawlings was ordered to pay damages in the amount of one dollar. The toll the case took on Rawlings was great, in both time (five years) and emotion. Reportedly, Rawlings had been shocked to learn of Cason's reaction to the book and felt betrayed. After the case was over, she spent less time in Cross Creek and never wrote another book about Florida, though she had been considering doing a sequel to Cross Creek.

=== 'Geechee ===
In Cross Creek, Rawlings describes how she owns 72 acres of land and also hires several people over the years to help her with day-to-day chores and activities. An entire chapter of the book is dedicated to one woman she hires, whose name was Beatrice but who was affectionately known as "'Geechee", because the woman was ethnically part of the Ogeechee people. In the book, Rawlings says 'Geechee's mother lived in nearby Hawthorne and that 'Geechee was blind in one eye from a fight in which she had been involved. 'Geechee is employed by Rawlings on and off for nearly two years in which 'Geechee dutifully makes life easier for Rawlings.

'Geechee reveals to Rawlings that her boyfriend named Leroy was serving time in prison for manslaughter and asks Rawlings for help in gaining his release. She arranges for Leroy to be paroled to her and come work for her farm, and she has a wedding on the grounds for Beatrice and Leroy. After a few weeks, Leroy aggressively demands more earnings from Rawlings and threatens her. She decides he must leave, which causes her distress because she does not want 'Geechee to go with him. 'Geechee eventually decides to stay with Rawlings but then begins to drink heavily and abandons her. Weeks later, Rawlings searches for 'Geechee, finds her, and drives her back to the farm, describing 'Geechee as a "Black Florence Nightingale". 'Geechee is unable to stop herself from drinking, which leads a heartbroken Rawlings to dismiss her. Rawlings states in her autobiography "No maid of perfection—and now I have one—can fill the strange emptiness she left in a remote corner of my heart. I think of her often, and I know she does of me, for she comes once a year to see me".

When Cross Creek was turned into a 1983 film, actress Alfre Woodard was nominated for the Academy Award for Best Supporting Actress for her performance as 'Geechee.

== Personal life ==
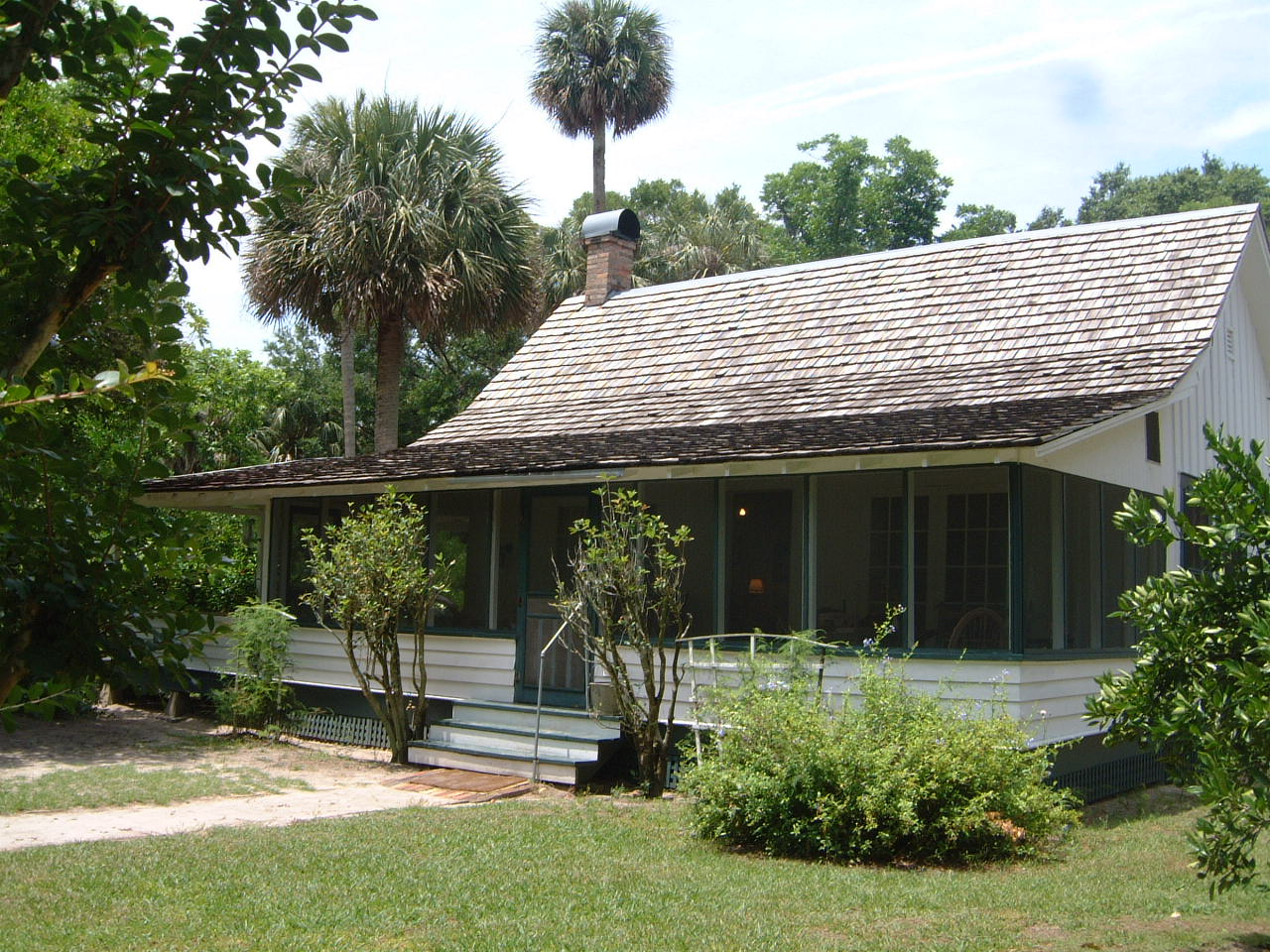
Rawlings's home at Marjorie Kinnan Rawlings Historic State Park in Cross Creek, Florida

She met Charles Rawlings while working for the University of Wisconsin–Madison literary magazine, and married him in 1919. They moved to Louisville, Kentucky to work for the Louisville Courier-Journal. They moved to Rochester, New York. In 1933, Marjorie's marriage to Charles ended in divorce.

With the money she made from The Yearling, Rawlings bought a beach cottage at Crescent Beach, ten miles south of St. Augustine. In 1941, Rawlings married Ocala hotelier Norton Baskin (1901–1997), and he remodeled an old mansion into the Castle Warden Hotel in St. Augustine, which currently houses the Ripley's Believe it or Not Museum. After World War II, he sold the hotel and managed the Dolphin Restaurant at Marineland, which was then Florida's number one tourist attraction. Rawlings and Baskin made their primary home at Crescent Beach, and they continued their respective occupations independently. When a visitor to the Castle Warden Hotel suggested she saw the influence of Rawlings in the decor, Baskin protested, saying, "You do not see Mrs. Rawlings' fine hand in this place. Nor will you see my big foot in her next book. That's our agreement. She writes. I run a hotel." After purchasing her land in New York, Rawlings spent half the year there and half the year with Baskin in St. Augustine.

Her singular admitted vanity was cooking. She said, "I get as much satisfaction from preparing a perfect dinner for a few good friends as from turning out a perfect paragraph in my writing." Rawlings befriended and corresponded with Mary McLeod Bethune and Zora Neale Hurston. Hurston visited her at Cross Creek. Despite Rawlings resisting many of the social norms of the time, she still refused to allow Hurston, an African-American, to sleep in her home the first time that Hurston visited in 1940; instead Hurston was relegated to the tenant house to sleep. Rawlings felt so much guilt about this that, when Hurston visited again the following year, Rawlings offered her the guest bedroom in her home. While some of Rawlings's views on race relations were very different from her neighbors', she also infantilized African Americans, along with white Southerners, while simultaneously labeling the economic differences between African Americans and whites "a scandal”. She considered whites superior. She described her African-American employee Idella as "the perfect maid". Their relationship is described in the book Idella: Marjorie Rawlings' "Perfect Maid", by Idella Parker and Mary Keating.

Biographers have noted her longing for a male child through her writings, as far back as her first story as a teenage girl in "The Reincarnation of Miss Hetty", and repeated throughout several works, letters, and characters, most notably in The Yearling. In fact, she stated that as a child she had a gift for telling stories but that she demanded all her audiences be boys. Her hatred of cities was intense: she wrote a sonnet titled, "Having Left Cities Behind Me" published in Scribner's in 1938 to illustrate it (excerpt):

Now, having left cities behind me, turned
Away forever from the strange, gregarious
Huddling of men by stones, I find those various
Great towns I knew fused into one, burned
Together in the fire of my despising ...

She was criticized throughout her career for being uneven with her talent in writing, something she recognized in herself, and that reflected periods of depression and heavy drinking, leading to and exacerbating her artistic frustration. She has been described as having unique sensibilities; she wrote of feeling "vibrations" from the land and often preferred long periods of solitude at Cross Creek. She was known for being remarkably strong-willed, but after her death, Norton Baskin wrote of her: "Marjorie was the shyest person I have ever known. This was always strange to me as she could stand up to anybody in any department of endeavor but time after time when she was asked to go some place or to do something she would accept—'if I would go with her.'"

=== Death and legacy ===
Rawlings died on December 14, 1953, in St. Augustine of a cerebral hemorrhage most likely brought on by her untreated alcoholism and chain smoking. She bequeathed most of her property to the University of Florida in Gainesville, where she taught creative writing in Anderson Hall. In return, her name was given to a dormitory dedicated in 1958 as Rawlings Hall. Her land at Cross Creek is now the Marjorie Kinnan Rawlings Historic State Park. Baskin survived her by 44 years, passing away in 1997. They are buried side by side at Antioch Cemetery near Island Grove, Florida. Her tombstone, with Baskin's inscription, reads: "Through her writing she endeared herself to the people of the world."

Rawlings' reputation has managed to outlive those of many of her contemporaries. A posthumously published children's book, The Secret River, won a Newbery Honor in 1956, and movies were made long after her death of Gal Young Un and Cross Creek (Baskin made a cameo appearance in Cross Creek as a man sitting in a rocking chair). In 1986, Rawlings was inducted into the Florida Women's Hall of Fame. In 1989 she won the Florida Folk Heritage Award. In 2008, the United States Postal Service unveiled a stamp bearing Rawlings's image. She was named a Great Floridian in 2009; the program honors persons who made “major contributions to the progress and welfare" of Florida.

Several public schools in Florida have been named in her honor, including Rawlings Elementary School in Gainesville, PVPV/Rawlings Elementary School in Ponte Vedra Beach and Marjorie Kinnan Rawlings Elementary in Pinellas Park.

== Works ==
Short stories

- 1912 "The Reincarnation of Miss Hetty"
- 1931 "Cracker Chidlins"
- 1931 "Jacob's Ladder" (contained in When the Whippoorwill [1940])
- 1931 "A Plumb Care Conscience" (contained in When the Whippoorwill [1940])
- 1932 "A Crop of Beans" (contained in When the Whippoorwill [1940])
- 1932 "Gal Young Un" (O. Henry Award First Prize for 1932) (contained in When the Whippoorwill [1940])
- 1933 "Hyacinth Drift"
- 1933 "Alligators" (contained in When the Whippoorwill [1940])
- 1933 "Benny and the Bird Dogs" (contained in When the Whippoorwill [1940])
- 1934 "The Pardon" (contained in When the Whippoorwill [1940])
- 1936 "A Mother in Mannville" (contained in When the Whippoorwill [1940])
- 1936 "Varmints" (contained in When the Whippoorwill [1940])
- 1938 "Mountain Rain"
- 1939 "I Sing While I Cook" (nonfiction)
- 1939 "Cocks Must Crow" (contained in When the Whippoorwill [1940])
- 1940 "The Pelican's Shadow"
- 1940 "The Enemy" (contained in When the Whippoorwill [1940])
- 1941 "Jessamine Springs"
- 1941 "The Provider"
- 1942 "Fanny, You Fool!"
- 1944 "Shell"
- 1945 "Black Secret"
- 1945 "Miriam's Houses" (6-part series based on "A Mother in Mannville")
- 1940 "In The Heart"

Novels and story collections

- 1928 Blood of My Blood
- 1933 South Moon Under
- 1935 Golden Apples
- 1938 The Yearling (adapted to film in 1946) (Pulitzer Prize for Fiction in 1939)
- 1940 When the Whippoorwill
- 1942 Cross Creek (adapted to film in 1983)
- 1942 Cross Creek Cookery
- 1947 "Mountain Prelude" (adapted to film as The Sun Comes Up in 1950)
- 1950 Jacob's Ladder
- 1953 The Sojourner
- 1955 The Secret River (Newbery Honor in 1956)

== See also ==
- Florida literature
