= Cross Creek, Florida =

Unincorporated community in Florida, U.S.

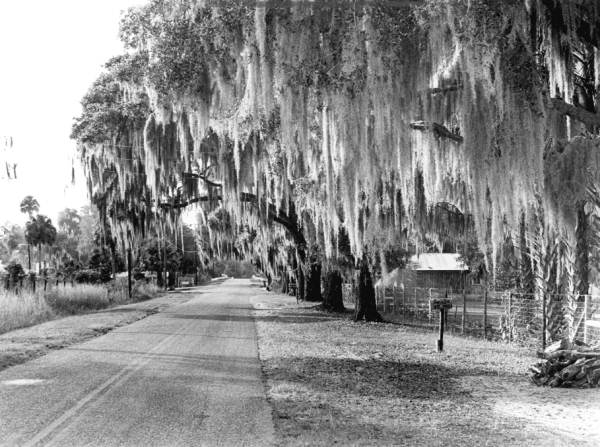
Cross Creek, Florida, 1965

Cross Creek is an unincorporated community in Alachua County, Florida, United States. It is located on Cross Creek, a short stream connecting Orange and Lochloosa lakes.

== Geography ==
Cross Creek is located at 29°29′11″N 82°09′42″W. The community is situated in the extreme southeastern corner of Alachua County and is approximately 20 miles southeast of the county seat, Gainesville, and 24 miles north of Ocala in Marion County. It is bisected by a navigable waterway, Cross Creek, which connects the two large lakes of Orange and Lochloosa; thus the community is on a narrow isthmus between the two bodies of water.

== History ==
Cross Creek is well known as the home of the author Marjorie Kinnan Rawlings. She wrote four of her books while living there, including the Pulitzer Prize-winning novel, The Yearling, which was adapted as the 1946 film of the same name, and her memoir, Cross Creek, which was adapted as the 1983 film.

Cross Creek was settled in the 19th century. Rawlings' house may have been built in the 1880s. She reported that Cross Creek was home to just seven families, five white and two black, when she moved there in 1928. The roads were unpaved and there was no electrical power or ice available. Electrical power lines reached Cross Creek in 1948.

The road through Cross Creek (Alachua County Road 325), was paved about the same time after World War II. The road to Micanopy, the River Styx Road (Alachua County Road 346), was not paved until 1962. The population of Cross Creek grew during the 1950s and 1960s when Ben Wheeler, a resident, dug canals and built a number of houses many with waterfronts. A number of people moved into "The Creek" from other areas including the northern United States. As a result the 'cracker' character of "The Creek" was permanently altered. By the late twentieth century the community would have been nearly unrecognizable to Rawlings. The unique geographical environs and the presence of a few older houses (including Rawlings' home, now both a Florida state park and a National Historic Site), have helped Cross Creek retain its historic integrity.

== Education ==
The nearest public high school and elementary school are in Hawthorne, 15 miles to the northeast. There is a charter school in Micanopy, nine miles southwest.
