= The Yearling =

1938 novel by Marjorie Kinnan Rawlings

- Cover of original 1938 edition
- Author: Marjorie Kinnan Rawlings
- Illustrator: Edward Shenton
- Language: English
- Genre: Young adult novel
- Publisher: Charles Scribner's Sons
- Publication date: 1938; 88 years ago
- Publication place: United States
- Media type: Print (hardback & paperback)
- Pages: 416 (mass market paperback)
- Preceded by: South Moon Under
- Followed by: Cross Creek

The Yearling is a novel by American writer Marjorie Kinnan Rawlings, published in March 1938. It was the main selection of the Book of the Month Club in April 1938. It won the 1939 Pulitzer Prize for the Novel.

It was the best-selling novel in the United States in 1938, when it sold more than 250,000 copies. It was the seventh-best seller in 1939. The book has been translated into Spanish, Chinese, French, Japanese, German, Italian, Russian, and 22 other languages.

Rawlings's editor was Maxwell Perkins, who also worked with F. Scott Fitzgerald, Ernest Hemingway, and other literary luminaries. She had submitted several projects to Perkins for his review, and he rejected them all. He advised her to write about what she knew from her own life, and The Yearling was the result.

== Plot ==
Young Jody Baxter lives with his parents, Ora and Ezra "Penny" Baxter, on a small farm in the backwoods of the Big Scrub in Florida in the years following the Civil War. His parents had six other children before him, but they died in infancy. His mother has difficulty bonding with the boy. Jody loves the outdoors and his family. He has wanted a pet for as long as he can remember, but his mother says that they barely have enough food to feed themselves, let alone a pet. Jody's family is neighbors with another, the Forresters. While the Forresters are presented as Florida crackers and a disreputable clan, and the families often fight, the disabled youngest Forrester brother, Fodder-Wing, is a close friend to Jody.

A subplot involves the hunt for an old bear named Slewfoot that randomly attacks the Baxter livestock. Eventually, the Baxters and the rowdy Forresters get in a fight about the bear. At one point, Jody visits the home of a beloved family friend who lives in Volusia whom he refers to as Grandma Hutto. While there, Hutto's son, a sailor named Oliver, gets into a fight with one of the Forresters, Lem, over Oliver's girlfriend, Twink Weatherby. Later, the Forresters steal the Baxters' hogs. While Jody and Penny are out searching for the stolen stock, Penny is bitten in the arm by a rattlesnake. Penny shoots a doe, in order to use its liver to draw out the snake's venom. This saves Penny's life but leaves an orphaned fawn.

Jody convinces his parents to allow him to adopt the fawn and it becomes his constant companion. He goes to Fodder-wing's house and learns that Fodder-wing has died, but the Forrester boy thought that "Flag" would be a good name for a deer. Soon after Jody adopts Flag, a catastrophic flood hits the scrub and destroys much of the family's crops. When the flood is over, a plague kills many of the scrub animals. With the help of the Forresters, the Baxters slowly recover from these events. As the family is preparing for Christmas, Slewfoot returns and kills one of their calves. Jody and Penny kill Slewfoot, then head to a Christmas party at their church, which the Forresters also attend. At the Christmas party, the Forresters learn that Oliver and Twink have married, prompting Lem to burn down Grandma Hutto's house. Grandma Hutto, Oliver, and Twink all move to Boston.

Flag continues to grow and becomes more destructive. When he eats the family's corn crop, Jody's parents order him to build a large fence or get rid of Flag, and Jody chooses the former. However, this fence fails and Flag eats the corn a second time. Penny, who is sick with rheumatism, orders Jody to shoot Flag since the deer's actions are endangering the family, but Jody cannot bring himself to do this. Ora then shoots Flag but fails to kill him, forcing Jody to shoot Flag a second time. In blind fury, Jody runs away and attempts to reach Boston using a broken-down canoe, but he quickly begins to starve. A group of sailors from a mail ship rescue Jody and return him to Volusia.

When Jody returns home, he is warmly welcomed by Penny, who remarks that Jody is no longer a child. Jody resolves to take on more responsibilities on the farm.

== Characters ==
- Ezra "Penny" Baxter was raised by a stern minister who allowed no leisure or slacking. He treats his son Jody generously because of his own upbringing. He served in the Confederate army during the Civil War. Nicknamed "Penny" by Lem Forrester because of his diminutive size.
- Ora Baxter: Jody's mother. She is introduced on page 20 as "Ora." Penny calls her "Ory". She is often called "Ma" or "Ma Baxter".
- Jody Baxter: The son of Ora and Penny Baxter.
- Flag: Jody's pet fawn.
- The Forresters: (Pa and Ma Forrester, Buck, Mill-Wheel, Arch, Lem, Gabby, Pack, Fodder-wing) A family that lives near the Baxters. Though Ora dislikes them strongly, they are friends of Penny and Jody. However, there is occasional conflict between them and the Baxters. Of the Forresters, Lem is the most antagonistic towards the Baxters, while Buck is helpful and honest.
- Fodder-wing Forrester: Jody's best friend. He is crippled and was born with a hunched frame. He is thought to be rather peculiar, but has a great fondness for animals.
- Julia: Hound dog owned by the Baxters. She is treasured by Penny but distrusts Jody.
- Rip: Bulldog owned by the Baxters.
- Perk: Feist dog owned originally by the Baxters but traded to the Forresters for a new gun later in the novel.
- Doc Wilson: An often-drunk acquaintance of Penny and physician.
- Grandma Hutto: a native of Volusia with whom Penny and Jody are on excellent terms, though the exact nature of their relationship is unclear. Grandma Hutto is the mother of the sailor Oliver, one of Jody's heroes. Her house is burned down by the Forresters, and she departs with her son to Boston.
- Oliver Hutto: a role model for Jody. He nevertheless provokes Jody's ire when he elects to visit his sweetheart Twink Weatherby instead of staying to tell stories about his time as a sailor. He gets in a fight with Lem Forrester over the girl and is badly beaten. He ends up marrying Twink Weatherby.
- Twink Weatherby: a yellow-haired beauty from Volusia. She is claimed by both Lem Forrester and Oliver Hutto, but marries Oliver. Jody initially hates Twink for taking Oliver from him, but begins to change his mind when she gives him a kiss.

== Adaptations ==
The novel was adapted into a film of the same name in 1946, starring Gregory Peck as Penny Baxter and Jane Wyman as Ora Baxter. Both were nominated for Oscars for their performances. Claude Jarman Jr. as Jody Baxter won the Juvenile Award Oscar.

In 1949, Claude Pascal adapted the film into a newspaper comic, under its French title Jody et le Faon (Jody and the Fawn).

A Broadway musical adaption with music by Michael Leonard and lyrics by Herbert Martin was produced by Lore Noto in 1965 at the Alvin Theatre. The musical's book was by Noto and Herbert Martin. David Wayne and Delores Wilson played Ezra and Ora Baxter, and David Hartman was Oliver Hutto. The show played only three performances.

Barbra Streisand recorded four songs from the show: "I'm All Smiles", "The Kind of Man A Woman Needs", "Why Did I Choose You?", and "My Pa".

A Japanese animated version was released in 1983.

The 1983 film Cross Creek, about Rawlings and the incident that inspired the novel, starred Mary Steenburgen, Rip Torn, Peter Coyote and Dana Hill.

A 1994 television adaptation starred Peter Strauss as Ezra Baxter, Jean Smart as Ora Baxter, and Philip Seymour Hoffman as Buck.

A 2012 song by singer/songwriter Andrew Peterson, "The Ballad of Jody Baxter", deals with themes from The Yearling. The song is on his album Light for the Lost Boy.

== Notes ==
The Long homestead in the book and the film's shooting location are now part of the Ocala National Forest. Visitors can hike the Yearling Trail and pass the sites where the homes were and the now dry sinkhole, and pay respects at the Long Family Cemetery.
