= Keeper of the Register =

United States federal official involved in historic preservation

The Keeper of the Register (more formally known as the Keeper of the National Register of Historic Places) is a National Park Service (NPS) official, responsible for deciding on the eligibility of historic properties for inclusion on the U.S. National Register of Historic Places (NRHP).

The Keeper of the Register role was created following the 1966 enactment of the National Historic Preservation Act (NHPA). The NHPA declared a national policy focus on preserving significant historic sites, and it has been amended several times since it was first enacted. The NHPA authorized the Secretary of the Interior to maintain a National Register of Historic Places, which has been delegated to the Keeper by the Director of the National Park Service.

The first person to hold the office was William J. Murtagh, whose term ran from 1967 through 1979. The Keeper's authority may be delegated as they see fit. The State Historic Preservation Officer for each state submits nominations to the Keeper. Upon receipt, the Keeper has 45 days to decide whether to add the property to the NRHP.

The Keeper of the Register role is supported by several regional reviewers, who review submissions for inclusion on the NHRP. This team also is supported by several archaeologists, archivists, and historians.

== List of Keepers ==
#	Keeper	Term	Appointing Director	Notes
1	William J. Murtagh	1967 – 1979	George B. Hartzog Jr.	
Acting	Carol D. Shull	1979 – 1981	William J. Whalen III	
2	Jerry L. Rogers	1981 – 1994	Russell E. Dickenson	
3	Carol D. Shull	1994 - 2005	Roger G. Kennedy	
4	Jan Snyder Matthews	2005 – 2009	Fran P. Mainella	
Interim	Carol D. Shull	2009 – January 3, 2015	Mary A. Bomar	
5	Stephanie Toothman	January 4, 2015 – June 2, 2017	Jonathan Jarvis	
6	J. Paul Loether	June 3, 2017 – June 25, 2018	Michael T. Reynolds	
7	Joy Beasley	July 2018 – Present	P. Daniel Smith	NPS Associate Director of Cultural Resources, Partnerships, and Science
