= History of the National Register of Historic Places =

The history of the National Register of Historic Places began in 1966 when the United States government passed the National Historic Preservation Act (NHPA), which created the National Register of Historic Places (NRHP). Upon its inception, the U.S. National Park Service (NPS) became the lead agency for the Register. The Register has continued to grow through two reorganizations, one in the 1970s and another in the 1980s. In 1978 the NRHP was completely transferred away from the National Park Service, it was again transmitted to the NPS in 1981.

== Early years ==
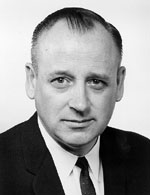
George B. Hartzog Jr., director of the National Park Service from January 8, 1964, until December 31, 1972.

In April 1966, six months before the National Register of Historic Places was created, the National Park Service's history research programs had been centralized into the office of Robert M. Utley, NPS chief historian, in Washington, D.C., as part of an overall plan dubbed "Mission 66." On October 15, 1966, the Historic Preservation Act created the National Register of Historic Places and the corresponding State Historic Preservation Offices. Initially the National Register consisted of those National Historic Landmarks designated before the Register's creation as well as any other historic sites within the National Park system. The passage of the act, which was amended in 1980, represented the first time the United States had a broad based historic preservation policy. While the National Register did not provide specific protection to listed properties it did require federal agencies to assess the impact of activities on buildings and properties listed or eligible for listing on the NRHP. The 1966 act required those agencies to work in conjunction with the SHPO and an independent federal agency, the Advisory Council on Historic Preservation (ACHP) to confront adverse effects of federal activities on historic preservation.

Another Interior agency, the National Park Service, had past experience overseeing the Historic American Buildings Survey (1933) and the Historic Sites Survey authorized in 1935. Because of this, and the fact that the Park Service was already managing numerous historic properties within national parks, the NPS was the logical choice to head up the newly created historic preservation program. To encompass the newly created National Register of Historic Places, the National Park Service, under director George B. Hartzog Jr., created an administrative division called the Office of Archaeology and Historic Preservation (OAHP). The division oversaw several existing cultural resources programs, including the Historic Sites Survey, Utley's history division and the Historic American Buildings Survey, as well as the new NRHP and Historic Preservation Fund. Hartzog charged OAHP with creating the National Register program mandated by the 1966 law. Ernest Connally was the Office's first director and it was he who observed that American historic preservation ought be carried out, "with the informed advice and assistance of the professional and scholarly organizations of the disciplines most directly related to the endeavor; namely history, architecture, and archeology." Within OAHP new divisions were created to deal with the National Register. The first official Keeper of the Register was William J. Murtagh, an architectural historian.

In the Register's earliest years, the late 1960s and early 1970s, organization was lax and SHPO were small, understaffed and underfunded. Indeed, money was tight, but funds were still being supplied for the Historic Preservation Fund to provide matching grants-in-aid to listed property owners, first in house museums and institutional buildings but later in commercial structures as well. During this time period, the SHPO had little time to devote to serious planning, even if it wanted to; the demands of saving historic properties and building the organizations from the ground up consumed most of the early state office's resources. As a result, neither the State Historic Preservation Offices nor OAHP really took planning seriously. In 1969 Connally told Charles Lee, a State Historic Preservation Officer from South Carolina, "write a paragraph or two on each of these headings. Call it 'The Preliminary South Carolina Historic Preservation Plan.' If it makes any sense at all, I'll approve, and you can file for your brick-and-mortar projects."

== Reorganization ==
In 1973 the NPS history programs affiliated with both the U.S. National Parks system and the National Register were formally categorized into two "Assistant Directorates." Established were the Assistant Directorate for Archeology and Historic Preservation (ADAHP) and the Assistant Directorate for Park Historic Preservation (ADPHP). The Assistant Directorate for Archeology and Historic Preservation dealt with those cultural resources which were external to the National Parks system. The ADAHP included the Grants, National Register, Historical and Architectural Surveys and the Interagency Services Divisions of the Park Service. The ADPHP, on the other hand, dealt primarily with those resources associated internally with the NPS. The ADPHP included the History, Archeology and Historic Architecture Division.

== Incentives program ==
Until 1976 tax incentives were virtually non-existent for buildings on the National Register. Before 1976 the federal tax code favored new construction over the reuse of existing, sometimes historical, structures. After 1976 the tax code was altered to provide tax incentives which promote preservation of income-producing historic properties. The responsibility of ensuring that only rehabilitations that preserved the historic character of a building would qualify for the federal tax incentives fell to the National Park Service. Properties and sites listed on the Register as well as those considered contributing properties to a local historic district "approved by the Park Service" became eligible for the federal tax benefits.

Owners of properties listed on the National Register of Historic Places can be eligible for a 20% investment tax credit for the "certified rehabilitation of income-producing certified historic structures." The rehabilitation can be as commercial, industrial or residential, for rentals. The tax incentives program is operated by the Federal Historic Preservation Tax Incentives program, which is jointly managed by the National Park Service, SHPO, and the Internal Revenue Service. Aside from the 20% tax credit the tax incentive program offers a 10% tax credit for rehabilitation to owners of non-historic, non-residential buildings constructed before 1936.

The 20% tax incentive has very specific clauses indicating when it can be applied. The credit can be used for, "any project that the Secretary of the Interior designates a certified rehabilitation of a certified historic structure."

The NHPA made no distinction between properties listed on the National Register of Historic Places and those designated as National Historic Landmarks concerning qualification for tax incentives or grants. This was deliberate on the part of the 1966 act's authors, past experience had shown that categories of significance caused the lowest category to become expendable. Essentially, this reduced the Landmarks to little more than the "honor roll" of the National Register of Historic Places.

== Under the Recreation service ==
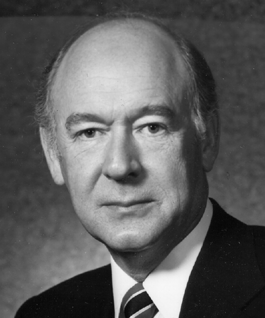
U.S. Secretary of the Interior (1977–1981) Cecil D. Andrus removed the National Register from the jurisdiction of the National Park Service in 1978.

From 1978 until 1981, under President Jimmy Carter's administration, the lead agency for the NRHP was the Heritage Conservation and Recreation Service (HCRS) within the United States Department of the Interior. The National Park Service's brief period without the Register under its auspices began in the summer of 1978 when the separation between the two directorates established in 1973 became more pronounced. Secretary of the Interior Cecil D. Andrus transferred authority over the Assistant Directorate for Archeology and Historic Preservation, which included the National Register of Historic Places, to the new Heritage Conservation and Recreation Service.

HCRS' time at the head of, essentially, all programs dealing with historic preservation formerly under the National Park Service, Bureau of Outdoor Recreation (BOR) and the National Historic Landmarks Program, was tumultuous. Carter brought in administrator Chris T. Delaporte, former head of the BOR, to lead the upstart HCRS, his assertive management style and lack of experience in historic preservation further separated state and federal entities on the topic and touched off protest from the states.

When James G. Watt was appointed to the Interior post by Ronald Reagan among his first moves was to abolish the HCRS. This move transferred the divisions under its control, then under the leadership of Jerry L. Rogers, back to the National Park Service.

== Second reorganization ==
In February 1983 the two assistant directorates, created in 1973, were merged to promote efficiency and recognize that the cultural resource programs associated with both directorates were interdependent. Rogers, described as a skilled administrator who was sensitive to the need for the NPS to work with SHPO, academia and local governments, was picked to lead this newly merged associate directorate. When the NPS had reorganized in the mid-1960s it had eliminated the positions of regional historians and chosen instead to merge those positions into Utley's Washington office. The 1983 reorganization of the directorates in control of Register activities represented a return to the organization pre-MISSION 66.

== Work with State offices ==
The NHPA established the historic preservation plan for the United States not based on a U.S. governmental model but rather on that of a highly decentralized system allowing the states to carry out activities which would allow the federal government to meet the standards of the 1966 act. Though it was not initially spelled out in the 1966 act reliance on the SHPO eventually became important as part of the process of listing properties on the National Register. The 1980 amendments to the law further laid out the responsibilities of SHPO concerning the federal Register.

By 1987 State Historic Preservation Offices existed in 57 separate jurisdictions, all fifty states and several territories. The SHPOs help make the management of the National Register and its affiliated incentive programs possible, with the states assuming much of the responsibility for monitoring rehabilitation construction on Registered Historic Places. The result is that the NPS sets standards and priorities, administers the grants program, and maintains quality control, while the SHPO carry out the work as agents of the federal government.

== Growth ==
The National Register of Historic Places has grown considerably from its beginnings as legislation in 1966. In 1986 citizens and groups nominated 3,623 separate properties, sites and districts for inclusion on the NRHP, a total of 75,000 separate properties. By 1998, including historic districts and individually listed buildings there were over 1,400,000 buildings, sites and structures listed on the Register. Each year an additional 30,000 are added. In 2021 there were over 95,000 listings in the National Register of Historic Places.
