= Robert Stanton (park director) =

Robert G. Stanton
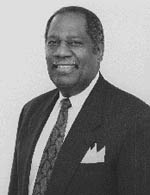

15th Director of the National Park Service
- In office August 4, 1997 – January 2001
- President: Bill Clinton
- Preceded by: Roger G. Kennedy
- Succeeded by: Fran P. Mainella

Personal details
- Born: 22 September 1940 (age 86)
- Education: Huston–Tillotson University

Robert G. "Bob" Stanton (born September 22, 1940) is a retired career civil service administrator who served for almost four decades in the United States National Park Service. He was the first African American to be appointed as the Director of the Park Service, serving 1997–2001.

== Early life and education ==
Stanton was born in Fort Worth, Texas, where he grew up in Mosier Valley, one of the oldest African-American communities in the state. He earned a B.S. in 1963 from Huston–Tillotson University, a historically black university in Austin, Texas. He did graduate work at Boston University and George Washington University.

== Career ==

Title	From	To
Seasonal Park Ranger, Grand Teton Nat'l. Park	1962	1963
Personnel Mgt./Public Information Specialist, NPS Headquarters	1966	1969
Mgt. Assistant, National Capital Parks-Central	1969	1970
Superintendent, National Capital Parks-East	8/23/1970	8/22/1971
Superintendent, Virgin Islands National Park	8/22/1971	2/1/1974
Dept. Reg. Dir., Southeast Region	4/28/1974	3/27/1976
Asst Dir., Resource Mgmt, NPS Headquarters	3/29/1976	5/15/1976
Asst Dir., Park Operations, NPS Headquarters	5/28/1977	12/31/1978
Dep. Reg.Dir., National Capital Parks	1/1/1979	6/20/1987
Assoc Dir., Park Operations, NPS Headquarters	6/21/1987	12/17/1988
Regional Director, National Capital Region	12/18/1988	1997
Director	8/4/1997	1/2001

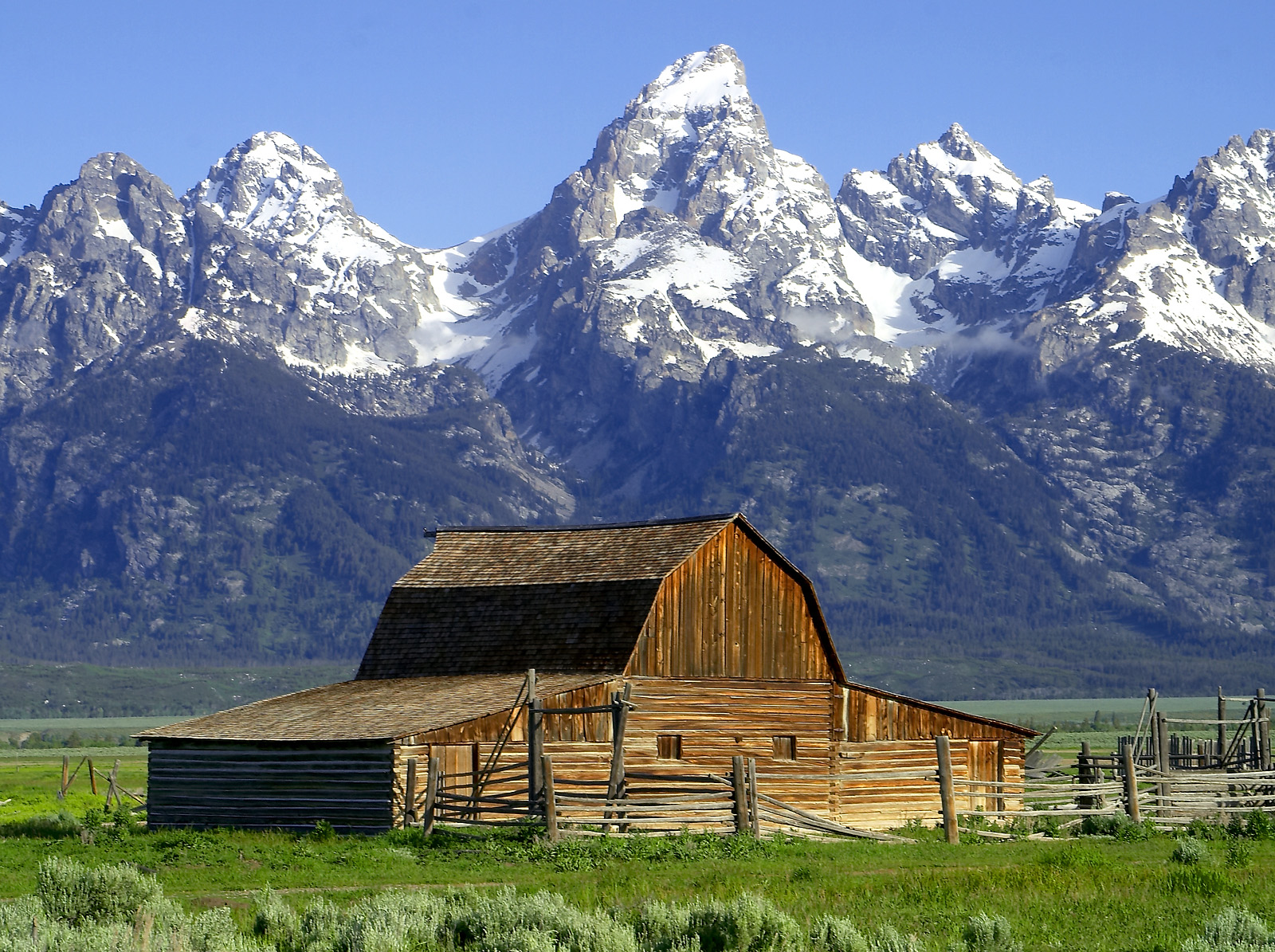
Grand Teton National Park

Stanton began his Federal career as a seasonal park ranger at Grand Teton National Park, Wyoming, during the summers of 1962 and 1963, when he was completing college.

He took a full-time position with the National Park Service in 1966, as a personnel management and public information specialist in the headquarters at Washington, D.C. In 1969, he moved to National Capital Parks-Central, as a management assistant, gaining experience in the regional operations, where many of the properties are ones of historic and cultural significance. In 1970, he was promoted to superintendent of National Capital Parks-East.

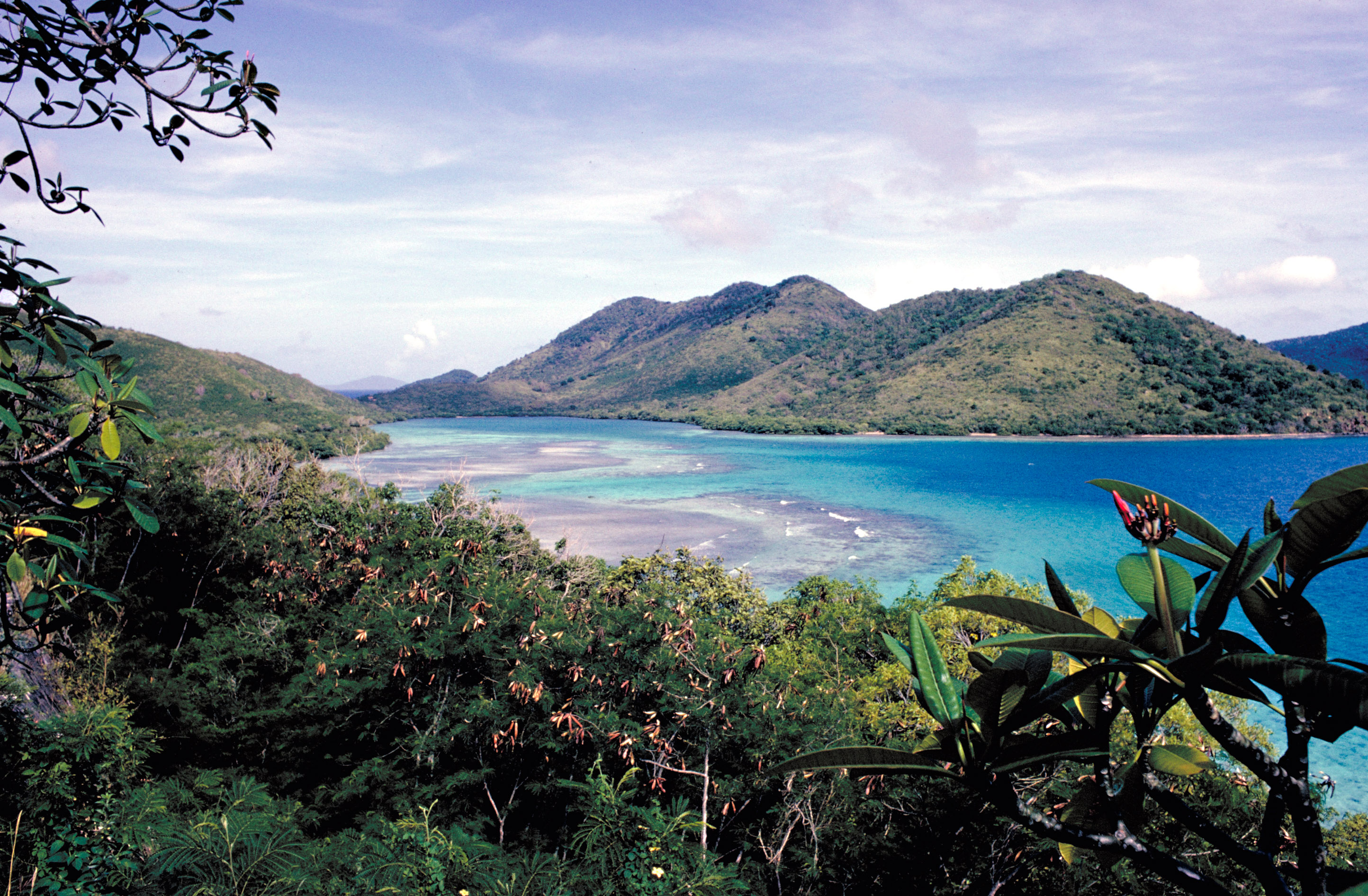
Virgin Islands National Park

In 1971, he was selected as superintendent of Virgin Islands National Park, St. Thomas, and gained experience in the Caribbean. In 1974, he was promoted to Deputy Regional Director of the Southeast Region, based in Atlanta, Georgia.

In 1976, Stanton returned to Washington, D.C., as Assistant Director, Park Operations. In 1978, he was selected as Deputy Regional Director of the National Capital Region, a position he held for eight years. In 1987, he returned to headquarters as Associate Director for Operations. In 1988, he was selected as the Regional Director of the National Capital Region, where he served until his retirement from career service in 1997. Through this period, he has expanded the NPS development of private-public partnerships to achieve goals of recognizing and protecting cultural properties, as well as expanded recognition of properties and programs recognizing contributions by minority populations.

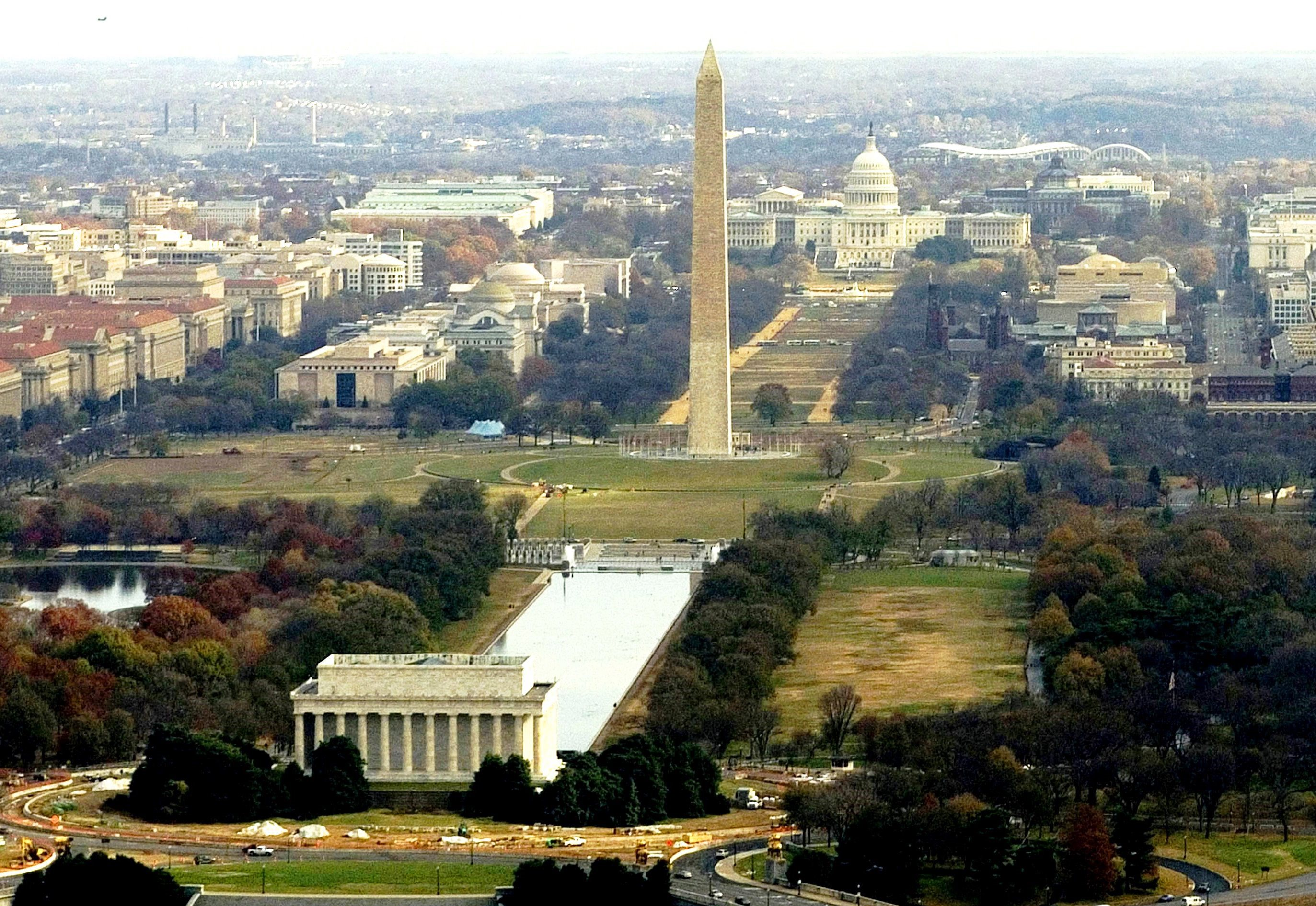
The National Mall, Washington, D.C.

The Park Service's National Capital Region of the Washington, DC metropolitan area includes many significant historic and cultural monuments, buildings and parks throughout the area, as well as having wide-ranging responsibilities for large groups of visitors, public events such as presidential inaugurations and demonstrations on the Mall, and maintenance of the White House grounds.

Shortly after his retirement, and later that same year, Stanton was called back from retirement when he was appointed as the 15th National Park Service Director by President Bill Clinton. He served from August 1997 until January 2001. Stanton was the first African American to serve as NPS Director, as well as the first career civil service employee appointed to the position since Russell E. Dickenson's term from 1980 to 1985. (Note: Roger Kennedy, Director from 1993 to 1997, had worked as an attorney with the Departments of Labor and Justice, but spent only a part of his varied career with the federal government.)

As Director, Stanton supported increasing staff diversity, as well as programs to ensure recognition of cultural and historic sites related to contributions of minority peoples in the United States. He also worked to improve the agency's public programs to better serve minority populations. Over his long NPS career, Stanton completed numerous programs in conservation, management, and executive leadership. Stanton is also an executive professor in the Department of Recreation, Park and Tourism Sciences at Texas A&M University.

== Notes ==
Government offices
Preceded by Roger G. Kennedy	Director of the National Park Service; 1997–2001	Succeeded by Fran P. Mainella
