= James M. Ridenour =

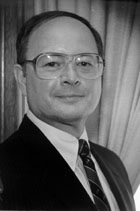

13th Director of the National Park Service
- In office April 17, 1989 – January 20, 1993
- President: George H. W. Bush
- Preceded by: William Penn Mott Jr.
- Succeeded by: Roger G. Kennedy

Personal details
- Born: January 1, 1942 (age 84) West Lafayette, Indiana

James Michael Ridenour (born January 1, 1942) was the director of the National Park Service. He served as director of the Indiana Department of Natural Resources for eight years before becoming NPS director in April 1989. Director Ridenour was not willing to accept additions to the system simply for local economic development. He spoke out against the "thinning of the blood" of the system and sought to retain the initiative from Congress in charting its expansion. He favored alternatives to full federal acquisition of proposed parklands, stressed the importance of working with other government bodies and private entities to protect lands in and outside the system, and sought to achieve a greater financial return to the NPS from park concessions. He departed with the Bush administration in January 1993.

James Ridenour of West Lafayette was a Vietnam War veteran; he served in the U.S. Army (1966–1969) as commander of a medical company in Denver, Colo., as commander of a medical detachment in Vietnam; and in Valley Forge, Pa. General Hospital, as chief of the Welfare and Recreation Branch.

== Vail Agenda ==
Director Ridenour brought together a diverse gathering of park officials, public officials, and public interest groups and individuals at Vail, Colorado in 1991. The group developed a program called the VAIL AGENDA, which laid out a program of standards to bring the Park Service into the 21st Century.

The National Park Service underwent an intensive review of its responsibilities and prospects for the future during its 75th anniversary celebration in 1991. It culminated its efforts in October 1991 with a symposium in Vail, Colo. that including several hundred participants from both within and outside the NPS. The gathering, the October 10, 1991, session of which was officially a public meeting advertised in the Federal Register of September 19, 1991, resulted in six strategic objectives and the identification of a variety of issues and recommendations, which were published in a book entitled National Parks for the 21st Century: The Vail Agenda (Library of Congress Card Number: 92-60741). Although the meeting took place during the administration of Secretary of the Interior Manuel Lujan and NPS Director James Ridenour, the Vail agenda and vision remains today as a directional tool for the NPS, with the book itself, published under the leadership of Secretary Bruce Babbitt and Director Roger Kennedy, who wrote the foreword and preface.

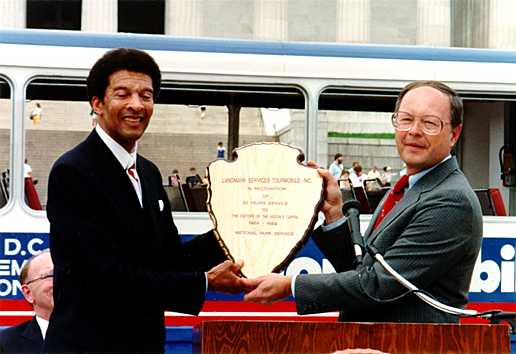
Mr. James M. Ridenour presenting a plaque to Mr. Tom Mack of Landmark Services Tourmobile, Inc.

== Suggested reading ==
James M. Ridenour, The National Parks Compromised: Pork Barrel Politics and America's Treasures (Merrillville, IN: ICS Books, 1994).

== See also ==
- National Park Service

Government offices
Preceded by William Penn Mott Jr.	Director of the National Park Service; 1989–1993	Succeeded by Roger G. Kennedy
