= William Penn Mott Jr. =

Director of the National Park Service from 1985 to 1989

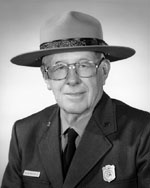

12th Director of the National Park Service
- In office May 17, 1985 – April 16, 1989
- President: Ronald Reagan
- Preceded by: Russell E. Dickenson
- Succeeded by: James M. Ridenour

Personal details
- Born: October 19, 1909 New York City, New York, U.S.
- Died: September 21, 1992 (aged 82) Orinda, California, U.S.
- Party: Republican
- Spouse: Ruth Barnes
- Education: Michigan State University; University of California, Berkeley

William Penn Mott Jr. (October 19, 1909 – September 21, 1992), was a trained landscape architect who rose to direct the California Department of Parks and Recreation and U.S. National Park Service. He earned bachelor and master degrees from Michigan State University and University of California, respectively. After graduation, he worked for the San Francisco office of the National Park Service (NPS) as a landscape architect from 1933 to 1940. He then became director of the Oakland, California Zoo. In 1962, he was hired as director of the East Bay Regional Park District until 1967. California Governor Ronald Reagan named Mott as the Director of the California Park Service in 1967, where he remained until 1985, when President Reagan named him to head the U.S. National Park Service (NPS). Mott served at the Federal level until President George H. W. Bush nominated a replacement for him in 1989. He continued to work for the NPS as a consultant until his death in 1992. His last major project was to transition the Presidio in San Francisco into a national park.

== Education and early career ==
A native of New York City, Mott enrolled at Michigan State University, where he earned a bachelor's degree in landscape architecture in 1931. He continued his education at the University of California, Berkeley, receiving a master's degree in 1933. After graduation, he spent 14 years working as a landscape architect in San Francisco. He then became superintendent of parks for Oakland, California."

== California Parks ==
=== City of Oakland ===
From 1946 to 1985 he served successively as Oakland's park superintendent, the East Bay Regional Park District's general manager, director of the California Department of Parks and Recreation under Governor Ronald Reagan.

=== East Bay Regional Park District (EBRPD) ===
Mott was hired as the general manager of EBRPD in 1962, replacing Richard Walpole, who had managed the agency from 1945 until he retired because of health issues in 1960. Wesley Adams had served as interim manager until Mott was hired.

When Mott left the agency in 1967, EBRPD's land holdings had grown from 7,000 acres (2,800 ha) to 17,000 acres (6,900 ha). The district comprised 20 parks and had an annual budget of about $12 million.

== National Park Service ==
Following his appointment as the 12th NPS director in May 1985, Mott issued a "Twelve Point Plan" to protect the parks and their resources, better serve the public, and improve the service's management. He took a strong interest in park interpretation and returned the NPS to a more expansionist posture after a near-moratorium on park additions during President Reagan's first term. When the Bush administration replaced him with its own appointee in April 1989, Mott remained on the rolls as special assistant to the western regional director overseeing planning for the Presidio of San Francisco. He died in 1992 at Orinda, California of pneumonia.

During his tenure, the NPS added 17 new facilities and 1.4×10^{6} acres (5.7×10^{3} km^{2}) of land

=== Twelve Point Plan ===
The Twelve Point Plan in 1985 was a means to "strengthen public trust, revitalize the organization and assure its continued success over time". The twelve points are:

1. Develop a Long-range Strategy to Protect our Natural, Cultural, and Recreational Resources.
2. Pursue a Creative, Expanded Land Protection Initiative
3. Stimulate and Increase our Interpretive and Visitor Service Activities for Great Public Impact
4. Share Effectively with the Public our Understanding of Critical Resource issues
5. Increase Public Understanding of the Role and Function of the National Park Service
6. Expand the Role and Involvement of Citizens and Citizen Groups at all Levels in the National Park Service
7. Seek a Better Balance Between Visitor Use and Resource Management
8. Enhance our Ability to Meet the Diverse Uses that the Public Expects in National Parks
9. Expand Career Opportunities for our Employees
10. Plan, Design, and Maintain Appropriate Park Facilities
11. Develop a Team Relationship Between Concessioners and the National Park Service
12. Foster and Encourage more Creativity, Efficiency, and Effectiveness in the Management and Administration of the National Park Service.

== Later activities and death ==
According to the New York Times, Mott served as a consultant to the NPS. His last major project was to transition the Presidio of San Francisco into a national park.

Mott died of heart failure at his home in Orinda, California on September 22, 1992, at the age of 82. His wife had died during 1981.

== See also ==
- National Park Service
- East Bay Regional Park District

Government offices
Preceded by Russell E. Dickenson	Director of the National Park Service; 1985–1989	Succeeded by James M. Ridenour
