= Ronald H. Walker =

American executive (born 1937)

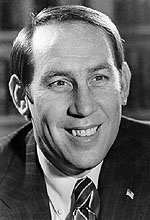

8th Director of the National Park Service
- In office January 7, 1973 – January 3, 1975
- President: Richard Nixon; Gerald Ford
- Preceded by: George B. Hartzog Jr.
- Succeeded by: Gary Everhardt

Personal details
- Born: July 25, 1937 (age 88) Bryan, Texas
- Occupation: Executive; politician

Ronald H. Walker (born July 25, 1937) is an American executive. Walker served in the administration of Presidents Richard Nixon and Gerald Ford, first as the first Director of the White House Office of Presidential Advance, and later as Director of the National Park Service (1973–1975). Walker went on to become a senior partner at Korn/Ferry International, President of the Richard Nixon Foundation, and is currently a Director Emeritus of the Board of the Nixon Foundation.

Walker was born in Bryan, Texas. He earned a degree in political sciences from the University of Arizona, served as an officer in the United States Army in Okinawa, Japan, and later became an insurance and marketing executive. A soft-spoken and affable man, Walker had been President Nixon's special assistant responsible for both domestic and international travel. As such, Walker coordinated Nixon's visit to the People's Republic of China in February 1972.

== Director of the National Park Service ==
At 36, Walker was the youngest director to hold the office and the second appointed from outside of the NPS. Lacking park experience, Walker made Russell E. Dickenson, an NPS careerist, his deputy. Walker advocated a policy of "stabilization", foreseeing that NPS funding and staffing would be inadequate for a continuing high influx of new parks and program responsibilities. Fourteen areas nevertheless joined the park system during his two years as director, including the first two national preserves. Nixon's resignation in August 1974 presaged Walker's replacement five months later.

As director, he realigned NPS regional boundaries and added North Atlantic and Rocky Mountain offices. Under Walker, the early planning was done for the Servicewide American Revolution Bicentennial activities.

The National Park Service established a plan to restructure organizationally in response to the diverse changes that have confronted it over the past several decades, to the National Performance Review, and to legally mandated personnel reductions. The resultant Restructuring Plan for the National Park Service built upon earlier efforts within the Service – the 21st Century Task Force Report, the Vail Agenda, the NPS Strategic Plan, and the Recommendations of the Reorganization Work Group – all of which have proposed significant, substantive improvements in the organization.

The plan called for the reduction of central offices and the establishment of sixteen ecological-cultural-geographical based clusters of 10-225 park units in seven regions. The first steps were taken in 1995 to begin the change. By 2000, the restructuring plan had been revised four times leaving seven regions, which were substantially smaller than before. Of the sixteen 'eco-clusters' envisioned in the plan, only those clusters based on older regional offices, i.e., Boston (Mid-Atlantic), Seattle (Pacific Northwest), and Santa Fe (Southwest) exist.

== Later life and career ==
A senior partner of Korn/Ferry International, he was the managing director for their Washington, D.C., offices. In late 2009, he came out of retirement to take up the position of the President of the Richard Nixon Foundation at the Richard Nixon Presidential Library and Museum in Yorba Linda, California. In 2010, he was promoted to Chairman of the Board of Directors, later becoming Director Emeritus.

Government offices
Preceded by George B. Hartzog Jr.	Director of the National Park Service; 1973–1975	Succeeded by Gary Everhardt
