= National Register of Historic Places =

Federal list of historic sites in the US

- Logo of the NRHP

Agency overview
- Formed: 1966; 60 years ago
- Jurisdiction: United States
- Headquarters: Main Interior Building, U.S. Department of Interior, Washington, D.C., U.S.
- Agency executive: Sherry A. Frear, Chief, National Register of Historic Places/National Historic Landmarks Program and Deputy Keeper of the National Register of Historic Places
- Parent department: National Park Service
- Website: nps.gov/nationalregister

The National Register of Historic Places (NRHP) is the United States federal government's official list of sites, buildings, structures, districts, and objects deemed worthy of preservation for their historical significance or "great artistic value".

The enactment of the National Historic Preservation Act (NHPA) in 1966 established the National Register and the process for adding properties to it. Of the more than one and a half million properties on the National Register, 100,000 are listed individually. The remainder are contributing resources within historic districts.

For most of its history, the National Register has been administered by the National Park Service (NPS), an agency within the United States Department of the Interior. Its goals are to help property owners and interest groups, such as the National Trust for Historic Preservation, to coordinate, identify and protect historic sites in the United States. While National Register listings are mostly symbolic, their recognition of significance provides some financial incentive to owners of listed properties. Protection of the property is not guaranteed. During the nomination process, the property is evaluated in terms of the four criteria for inclusion on the National Register of Historic Places. The application of those criteria has been the subject of criticism by academics of history and preservation, as well as the public and politicians. A property listed in the National Register, or located within a National Register Historic District, may qualify for tax incentives derived from the total value of expenses incurred in preserving the property.

Properties can be nominated in various forms, including individual properties, historic districts and multiple property submissions (MPS). The Register categorizes general listings into one of five types of properties: district, site, structure, building or object.

National Register Historic Districts are defined geographical areas consisting of contributing and non-contributing properties. Some properties are added automatically to the National Register when they become administered by the National Park Service. These include National Historic Landmarks (NHL), National Historic Landmark Districts (NHLD), National Historic Sites (NHS), National Historical Parks, National Military Parks, national memorials, and some national monuments.

== History ==
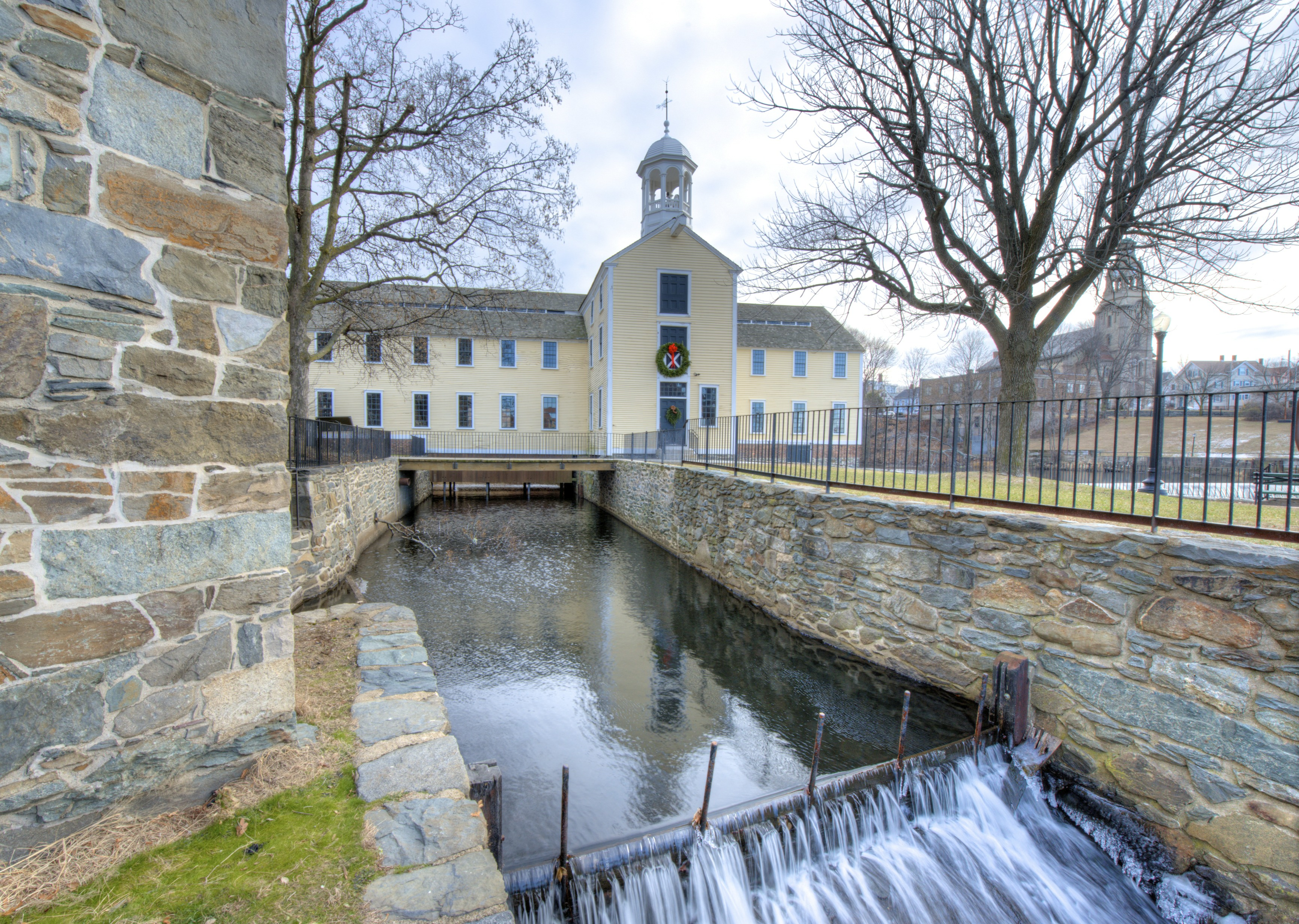
Old Slater Mill, a historic district in Pawtucket, Rhode Island, the first property listed in the National Register, on November 13, 1966

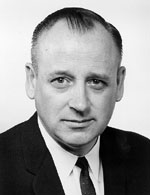
George B. Hartzog Jr., director of the National Park Service from 1964 to 1972

On October 15, 1966, the Historic Preservation Act created the National Register of Historic Places and the corresponding State Historic Preservation Offices (SHPO). The National Register initially consisted of the National Historic Landmarks designated before the Register's creation, as well as any other historic sites in the National Park System. Approval of the act, which was amended in 1980 and 1992, represented the first time the United States had a broad-based historic preservation policy. The 1966 act required those agencies to work in conjunction with the SHPO and an independent federal agency, the Advisory Council on Historic Preservation (ACHP), to confront adverse effects of federal activities on historic preservation.

To administer the newly created National Register of Historic Places, the National Park Service of the U.S. Department of the Interior, with director George B. Hartzog Jr., established an administrative division named the Federal Office of Archaeology and Historic Preservation (OAHP). Hartzog charged OAHP with creating the National Register program mandated by the 1966 law. Ernest Connally was the Office's first director. Within OAHP new divisions were created to deal with the National Register. The division administered several existing programs, including the Historic Sites Survey and the Historic American Buildings Survey, as well as the new National Register and Historic Preservation Fund.

The first official Keeper of the Register was William J. Murtagh, an architectural historian. During the Register's earliest years in the late 1960s and early 1970s, organization was lax and SHPOs were small, understaffed and underfunded. However, funds were still being supplied for the Historic Preservation Fund to provide matching grants-in-aid to listed property owners, first for house museums and institutional buildings, but later for commercial structures as well.

In 1979, the NPS history programs affiliated with both the U.S. National Park system and the National Register were categorized formally into two "Assistant Directorates". Established were the Assistant Directorate for Archeology and Historic Preservation and the Assistant Directorate for Park Historic Preservation. From 1978 until 1981, the main agency for the National Register was the Heritage Conservation and Recreation Service (HCRS) of the United States Department of the Interior.

In February 1983, the two assistant directorates were merged to promote efficiency and recognize the interdependency of their programs. Jerry L. Rogers was selected to direct this newly merged associate directorate. He was described as a skilled administrator, who was sensitive to the need for the NPS to work with SHPOs, academia and local governments.

Although not described in detail in the 1966 act, SHPOs eventually became integral to the process of listing properties on the National Register. The 1980 amendments of the 1966 law further defined the responsibilities of SHPOs concerning the National Register. Several 1992 amendments of the NHPA added a category to the National Register, known as Traditional Cultural Properties: those properties associated with Native American or Hawaiian groups.

The National Register of Historic Places has grown considerably from its legislative origins in 1966. In 1986, citizens and groups nominated 3,623 separate properties, sites and districts for inclusion on the National Register, a total of 75,000 separate properties. Of the more than one and a half million properties on the National Register, 100,000 are listed individually. Others are listed as contributing members within historic districts.

== Nomination process ==
It is hereby declared to be the policy of the United States Government that special effort should be made to preserve the natural beauty of the countryside and public park and recreation lands, wildlife and waterfowl refuges, and historic sites.

— 49 U.S.C. § 303

Any individual can prepare a National Register nomination, although historians and historic preservation consultants often are employed for this work. The nomination consists of a standard registration form (NPS 10-900) and contains basic information about a property's physical appearance and the type of significance embodied in the building, structure, object, site, or district.

The State Historic Preservation Office (SHPO) receives National Register nominations and provides feedback to the nominating individual or group. After preliminary review, the SHPO sends each nomination to the state's historic review commission, which then recommends whether the State Historic Preservation Officer should send the nomination to the Keeper of the National Register. For any non-Federally owned property, only the State Historic Preservation Officer may officially nominate a property for inclusion in the National Register. After the nomination is recommended for listing in the National Register by the SHPO, the nomination is sent to the National Park Service, which approves or denies the nomination.

If approved, the property is entered officially by the Keeper of the National Register into the National Register of Historic Places. Property owners are notified of the nomination during the review by the SHPO and the state's historic review commission. If an owner objects to a nomination of private property, or in the case of a historic district, a majority of owners, then the property cannot be listed in the National Register of Historic Places.

=== Criteria ===
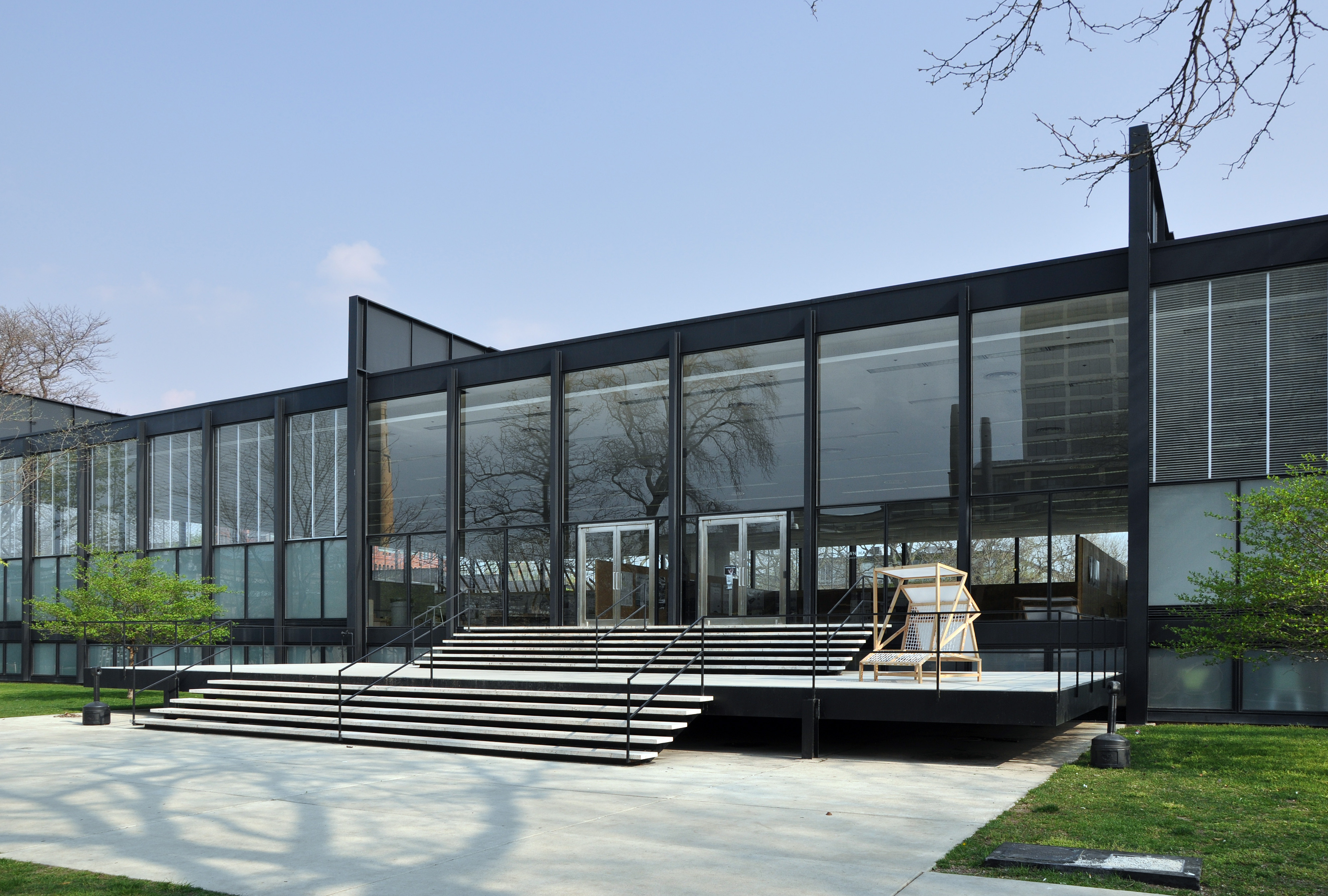
S. R. Crown Hall in Chicago, listed under criteria B and C for its association with architect Ludwig Mies van der Rohe and its modernist design

For a property to be eligible for the National Register of Historic Places, it must meet at least one of its four main criteria. Information about architectural styles, association with various aspects of social history, and commerce and ownership are all integral parts of the nomination. Each nomination contains a narrative section that provides a detailed physical description of the property and justifies why it is significant historically with regard to either local, state, or national history. The four National Register of Historic Places criteria are the following:

- Criterion A, "Event", the property must make a contribution to the major pattern of American history.
- Criterion B, "Person", is associated with significant people of the American past.
- Criterion C, "Design/Construction", concerns the distinctive characteristics of the building by its architecture and construction, including having great artistic value or being the work of a master.
- Criterion D, "Information potential", is satisfied if the property has yielded or may be likely to yield information important to prehistory or history.

The criteria are applied differently for different types of properties; for instance, maritime properties have application guidelines different from those of buildings.

=== Exclusions ===
The National Park Service names seven categories of properties that "are not usually considered for" and "ordinarily ... shall not be considered eligible for" the National Register: religious properties (e.g., churches); buildings that have been moved; birthplaces or graves of important persons; cemeteries; reconstructed properties; commemorative properties (e.g., statues); and "properties that have achieved significance within the last fifty years". However, if they meet particular "Criteria Considerations" for their category in addition to the overall criteria, they are, in fact, eligible. Hence, despite the forbidding language, these kinds of places are not actually excluded as a rule. For example, the Register lists thousands of churches.

There is a misconception that there is a strict rule that a property must be at least 50 years old to be listed in the National Register of Historic Places. In reality, there is no hard rule. John H. Sprinkle Jr., deputy director of the Federal Preservation Institute, stated:

[T]his "rule" is only an exception to the criteria that shape listings within the National Register of Historic Places. Of the eight "exceptions" [or criteria considerations], Consideration G, for properties that have achieved significance within the past fifty years, is probably the best-known, yet also misunderstood preservation principle in America.

The National Register evaluation procedures do not use the term "exclusions". The stricter National Historic Landmarks Criteria, upon which the National Register criteria are based, do specify exclusions, along with corresponding "exceptions to the exclusions", which are supposed to apply more narrowly.

=== Multiple property submission ===
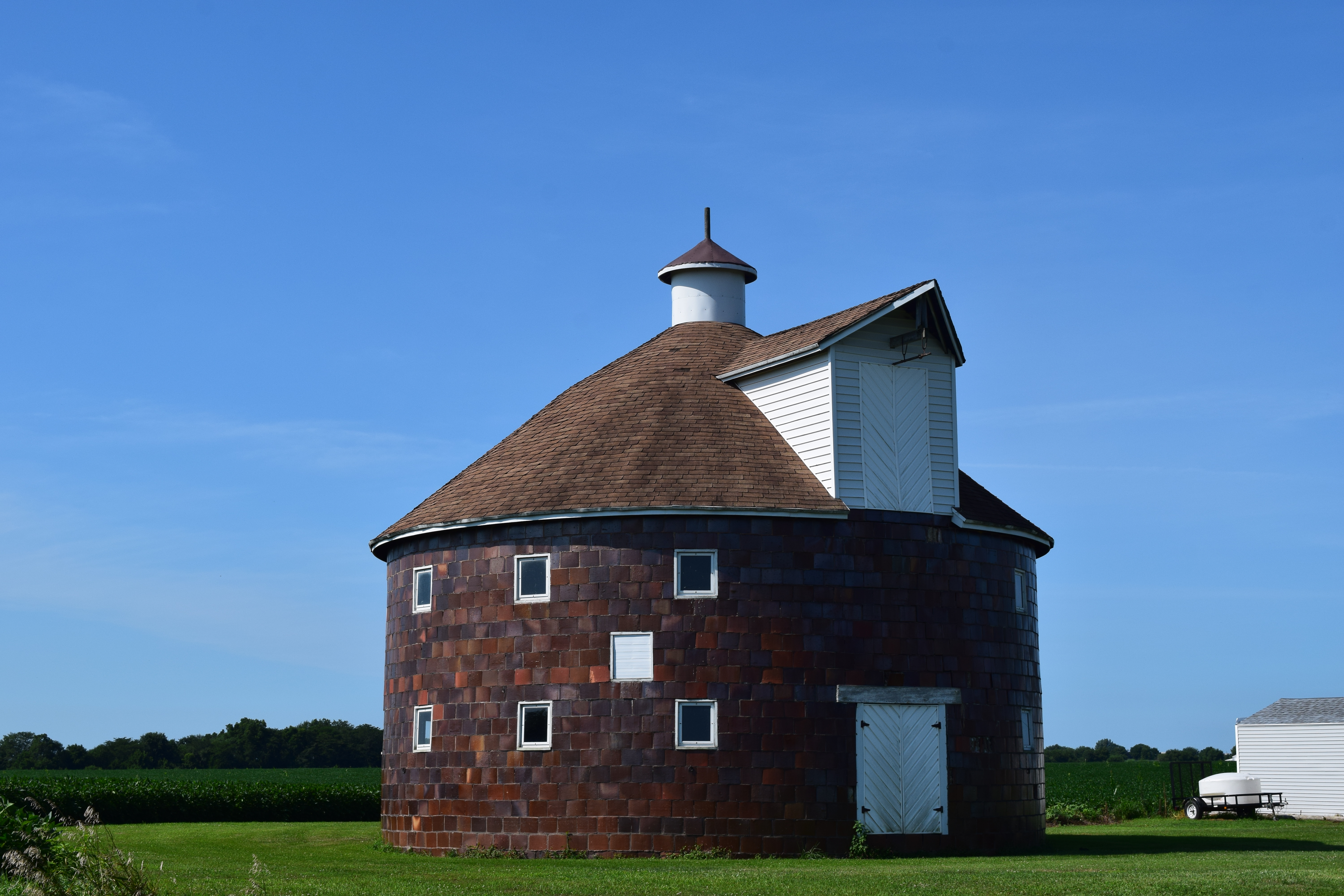
Round barns in Illinois, a multiple property submission to NRHP that includes 18 structures throughout Illinois

A multiple property submission (MPS) is a thematic group listing of the National Register of Historic Places that consists of related properties that share a common theme and can be submitted as a group. Multiple property submissions must meet specific criteria for the group of properties to be included in the National Register.

The process begins with the Multiple Property Documentation Form, which serves as a cover document rather than a nomination to the National Register of Historic Places. The purpose of the documentation form is to establish the basis of eligibility for related properties. The information from the multiple property documentation form can be used to nominate and register related historic properties simultaneously, or to establish criteria for properties that may be nominated in the future. Thus, additions to an MPS can occur over time.

The nomination of individual properties in an MPS is accomplished in the same manner as other nominations. The name of the "thematic group" denotes the historical theme of the properties. It is considered the "multiple property listing". Once an individual property or a group of properties is nominated and listed in the National Register, the multiple property documentation form, combined with the individual National Register of Historic Places nomination forms, constitutes a multiple property submission.

Examples of MPS include the Lee County Multiple Property Submission, the Warehouses in Omaha, the Boundary Markers of the Original District of Columbia and the Illinois Carnegie Libraries. Before the term "Multiple Property Submission" was introduced in 1984, such listings were known as "Thematic Resources", such as the Operating Passenger Railroad Stations Thematic Resource, or "Multiple Resource Areas".

== Properties listed ==
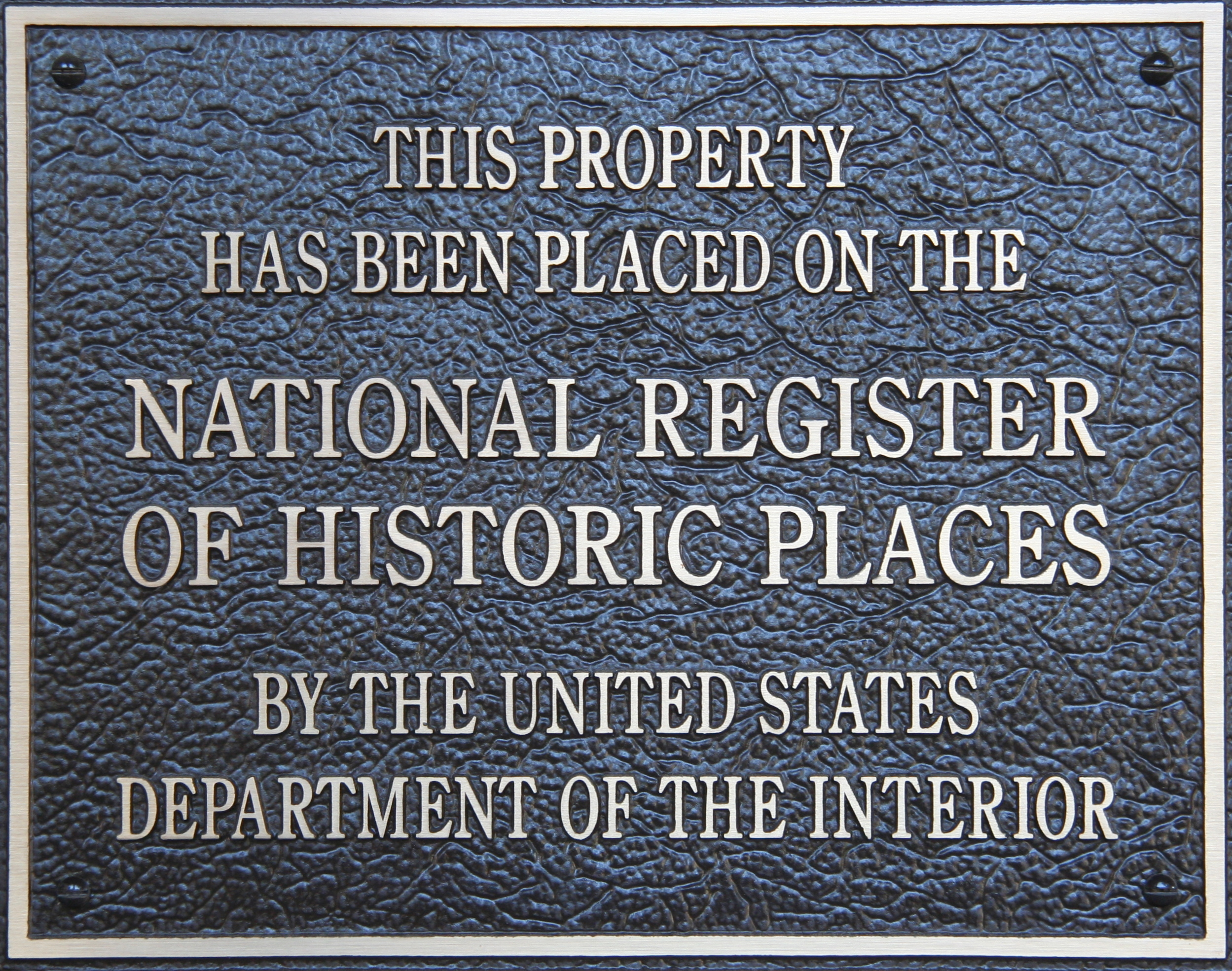
A typical black-and-bronze plaque found on properties listed in the NRHP, reading "This Property Has Been Placed on the National Register of Historic Places by the United States Department of the Interior".

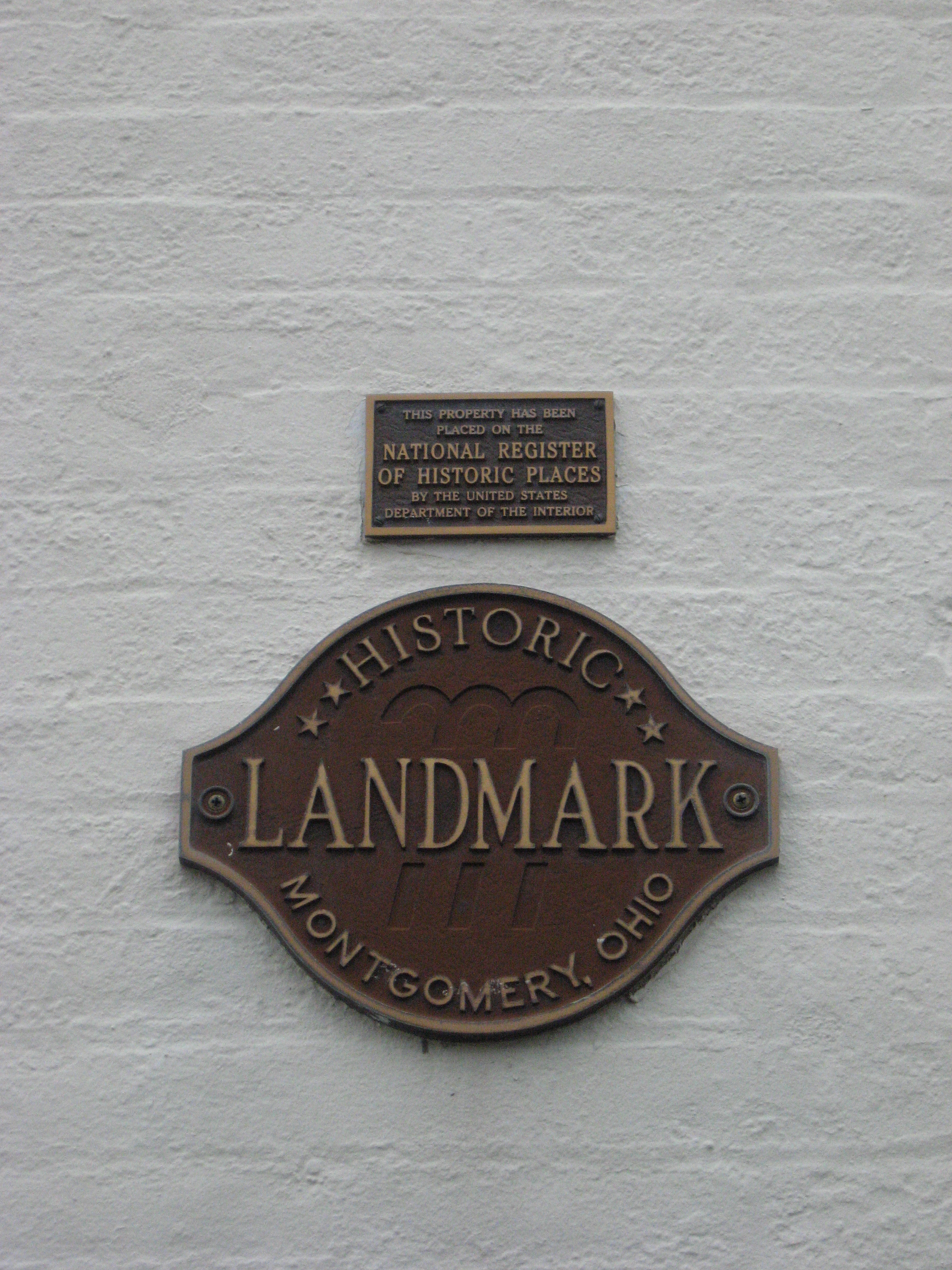
An alternate series of plaques. Buildings on the National Register are also often listed in local historic societies.

A listing on the National Register of Historic Places is a governmental acknowledgment of a historic district, site, building, or property. However, the Register is mostly "an honorary status with some federal financial incentives". The National Register of Historic Places automatically includes all National Historic Landmarks as well as all historic areas administered by the National Park Service, including National Historic Sites (NHS), National Historical Parks, National Military Parks/Battlefields, National Memorials and some National Monuments.

There are also 35 listed sites in the three island countries with a Compact of Free Association with the United States, as well as one site in Morocco, the American Legation in Tangier.

Listing in the National Register does not restrict private property owners from the use of their property.

Some states and municipalities, however, may have laws that become effective when a property is listed in the National Register. If federal money or a federal permitting process is involved, Section 106 of the National Historic Preservation Act of 1966 is invoked. Section 106 requires the federal agency involved to assess the effect of its actions on historic resources. A salient example of a successful 106 Review was the early 1970s review of the Department of Transportation's proposal to tunnel under Baltimore's historic Federal Hill neighborhood with a 14-lane highway, the 106 Review, and the highway's ultimate rerouting and reduction in size -- as well as provision of a buffer park, what became Baltimore's Robert Baker Park.

Statutorily, the Advisory Council on Historic Preservation (ACHP) has the most significant role by Section 106 of the National Historic Preservation Act. The section requires that the director of any federal agency with direct or indirect jurisdiction of a project that may affect a property listed or determined eligible for listing in the National Register of Historic Places must first report to the Advisory Council. The director of said agency is required to "take into account the effect of the undertaking" on the National Register property, as well as to afford the ACHP a reasonable opportunity to comment.

While Section 106 does not mandate explicitly that any federal agency director accept the advice of the ACHP, their advice has a practical influence, especially given the statutory obligations of the NHPA that require federal agencies to "take into account the effect of the undertaking".

In cases where the ACHP determines federal action will have an "adverse effect" on historic properties, mitigation is sought. Typically, a Memorandum of Agreement (MOA) is created by which the involved parties agree to a particular plan. Many states have laws similar to Section 106. In contrast to conditions relating to a federally designated historic district, municipal ordinances governing local historic districts often restrict certain kinds of changes to properties. Thus, they may protect the property more than a National Register listing does.

The Department of Transportation Act, passed on October 15, 1966, the same day as the National Historic Preservation Act, included provisions that addressed historic preservation. The DOT Act is much more general than Section 106 NHPA in that it refers to properties other than those listed in the Register.

The more general language has allowed more properties and parklands to enjoy status as protected areas by this legislation, a policy developed early in its history. The United States Supreme Court ruled in the 1971 case Citizens to Preserve Overton Park v. Volpe that parklands could have the same protected status as "historic sites".

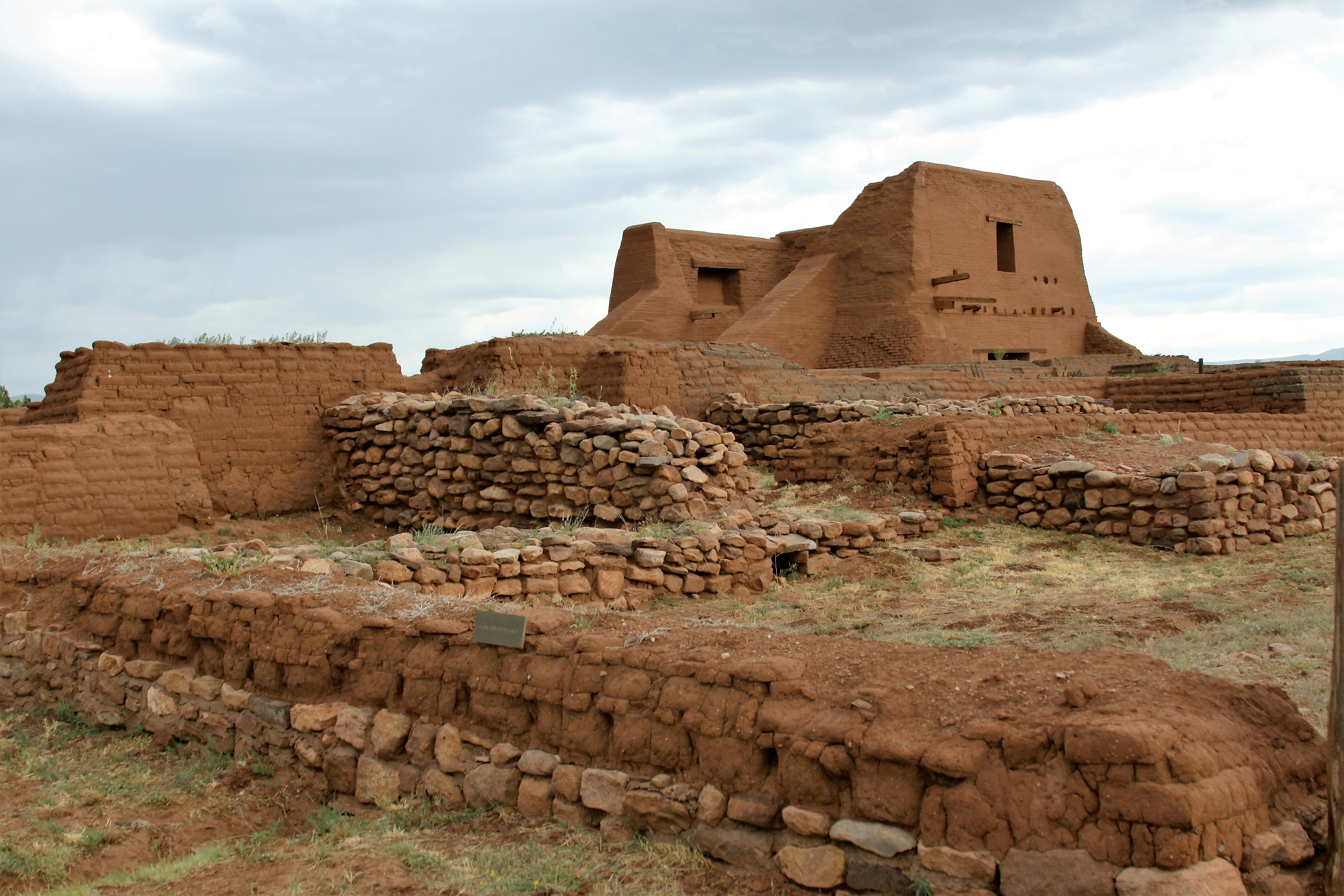
Pecos Pueblo in Pecos, New Mexico, one of a number of NRHP sites administered by the National Park Service

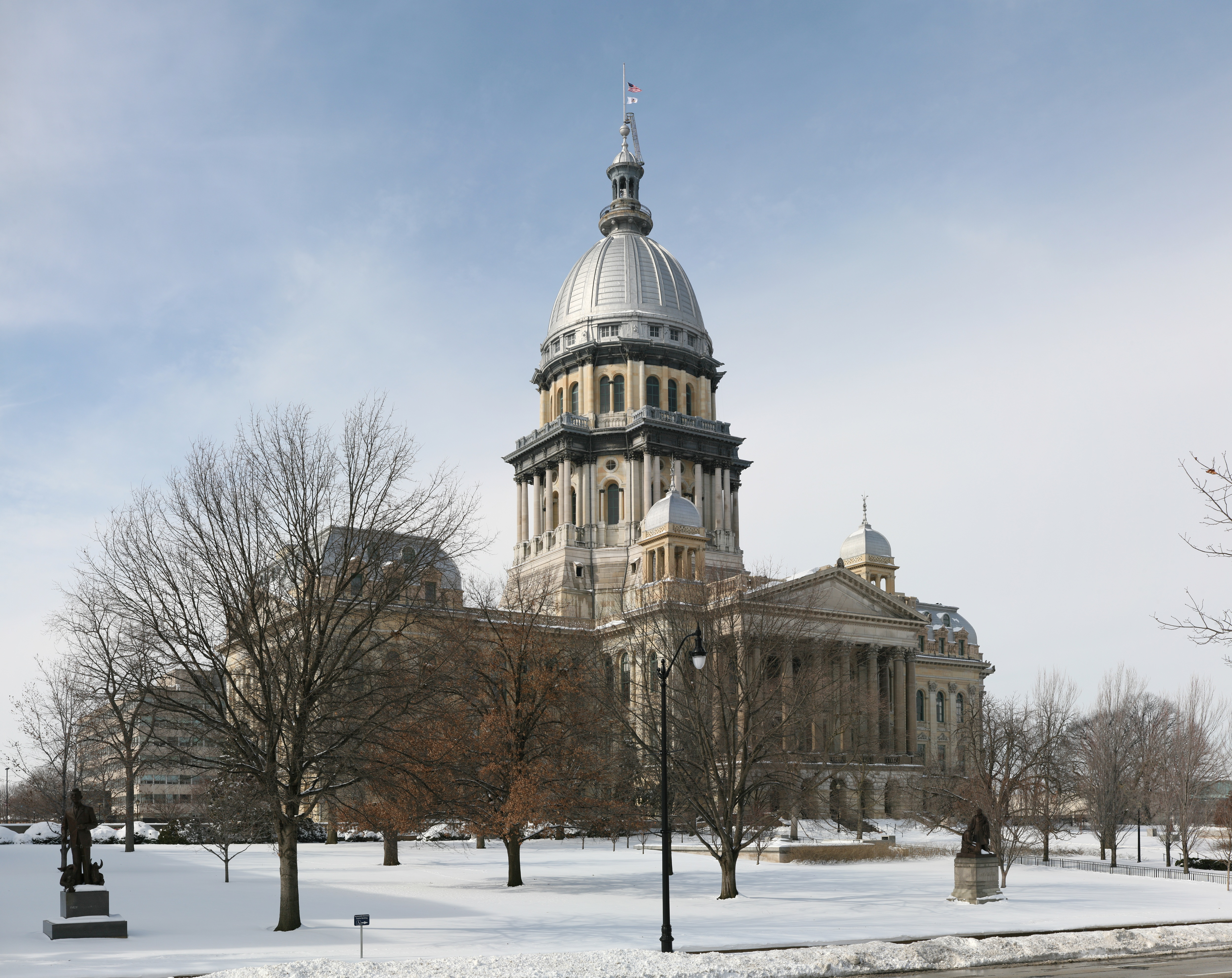
The Illinois State Capitol in Springfield, Illinois, one of 44 U.S. state capitols listed on the NRHP

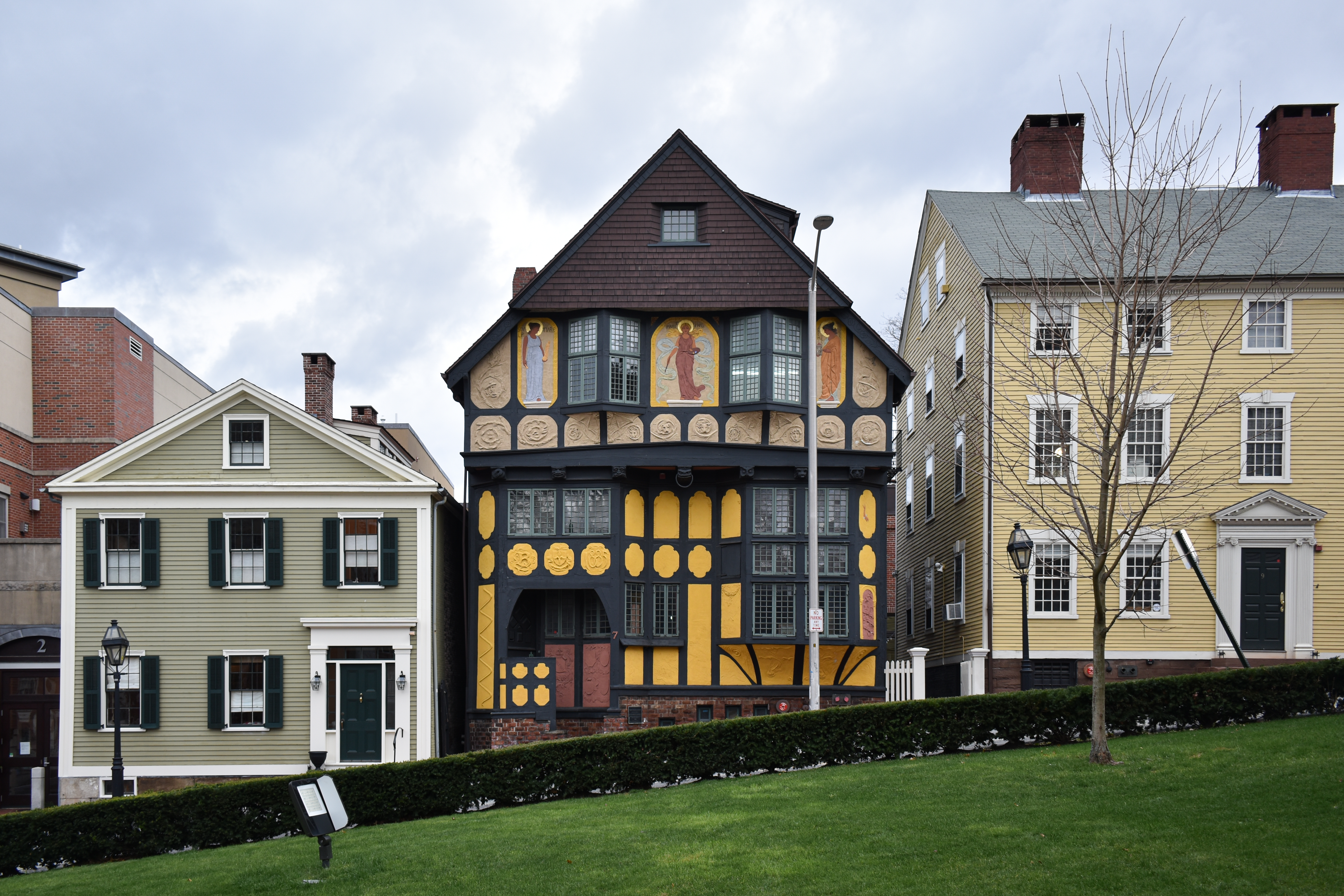
College Hill Historic District in Providence, Rhode Island, an example of a National Historic Landmark District

Robert C. Weaver Federal Building in Washington, D.C., an example of a modern building listed on the NRHP

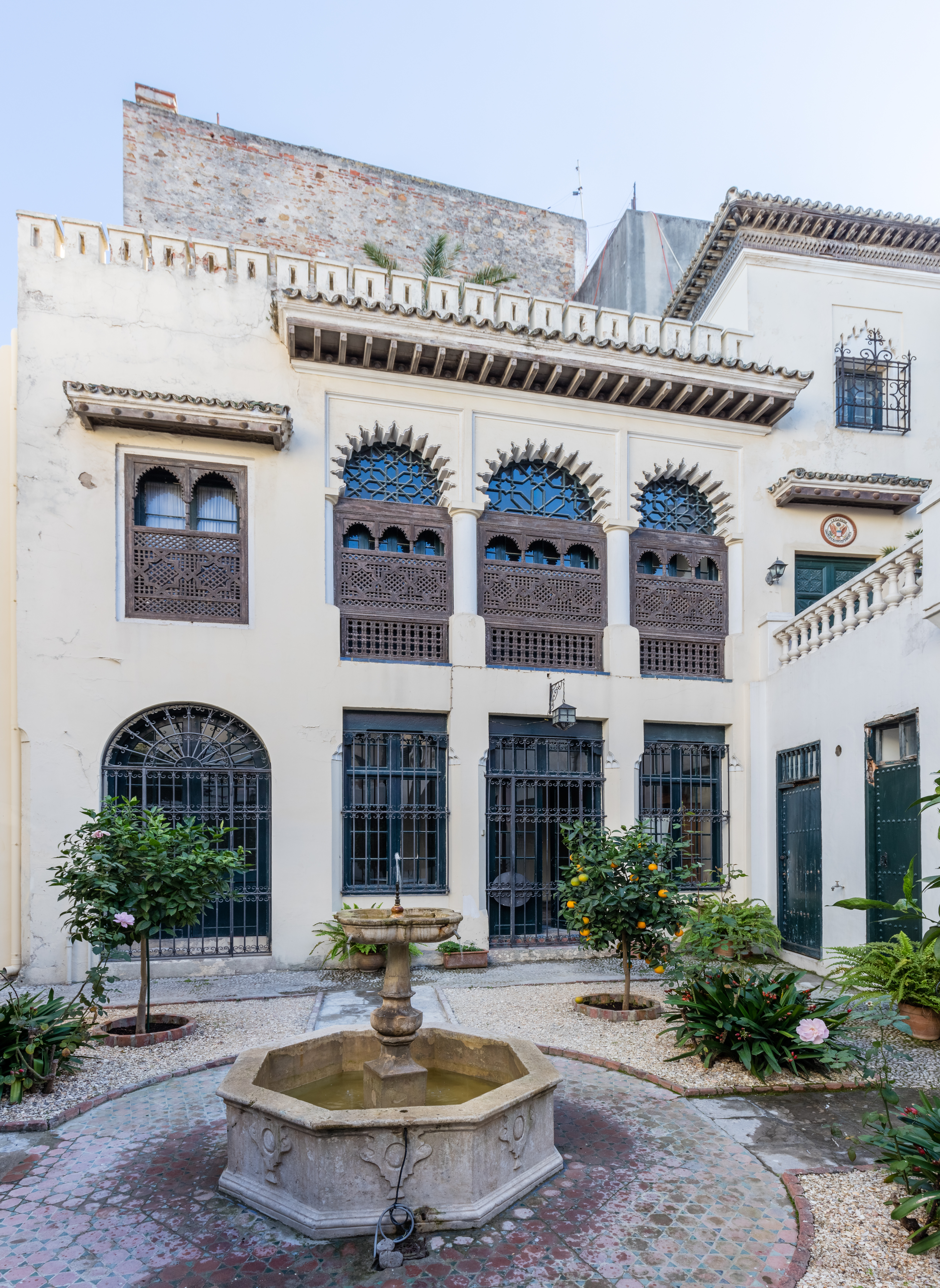
American Legation in Tangier, Morocco, the only site on the NRHP in a foreign nation other than the Compact of Free Association states

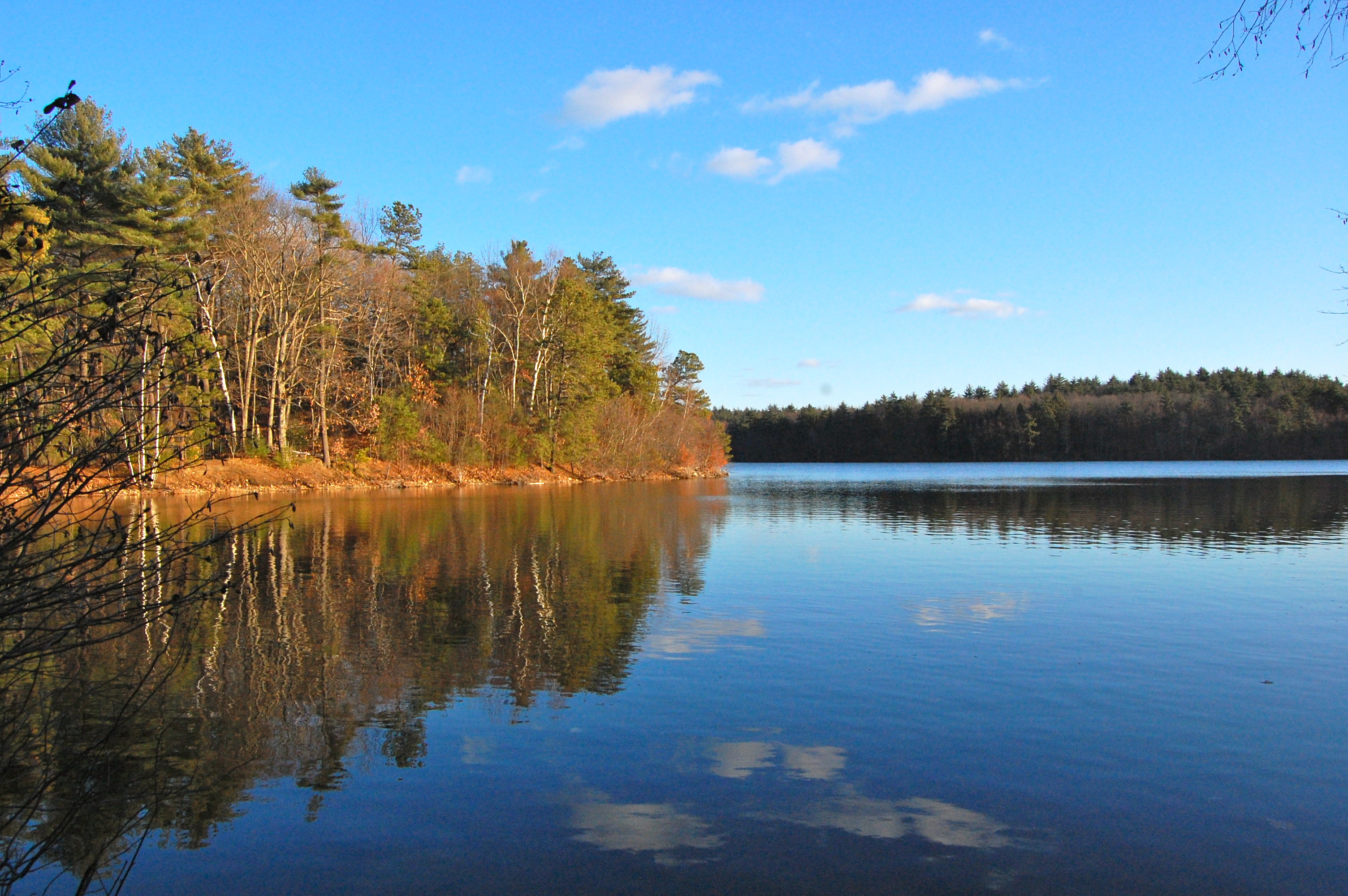
Walden Pond in Concord, Massachusetts, an example of a natural site listed on the NRHP

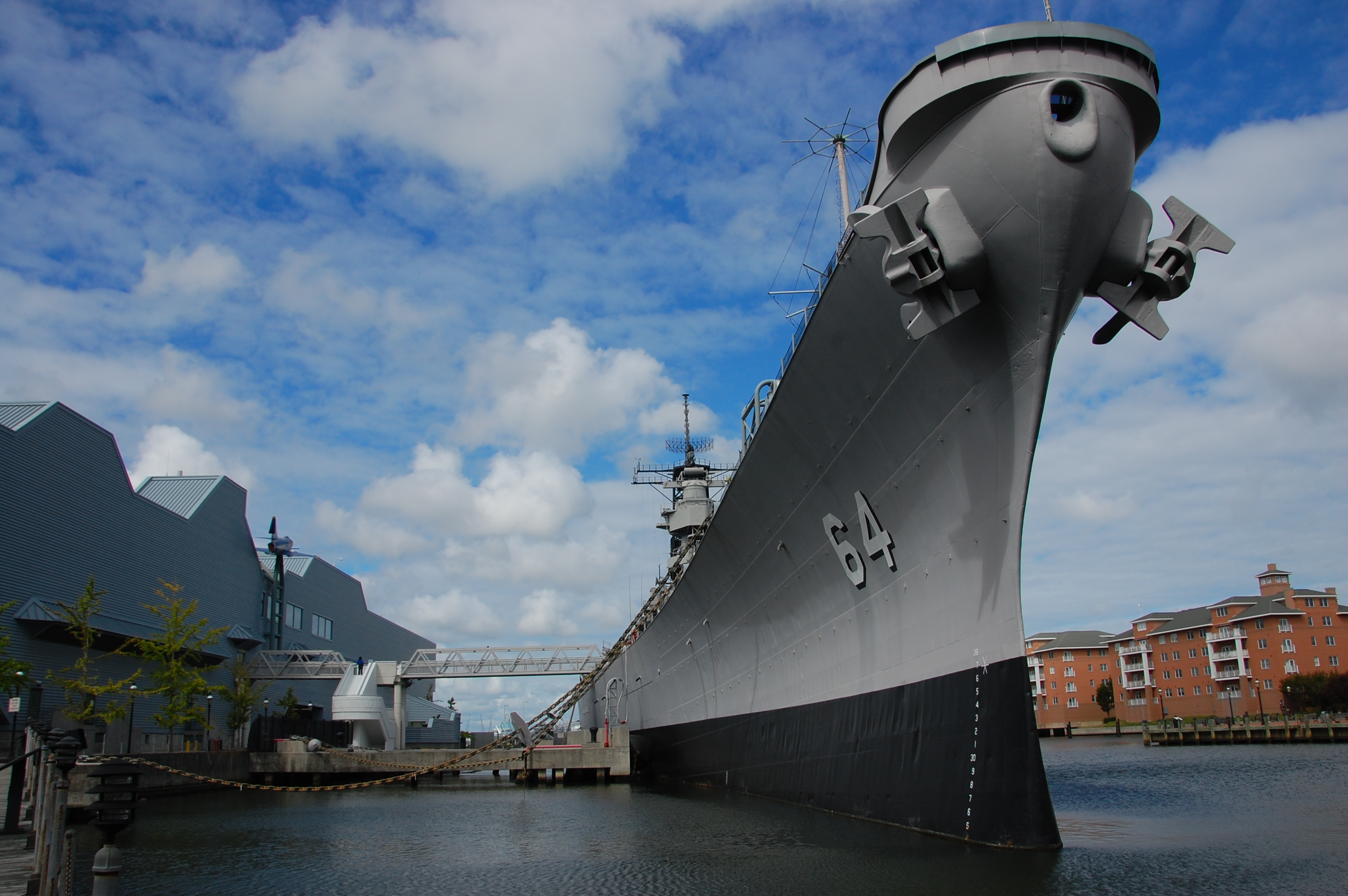
The USS Wisconsin (BB-64), docked in Norfolk, Virginia, one of a number of ships listed on the NRHP

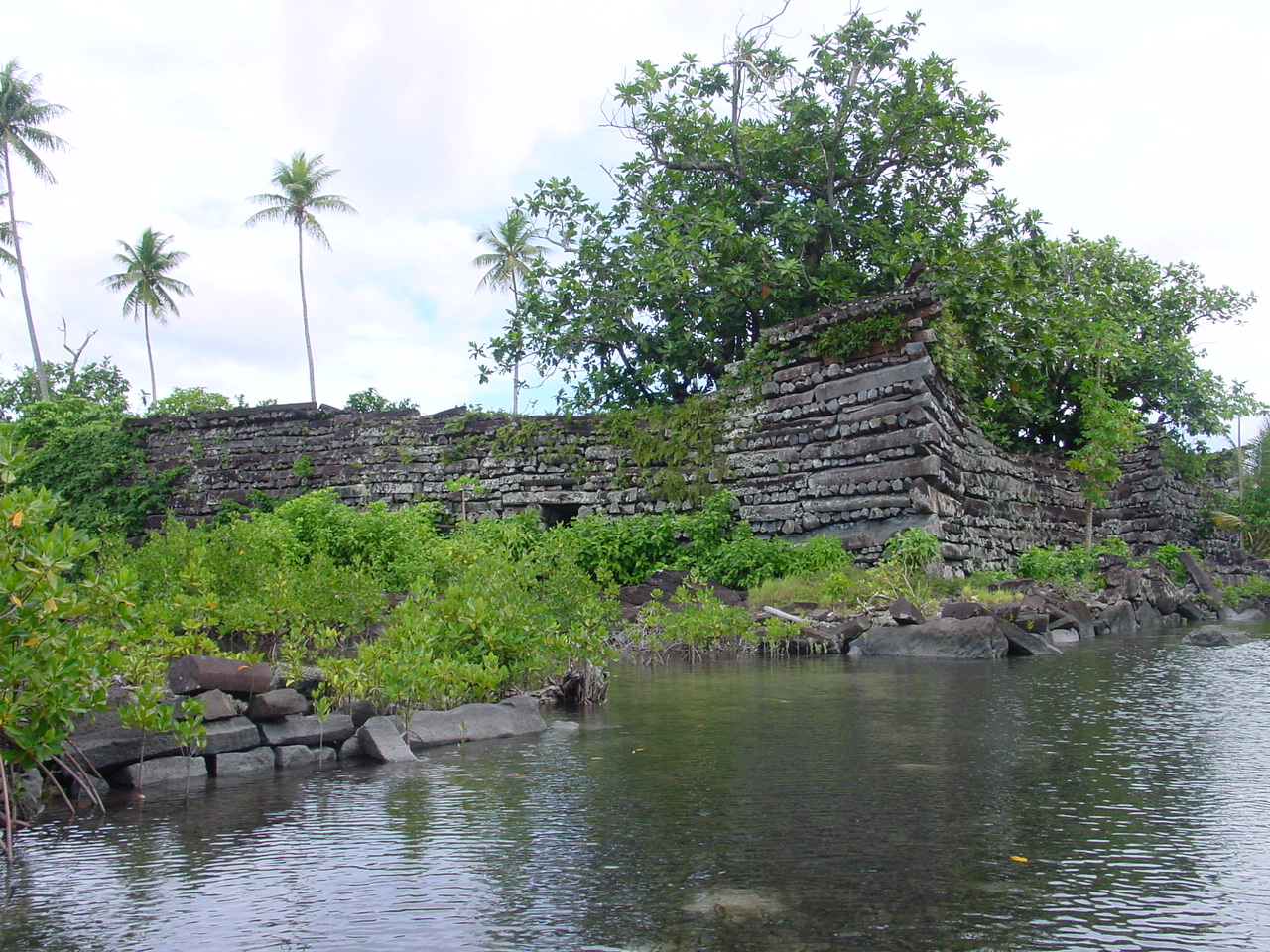
Nan Madol, the ruined ancient city of Pohnpei in the Federated States of Micronesia, named to the NRHP in 1974

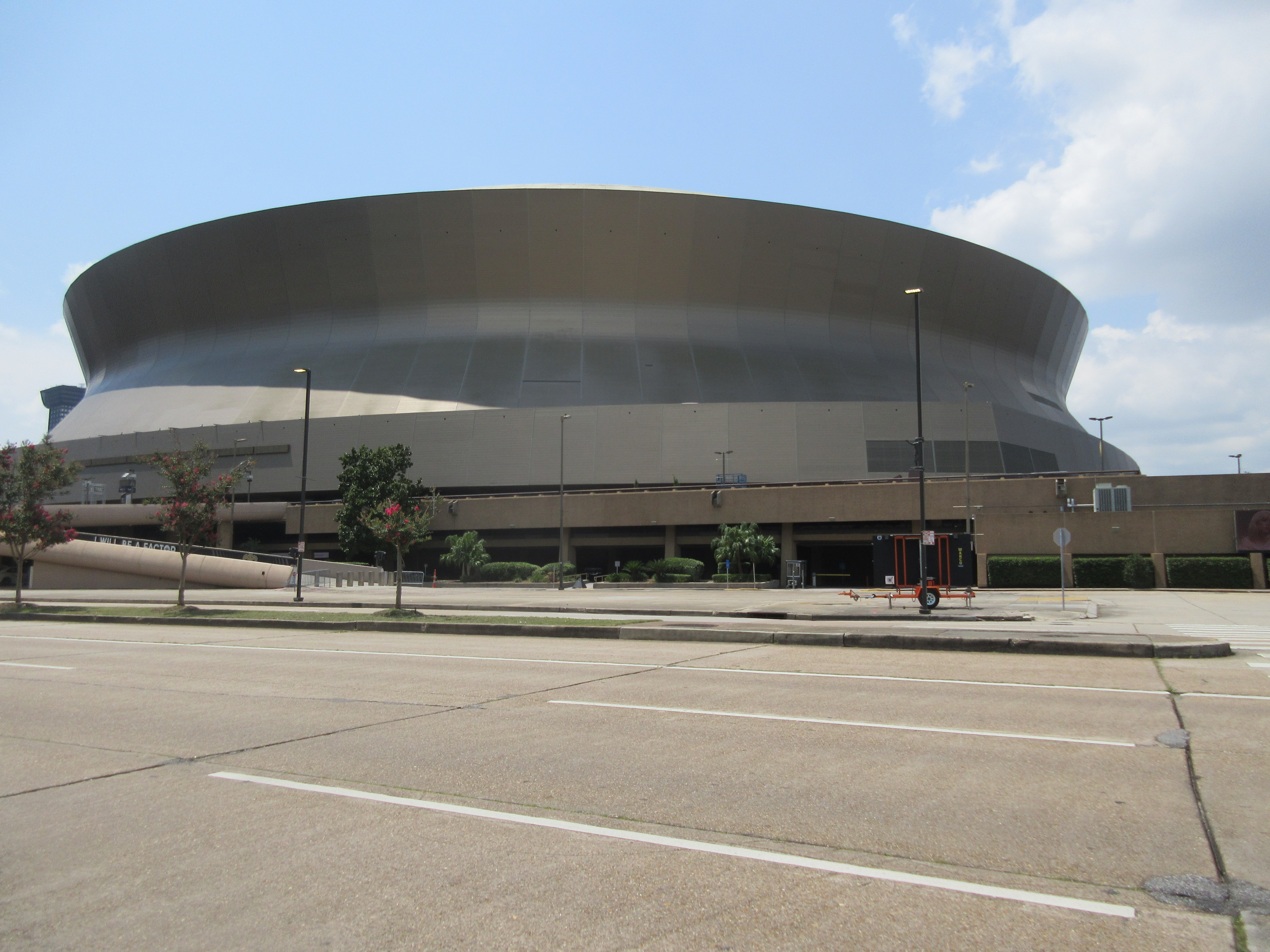
Louisiana Superdome, now Caesars Superdome, known for its timeless exterior design since first opening in 1975

=== Types of properties ===
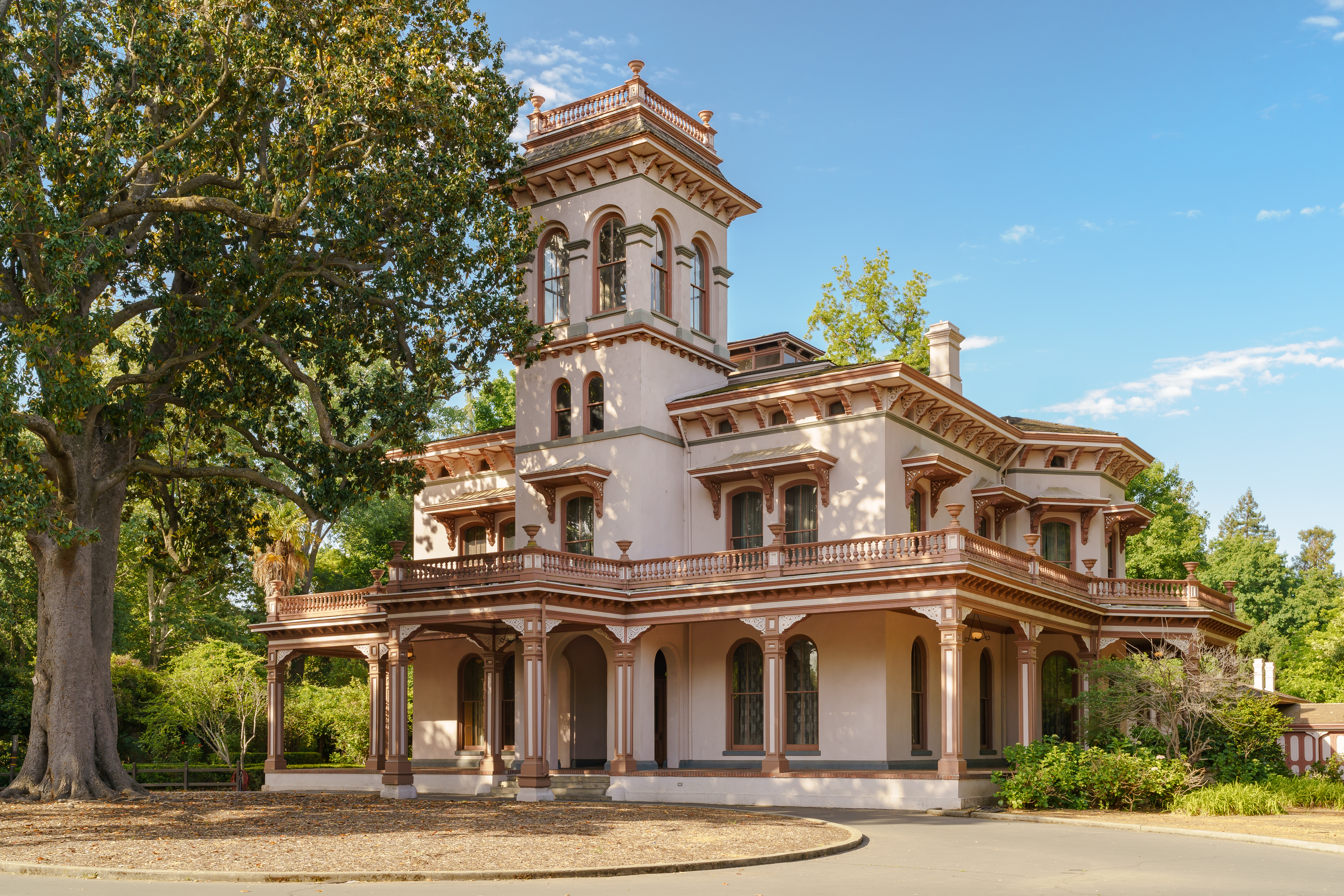
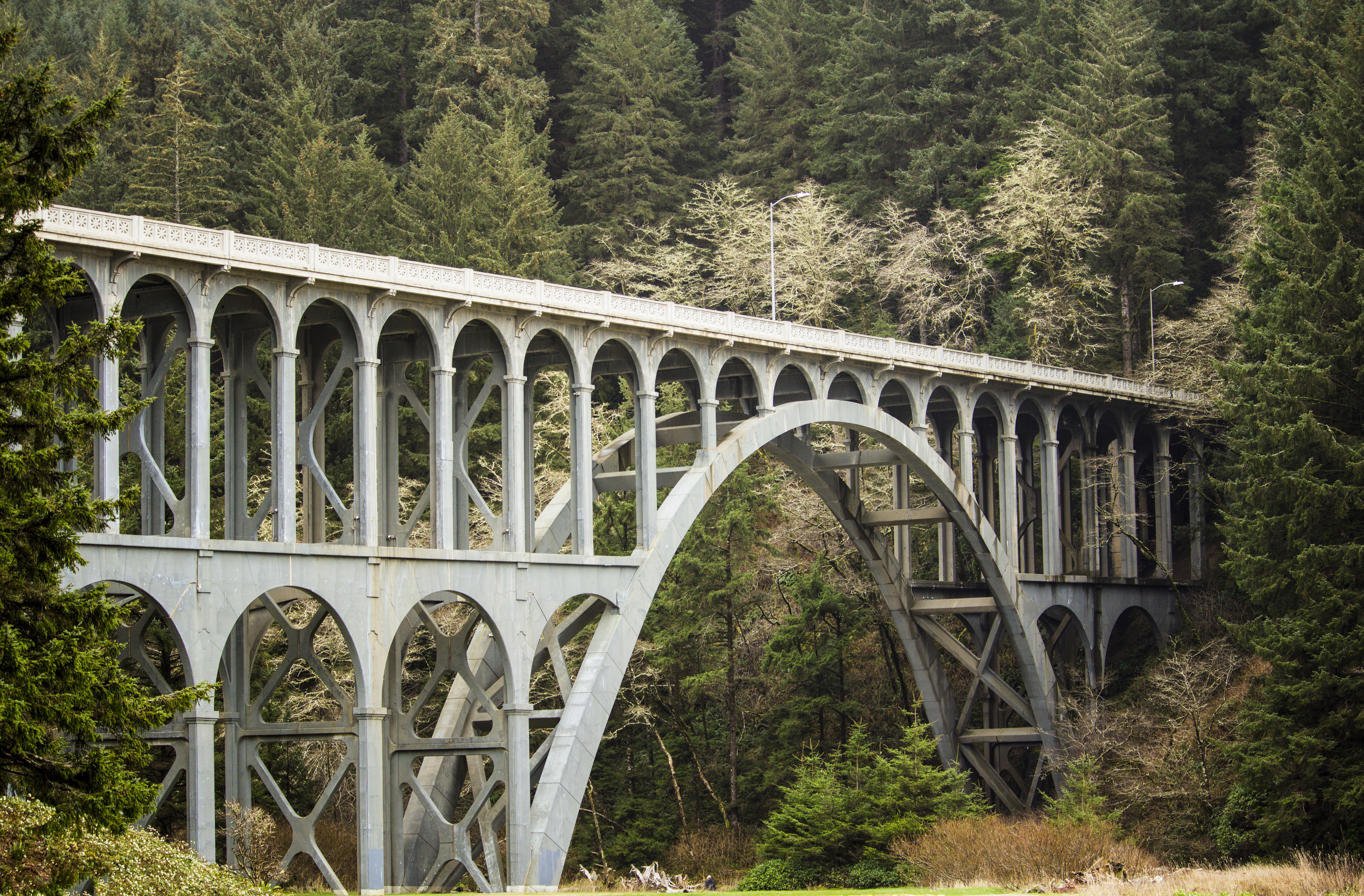
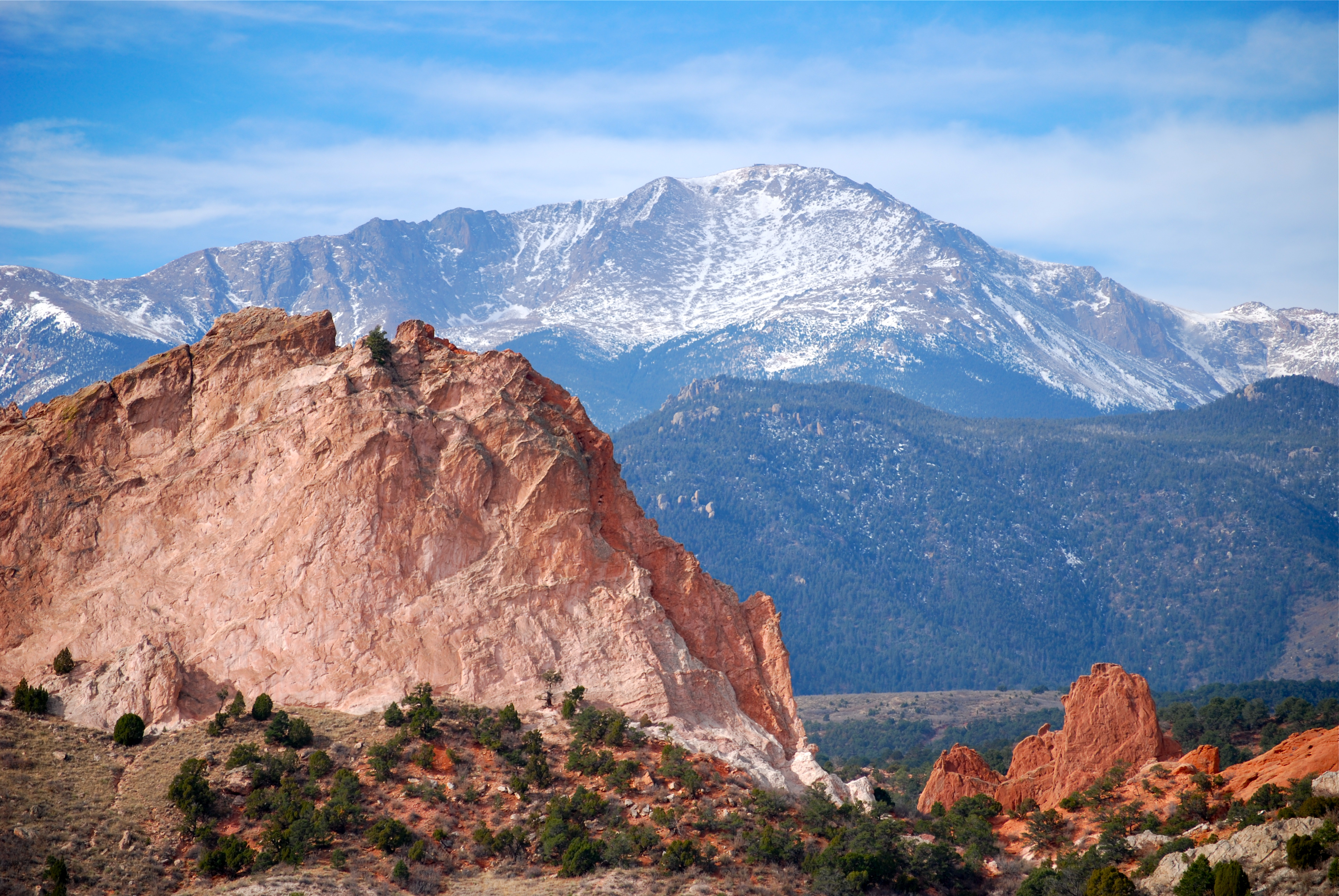
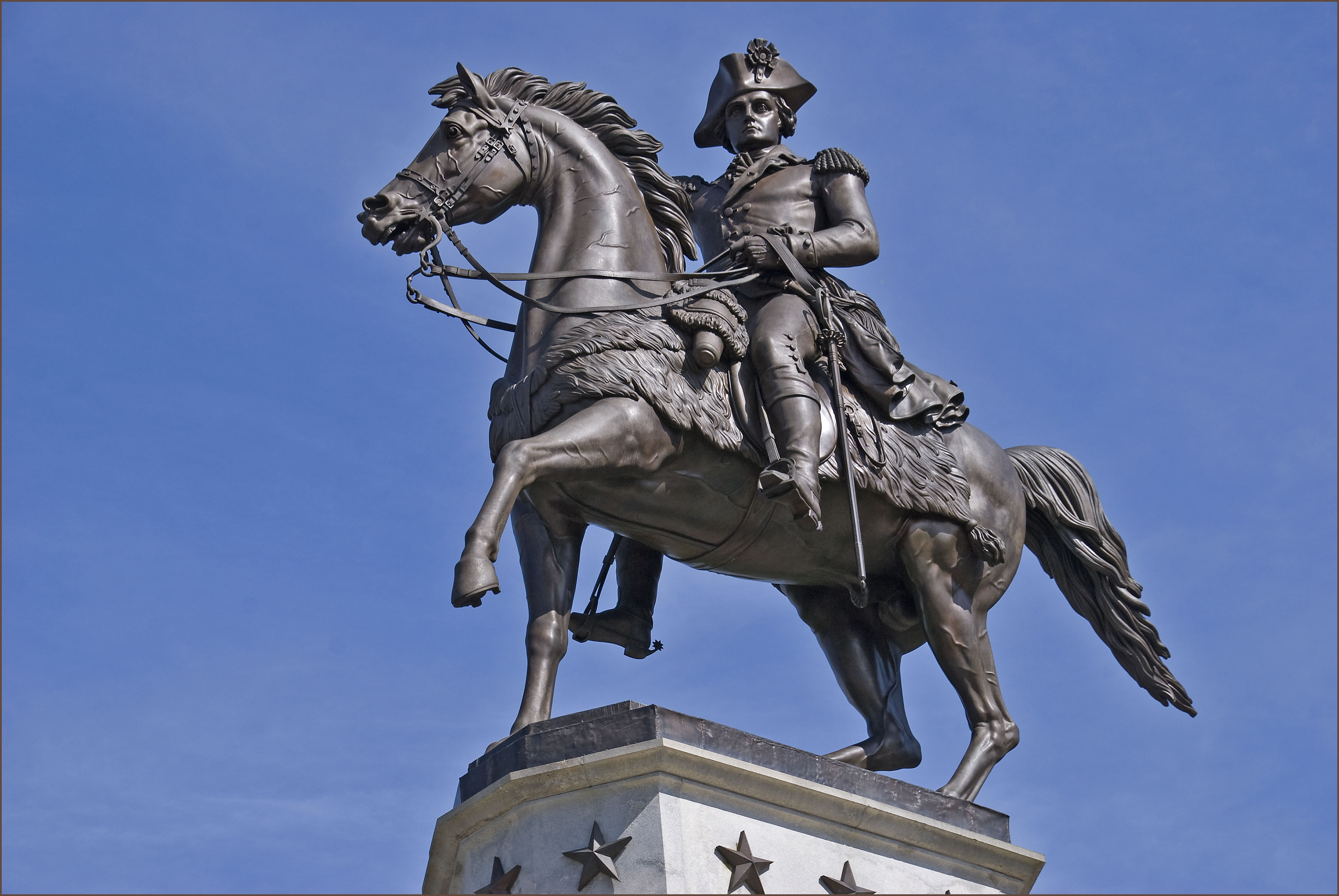
Clockwise from top: a building, a structure, an object and a site – all are examples of NRHP property types.

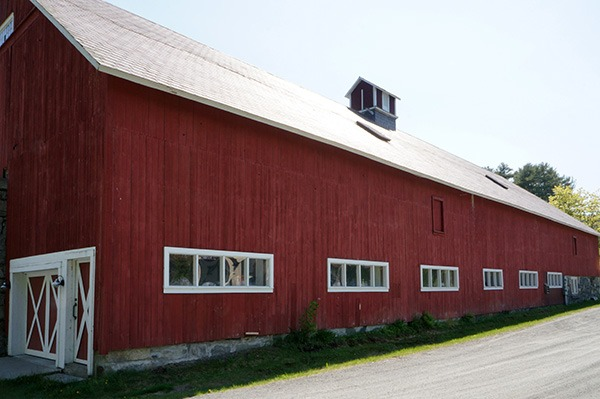
A cow barn in Enfield Shaker Village in Enfield, New Hampshire, built 1854, listed with NRHP

Listed properties are generally in one of five broad categories, although there are special considerations for other types of properties that in anyone, or into more specialized subcategories. The five general categories for National Register properties are: building, structure, site, district and object. In addition, historic districts consist of contributing and non-contributing properties.

Buildings, as defined by the National Register, are distinguished in the traditional sense. Examples include a house, barn, hotel, church, or similar construction. They are created primarily to shelter human activity. The term building, as in outbuilding, can be used to refer to historically and functionally related units, such as a courthouse and a jail or a barn and a house.

Structures differ from buildings in that they are functional constructions meant to be used for purposes other than sheltering human activity. Examples include an aircraft, a grain elevator, a gazebo and a bridge.

Objects are usually artistic in nature, or small in scale compared to structures and buildings. Although objects may be movable, they are generally associated with a specific setting or environment. Examples of objects include monuments, sculptures and fountains.

Sites are the locations of significant events, which can be prehistoric or historic in nature and represent activities or buildings (standing, ruined, or vanished). When sites are listed, it is the locations themselves that are of historical interest. They possess cultural or archaeological value regardless of the value of any structures that currently exist at the locations. Examples of types of sites include shipwrecks, battlefields, campsites, natural features and rock shelters.

Historic districts possess a concentration, association, or continuity of the other four types of properties. Objects, structures, buildings and sites in a historic district are united historically or aesthetically, either by choice or by the nature of their development.

There are several other different types of historic preservation associated with the properties of the National Register of Historic Places that cannot be classified as either simple buildings or historic districts. Through the National Park Service, the National Register of Historic Places publishes a series of bulletins designed to aid in evaluating and applying the criteria for evaluation of different types of properties. Although the criteria are always the same, the manner in which they are applied may differ slightly, depending upon the type of property involved. The National Register bulletins describe the application of the criteria for aids to navigation, historic battlefields, archaeological sites, aviation properties, cemeteries and burial places, historic designed landscapes, mining sites, post offices, properties associated with significant persons, properties achieving significance within the last fifty years, rural historic landscapes, traditional cultural properties and vessels and shipwrecks.

== Property owner incentives ==
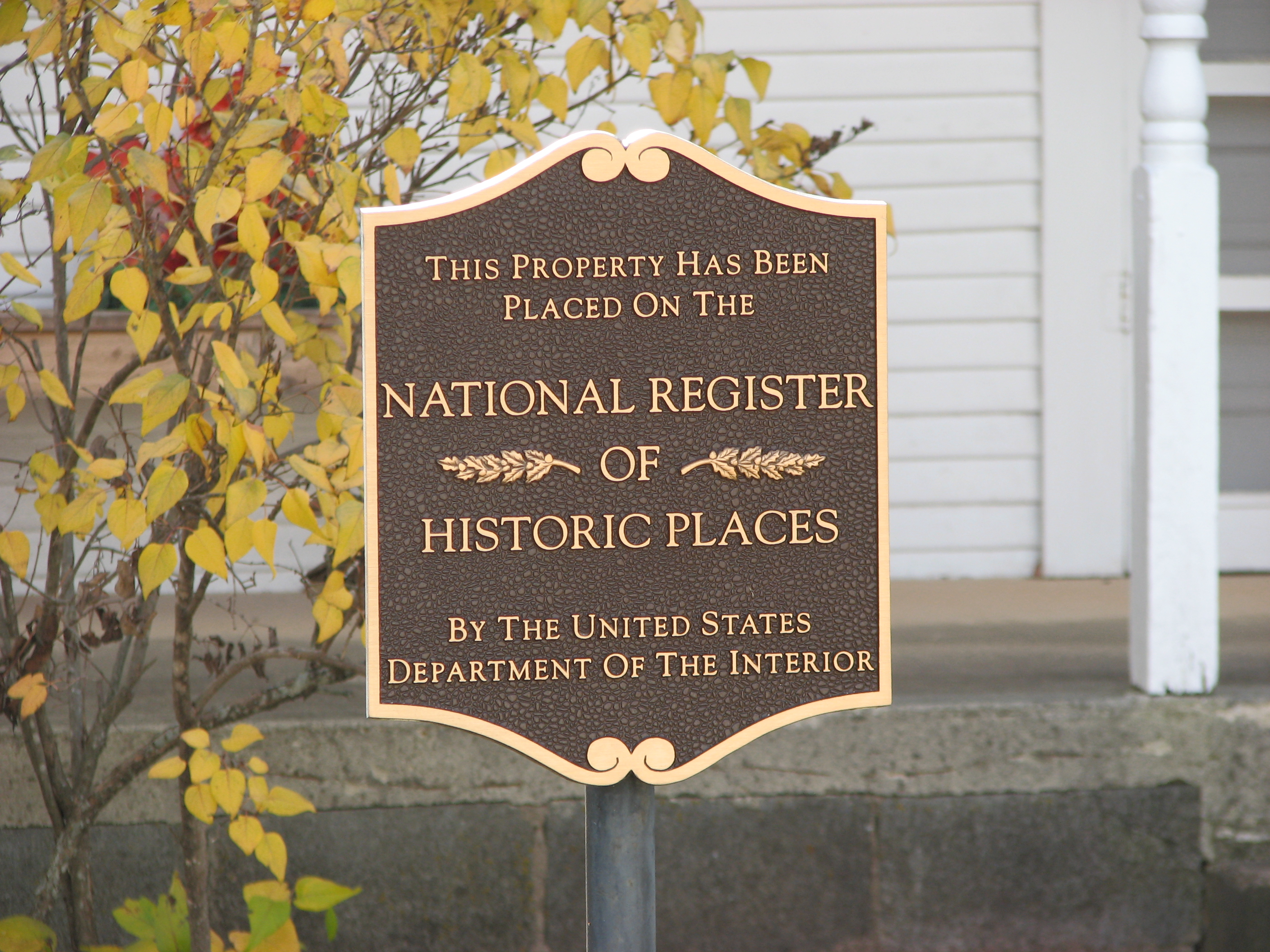
A National Register of Historic Places plaque at the Robert E. Howard Museum in Cross Plains, Texas

Properties are not protected in any strict sense by the Federal listing. States and local zoning bodies may or may not choose to protect listed historic places. Indirect protection is possible, by state and local regulations on the development of National Register properties and by tax incentives. By contrast, the state of Colorado, for example, does not set any limits on owners of National Register properties.

Until 1976, federal tax incentives were virtually non-existent for buildings on the National Register. Before 1976 the federal tax code favored new construction rather than the reuse of existing, sometimes historical, structures. In 1976, the tax code was altered to provide tax incentives that promote the preservation of income-producing historic properties. The National Park Service was given the responsibility to ensure that only rehabilitations that preserved the historic character of a building would qualify for federal tax incentives. A qualifying rehabilitation is one that the NPS deems consistent with the Secretary of the Interior's Standards for Rehabilitation. Properties and sites listed in the Register, as well as those located in and contributing to the period of significance of National Register Historic Districts, became eligible for the federal tax benefits.

Owners of income-producing properties listed individually in the National Register of Historic Places or of properties that are contributing resources within a National Register Historic District may be eligible for a 20% investment tax credit for the rehabilitation of the historic structure. The rehabilitation may be of a commercial, industrial, or residential property, for rentals. The tax incentives program is operated by the Federal Historic Preservation Tax Incentives program, which is managed jointly by the National Park Service, individual State Historic Preservation Offices and the Internal Revenue Service.

Some property owners may also qualify for grants, like the now-defunct Save America's Treasures grants, which apply specifically to properties entered in the Register with national significance or designated as National Historic Landmarks.

The NHPA did not distinguish between properties listed in the National Register of Historic Places and those designated as National Historic Landmarks concerning qualification for tax incentives or grants. This was deliberate, as the authors of the act had learned from experience that distinguishing between categories of significance for such incentives caused the lowest category to become expendable. Essentially, this made the Landmarks a kind of "honor roll" of the most significant properties of the National Register of Historic Places.

== Limitations ==
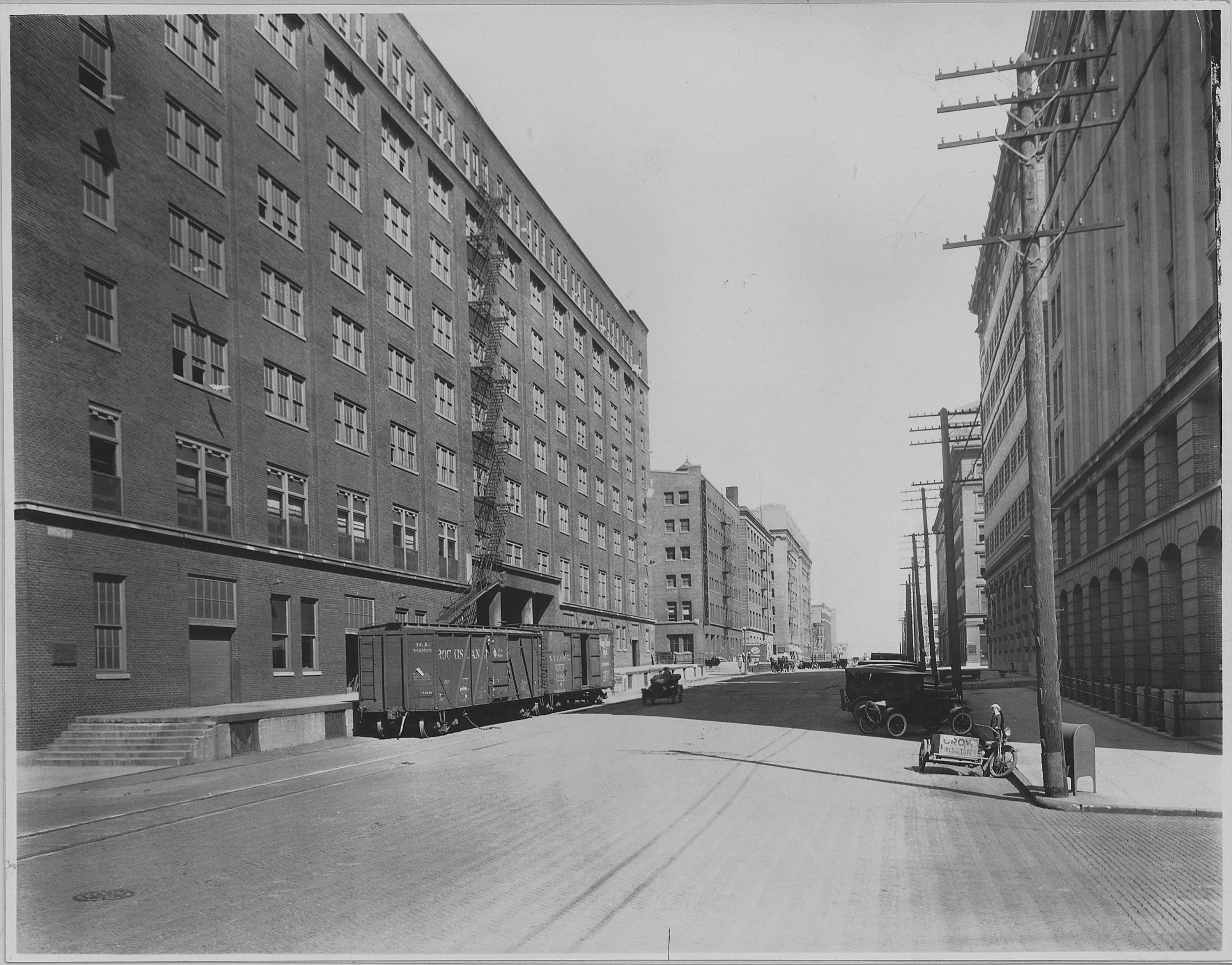
The demolition of the Jobbers Canyon Historic District in Downtown Omaha, the largest National Register historic district lost to date

As of 1999, 982 properties had been removed from the Register, most often due to being destroyed. Among the properties that were demolished or otherwise destroyed after their listing are the Jobbers Canyon Historic District in Omaha, Nebraska (listed in 1986, demolished in 1989), Pan-Pacific Auditorium in Los Angeles, California (listed in 1978, destroyed in a fire in 1989), Palace Amusements in Asbury Park, New Jersey (listed in 2000, demolished in 2004), The Balinese Room in Galveston, Texas (listed in 1997, destroyed by Hurricane Ike in 2008), seven of the nine buildings included in the University of Connecticut Historic District in Storrs, Connecticut (listed in 1989, demolished in 2017),, the radio telescope at the Arecibo Observatory in Arecibo, Puerto Rico (listed in 2008, collapsed prior to demolition following a previous collapse in 2020), the Terrell Jacobs Circus Winter Quarters in Peru, Indiana (listed in 2012, demolished in 2021), and the SS United States (listed in 1999, sunk as an artificial reef in 2026).

== Comparisons to historic registers of other nations ==
In France, designation of monument historique is similar to NRHP listing. In the French program, however, permanent restrictions are imposed upon designated monuments, for example requiring advance approval for any renovation of a designated building. France had about 43,600 monuments in 2015.

Listed buildings of the United Kingdom may not be demolished, extended, or altered without special permission; the program covers about 374,000 listings in 2010, involving more than 500,000 buildings.

NRHP listing, in contrast, imposes no such restrictions, but rather is "primarily an honor", although tax subsidies may be available for renovations.

In 2026, the U.S. has about 100,000 NRHP-listed properties, including historic districts; the total number of buildings covered is much larger.

== See also ==
- Amusement rides on the National Register of Historic Places
- List of African-American historic places
- List of heritage registers
- List of jails and prisons on the National Register of Historic Places
- List of National Historic Landmarks by state
- List of national memorials of the United States
- List of university and college buildings on the National Register of Historic Places
- Listed building – the UK equivalent
- National Heritage Area – Land designation by the U.S. government to encourage preservation
- Register of Culturally Significant Property
- United States National Register of Historic Places listings
