= Gary Everhardt =

Director of the United States National Park Service (1934–2020)

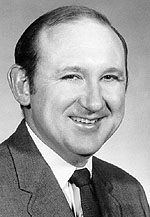

9th Director of the National Park Service
- In office January 13, 1975 – May 27, 1977
- President: Richard Nixon; Gerald Ford; Jimmy Carter
- Preceded by: Ronald H. Walker
- Succeeded by: William J. Whalen III

Personal details
- Born: July 8, 1934; Lenoir, North Carolina, U.S.
- Died: December 27, 2020 (aged 86); Charlotte, North Carolina, U.S.
- Spouse: Nancy Everhardt
- Children: Karen Everhardt; Phil Everhardt
- Occupation: Naturalist, Director of the National Park Service

Gary E. Everhardt (July 8, 1934 – December 27, 2020), was the ninth Director of the US National Park Service (NPS). He began his NPS career as an engineer in 1957 and rose to the superintendency of Grand Teton National Park in 1972. Favorable notice there propelled him to the directorship in January 1975. As director he oversaw a great increase in park development and interpretive programming for the Bicentennial of the American Revolution. The return of an NPS careerist to the job was much applauded by park employees and supporters, but Everhardt's leadership fell short of expectations, and the new Carter administration returned him to the field as Blue Ridge Parkway's superintendent in May 1977.

== Biography ==
Everhardt took a civil engineering degree at North Carolina State University, served as an Army officer, and became a NPS engineer. As Director (1975–77), he led the NPS through the implementation of the United States Bicentennial observance. The NPS conducted activities at 250 sites coast-to-coast. Everhardt pushed wilderness designation and hailed a Presidential proposal for a $1.5 billion Bicentennial Land Heritage Program.

During his Directorship, a policy council was created, which produced management objectives for the Service. Other firsts were the first national symposium on urban recreation; the first national conference on scientific research; the first Native crafts sales program in parks and the first international park publication, PARKS.

The Everhardt years were short, and consumed by the Bicentennial of the United States. During these years, the service was expanding its workforce. The number of individuals interested in positions far exceeded the jobs available. Professional skills were becoming more extensive and the need for specialists was evident. In his book, The National Park Service, William Everhardt (no relation) laid out the variety of skills needed to successfully operate a national park. No longer was the Park Ranger to be a multi-talented individual. New positions were being defined covering many of the jobs previously done by the park ranger. The new service would include; fire technicians, search and rescue specialists, law enforcement specialists, museum technicians, exhibit designers, film production people and many other skills once done by the park ranger.

== See also ==
- National Park Service

Government offices
Preceded by Ronald H. Walker	Director of the National Park Service; 1975–1977	Succeeded by William J. Whalen III
