= Director of the National Park Service =

American government official

The director of the National Park Service of the United States is nominated by the president and requires a Senate confirmation.

== List of directors of the National Park Service ==
Director of National Park Service
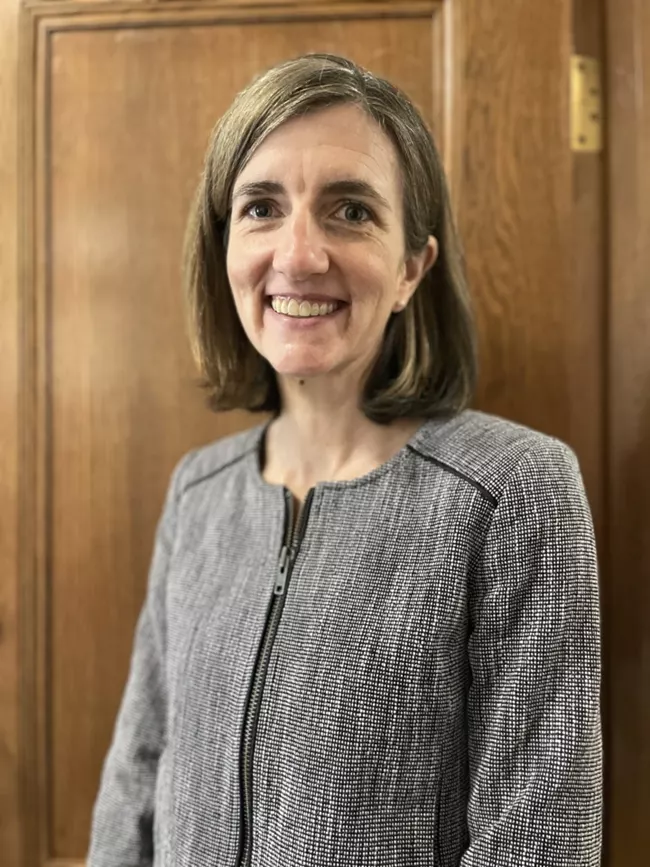
- Incumbent; Jessica Bowron; Acting since January 20, 2025
- Appointer: President of the United States
- Formation: 1917
- First holder: Stephen T. Mather
- Website: nps.gov/aboutus/director.htm

There have been 19 directors (plus several acting directors) of the National Park Service since 1917.

No.	Image	Name	Term of office		Refs
No.	Image	Name	Start	End	Refs
1		Stephen Mather	May 16, 1917	January 8, 1929	
2		Horace M. Albright	January 12, 1929	August 9, 1933	
3		Arno B. Cammerer	August 10, 1933	August 9, 1940	
4		Newton B. Drury	August 20, 1940	March 31, 1951	
5		Arthur E. Demaray	April 1, 1951	December 8, 1951	
6		Conrad L. Wirth	December 9, 1951	January 7, 1964	
7		George B. Hartzog Jr.	January 9, 1964	December 31, 1972	
8		Ronald H. Walker	January 7, 1973	January 3, 1975	
9		Gary Everhardt	January 13, 1975	May 27, 1977	
10		William J. Whalen III	July 5, 1977	May 13, 1980	
11		Russell E. Dickenson	May 15, 1980	March 3, 1985	
12		William Penn Mott Jr.	May 17, 1985	April 16, 1989	
13		James M. Ridenour	April 17, 1989	January 20, 1993	
14		Roger G. Kennedy	June 1, 1993	March 29, 1997	
15		Robert Stanton	August 4, 1997	January 2001	
16		Fran P. Mainella	July 18, 2001	October 16, 2006	
17		Mary A. Bomar	October 17, 2006	January 20, 2009	
acting		Daniel Wenk	January 20, 2009	October 2, 2009	
18		Jonathan Jarvis	October 2, 2009	January 3, 2017	
acting		Michael T. Reynolds	January 3, 2017	January 24, 2018	
acting		P. Daniel Smith	January 24, 2018	September 30, 2019	
acting		David Vela	October 1, 2019	August 7, 2020	
acting		Margaret Everson	August 7, 2020	January 20, 2021	
acting		Shawn Benge	January 20, 2021	December 16, 2021	
19		Charles F. Sams III	December 16, 2021	January 20, 2025	
acting		Jessica Bowron	January 20, 2025	Present	

== See also ==
- History of the National Park Service
- Organization of the National Park Service
