= William J. Murtagh =

William J. Murtagh (1923–2018) was an American historian who served as the first "Keeper of the Records" for the National Register of Historic Places. He was a significant supporter of historic preservation and set many standards for it in the United States. Murtagh published Keeping Time: The History and Theory of Preservation in the United States. The New York Times characterized Murtagh as, the "Lion of Historic Preservation". He was a native of Philadelphia, Pennsylvania.

== Education ==
Murtagh received undergraduate and graduate degrees from the University of Pennsylvania, including a Ph.D. in architectural history in 1963. He was a Fulbright scholar in Germany.

== Career ==
He studied historic Pennsylvania Dutch barns before becoming the director of the Kemerer Museum of Decorative Arts. He then worked for the National Trust for Historic Preservation as an assistant to the president. During that time, Murtagh served on a committee that created the 1964 publication entitled, A report on Principles and Guidelines for Historic Preservation in the United States. That committee report led to the creation of the National Register of Historic Places when the Historic Preservation Act was passed in 1966 by the United States Congress.

Murtagh was hired as the first Keeper of the National Register of Historic Places and it was established under the National Park Service. He collaborated with the state and local historic preservation officers to oversee the federal program and to gather the first nominations for the national register. The federal program grew rapidly under Murtagh's tenure and encouraged interest in preservation efforts at all other levels. He served as the keeper of the national register until his departure in 1979.

He then helped lead preservation programs at Columbia University and the University of Maryland. Murtagh returned as vice president to the National Trust before moving to the University of Hawaii.

== Retirement ==
Upon retirement, Murtagh divided his time between his residences in Penobscot, Maine, and Sarasota, Florida. He remained as a resource for and active in historic preservation circles. When he died of heart failure in 2018, he was ninety-five years old and at his residence at Plymouth Harbor in Sarasota.
