= William J. Whalen III =

Director of the National Park Service (1940-2006)

William J. Whalen
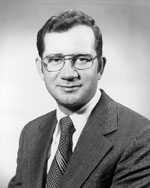
- William Whalen

10th Director of the National Park Service
- In office July 5, 1977 – May 13, 1980
- President: Jimmy Carter
- Preceded by: Gary Everhardt
- Succeeded by: Russell E. Dickenson

Personal details
- Born: July 18, 1940; Pittsburgh, Pennsylvania
- Died: September 28, 2006 (aged 66); Greenbrae, California
- Occupation: Civil servant

William Jerome Whalen III (July 18, 1940 – September 28, 2006) was the 10th director of the United States National Park Service.

Whalen joined the Park Service in 1965 as a Job Corps counselor and advanced to posts in National Capital Parks and Yosemite before becoming superintendent of Golden Gate National Recreation Area in 1972. His experience in the burgeoning urban parks field contributed to his appointment as director in July 1977, yet the most significant event of his tenure was President Jimmy Carter's proclamation of much Alaska wilderness as national monuments in 1978, doubling the area under NPS jurisdiction. Friction with park concessioners led to congressional calls for Whalen's removal in 1980, and Secretary of the Interior Cecil D. Andrus returned him to Golden Gate. He left the NPS in 1983.

A native of Burgettstown, Pennsylvania, Whalen joined the National Park Service as a job corps counselor in 1965 and became well known in Washington, D.C., as manager of the Summer in the Parks Programs. He was deputy superintendent at Yosemite National Park and then managed all NPS areas in the San Francisco Bay Area, including the Golden Gate National Recreation Area. As Director of the NPS he saw the national parks double in area. Management of an expanded system including vast new parks in Alaska challenged his best talents. Whalen later returned to the Bay Area and served as general superintendent of Golden Gate National Recreation Area. He died of a heart attack in 2006. The GGNRA park headquarters, Fort Mason building 201, is named the William J. Whalen Building in his honor.

== See also ==
- National Park Service

Government offices
Preceded by Gary Everhardt	Director of the National Park Service; 1977–1983	Succeeded by Russell E. Dickenson
