= Mosier Valley =

Area of Fort Worth, Texas

Coordinates: 32°48′48″N 97°07′16″W

Mosier Valley is an area of Fort Worth, Texas, located just south of Euless, Texas. It was the first freedmen's town in Tarrant County.

== History ==
Mosier Valley was established in the early 1870s by Robert and Dilsie Johnson, as well as ten other formerly enslaved families. It was an agricultural community, with many residents also working as handymen, sharecroppers, or nannies for residents of neighboring towns Hurst, Euless, and Bedford. In 1874, the Oak Grove Baptist Church was founded, which was later renamed Saint John Missionary Baptist Church. Mosier Valley organized a community school in 1883.

By 1949, the Mosier Valley School had become part of the Euless school district. Then Euless superintendent O.B. Powell determined it would be cheaper to bus Mosier Valley students to Fort Worth schools rather than maintain the Mosier Valley school. Parents of Mosier Valley School children then filed a lawsuit with the help of the National Association for the Advancement of Colored People to block the superintendent's actions. In July 1950, U.S. District Judge Joe Dooley ruled in favor of the Mosier Valley parents, stating Euless’ black school should receive funding equivalent to that of the town's white school. The bond measure to enable said funding was defeated by the white majority. In response, Mosier Valley parents attempted to enroll 35 children in the Euless school on September 4, 1950. A crowd of 150 white residents gathered outside to protest the enrollment of black students. Powell informed black residents that state segregation law superseded all others. In 1968, the Euless district was fully integrated under federal duress, and the Mosier Valley school was closed.

In 1963, the city of Fort Worth annexed Mosier Valley. The city failed to provide residents of the area with basic city services like sewage and water service for almost 40 years.

In 1995, Euless began planning the Texas Star Golf Course on land bordering a portion of Mosier Valley. As most of the land used in planning the golf course was in Fort Worth, Euless had to ask for that city's approval. Using the golf course as leverage, Fort Worth City Manager Bob Terrell convinced the city of Euless to partner on finally installing water and sewer lines in Mosier Valley.

In 2014, the city of Fort Worth began work on the community's first park, Mosier Valley Park. In 2018, the city announced a $73,120 expansion project for the park.
