= Roger G. Kennedy =

American lawyer

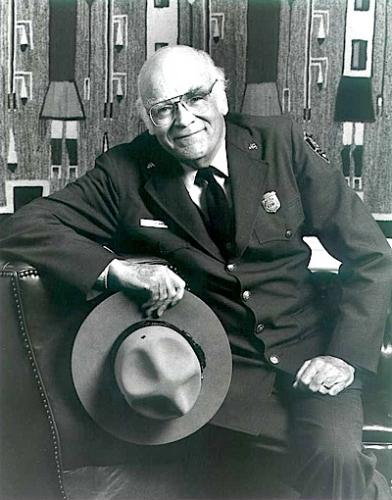

14th Director of the National Park Service
- In office June 1, 1993 – March 29, 1997
- President: Bill Clinton
- Preceded by: James M. Ridenour
- Succeeded by: Robert Stanton

Personal details
- Born: August 3, 1926 St. Paul, Minnesota, U.S.
- Died: September 30, 2011 (aged 85) Rockville, Maryland, U.S.
- Spouse: Frances Kennedy
- Education: University of Minnesota Law School
- Occupation: Banking, television production, historical writing, museum administration

Roger George Kennedy (August 3, 1926 – September 30, 2011) was an American polymath whose career included banking, television production, historical writing, and museum administration, the last as director of the Smithsonian Institution's National Museum of American History, before the Bill Clinton administration selected him to head the National Park Service in 1993. He was especially concerned about expanding the service's educational role and moved to enlarge its presence beyond the parks via the Internet.

== Life and career ==
Kennedy graduated from the University of Minnesota Law School in 1952. He unsuccessfully ran for Congress in 1952 as a Republican, later becoming a Democrat. In 1953, he moved to Washington, D.C. where he worked as a civil trial lawyer with the Department of Justice and served as special assistant to the U.S. Attorney General and to the secretaries of the Department of Labor and the Department of Health, Education, and Welfare. He rose to national notice in 1955 as a news correspondent covering the Supreme Court and the White House for NBC, for which he also wrote and produced television documentaries and hosted a radio program.

Returning to Minnesota in the 1960s, Kennedy worked as a bank chairman in St. Paul and then as vice president for investments for the University of Minnesota, along with being a founder of the Guthrie Theater in Minneapolis. In 1969 the Ford Foundation brought him on as vice president for finance.

The Clinton administration appointed him as Director of the National Park Service in 1993. During his tenure, the NPS restructured its field operations and sharply reduced its central office staffs as part of a government-wide effort to downsize the federal bureaucracy. Kennedy resigned at the end of President Clinton's first term in 1997.

He was married to Frances Kennedy.

He died from melanoma on September 30, 2011, at the age of 85.

He published a favorable study of Aaron Burr—arguing he had a better character than Thomas Jefferson. Burr, Hamilton, and Jefferson: A Study in Character 2000 Oxford University Press.

== Suggested reading ==
"The Human Element" 2001 The George Wright Society. All rights reserved. First published in THE GEORGE WRIGHT FORUM, Volume 18, No. 2.

Government offices
Preceded by James M. Ridenour	Director of the National Park Service; 1993–1997	Succeeded by Robert Stanton
