= Russell E. Dickenson =

American government official

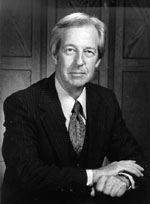
- Russell E. Dickenson
- Born: April 12, 1923; Melissa, Texas
- Died: February 19, 2008 (aged 84); Bellevue, Washington
- Occupation: landscape architect

Russell Errett Dickenson (April 12, 1923 – February 19, 2008) began his National Park Service (NPS) career as a ranger at Grand Canyon National Park in 1946 and served in a wide range of park and central office assignments — most prominently as head of National Capital Parks, deputy director, and Pacific Northwest regional director — before ascending to the directorship in May 1980. Having risen through the traditional ranks and enjoying the respect of his colleagues, Dickenson was enthusiastically welcomed to the job and supported in his effort to restore organizational stability after a succession of short-term directors. As when Walker's deputy, he preferred improving the service's stewardship of its existing parks to seeking new ones. The only Interior Department bureau chief to be retained by the Reagan administration in 1981, Dickenson obtained its support and that of Congress for the Park Restoration and Improvement Program, which devoted more than a billion dollars over five years to park resources and facilities. Dickenson retired in March 1985.

Dickenson was born in 1922. A Marine Corps veteran and graduate of Arizona State College at Flagstaff (now Northern Arizona University), Dickenson worked his way up through the NPS ranks. A native of Melissa, Texas, he began his career in 1947 as a park ranger at Grand Canyon National Park and held field assignments in several other western parks. He also served as chief, Division of Resource Management in the Midwest Regional and in 1967, transferred to WASO as Chief of New Area Studies and Master Planning. He was Regional Director of the National Capital Region from 1969 to 1973 and served as Deputy NPS Director from 1973 to 1975. Before becoming Director in 1980, Dickenson served as Pacific Northwest Regional Director for 4 ½ years. Dickenson has received numerous awards, including the Distinguished Service Award in 1972, for his work in urban park management.

Government offices
Preceded by William J. Whalen	Director of the National Park Service; 1983–1985	Succeeded by William Penn Mott Jr.
