= George B. Hartzog Jr. =

American government official

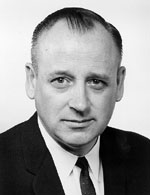

7th Director of the National Park Service
- In office January 9, 1964 – December 31, 1972
- President: Lyndon B. Johnson; Richard Nixon
- Preceded by: Conrad L. Wirth
- Succeeded by: Ronald H. Walker

Personal details
- Born: March 17, 1920 Smoaks, South Carolina
- Died: June 27, 2008 (aged 88) Washington, D.C.
- Spouse: Helen Hartzog (m. 1947)
- Occupation: Lawyer, conservationist

George Benjamin Hartzog Jr. (March 17, 1920 – June 27, 2008) was an American attorney and Director of the National Park Service.

== Early life and career ==
Admitted to the bar in South Carolina in 1942, he became an attorney for the General Land Office (now the Bureau of Land Management) in the Department of the Interior in 1945, and six months later transferred to the National Park Service.

He moved to field assignments at Great Smoky Mountains and Rocky Mountain National Parks, and then made his name advancing the Gateway Arch project as superintendent of Gateway Arch National Park (then known as Jefferson National Expansion Memorial) from 1959 to 1962. After briefly leaving the service, Hartzog returned as associate director in 1963 with the promise of succeeding Conrad Wirth in January 1964. As Director, he served as Stewart Udall’s right arm in achieving a remarkably productive legislative program that included 62 new parks, the National Historic Preservation Act of 1966, and the Bible amendment to the Alaska Native Claims Settlement Act that led to establishment of the Alaska parks. He ordered the Yosemite Firefall tradition discontinued in 1968. During his nine-year tenure, he enlarged the service's role in urban recreation, historic preservation, interpretation, and environmental education.

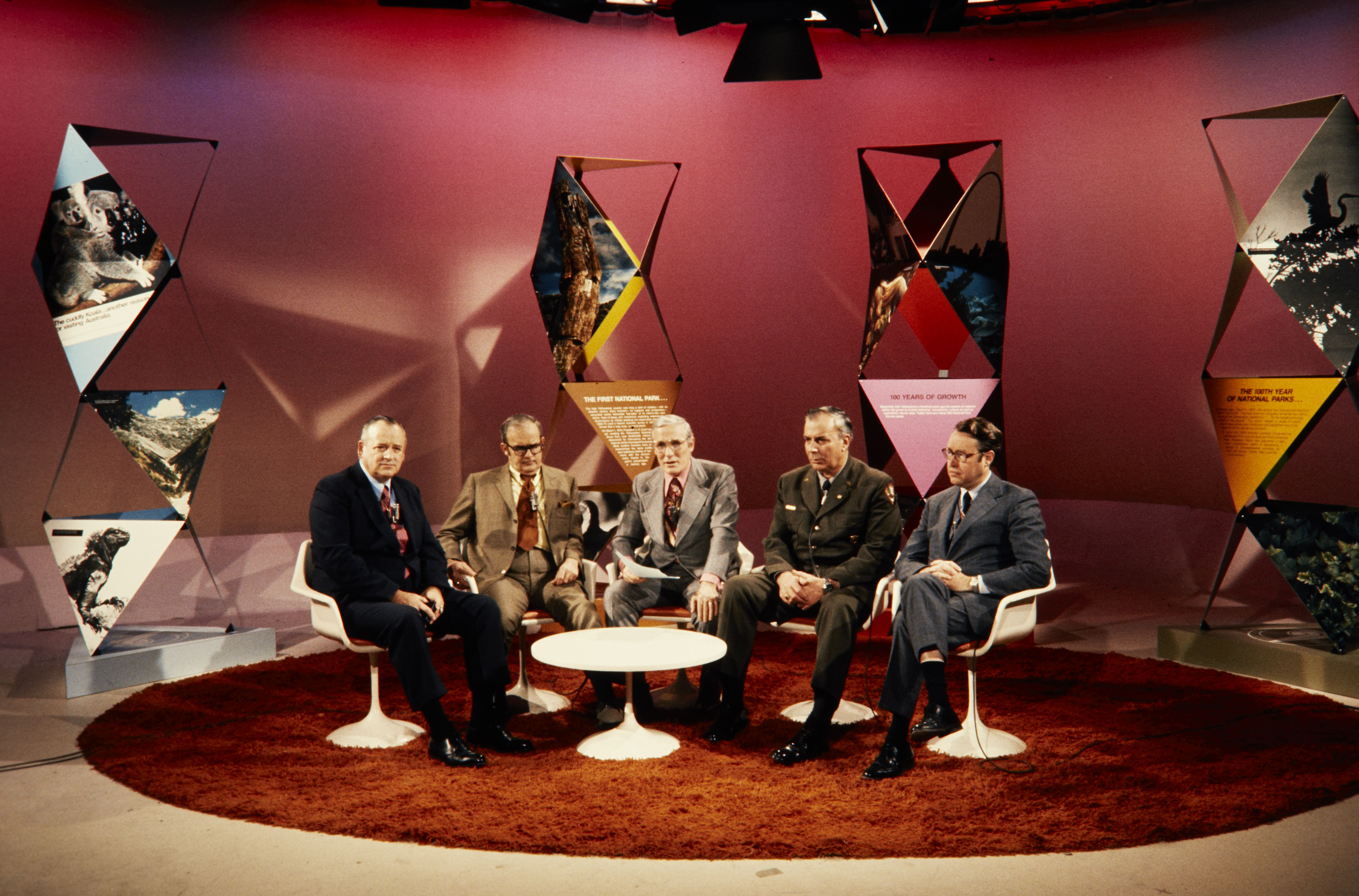
NPS staff sitting on the set for the 1972 Centennial for the creation of the first National Park, in a NBC Today Show. George Hartzog is the first from left.

In 1969, NPS faced budget cuts. Harzog pioneered what became known as the Washington Monument syndrome political tactic and closed all national parks two days a week. As public outcry grew, Congress restored the funding.

=== Dismissal by Richard Nixon and later life ===
Florida banker Charles "Bebe" Rebozo, a close friend of Richard Nixon, encouraged the president to fire Hartzog in retaliation for receiving "a ticket from a park ranger in Biscayne National Park for [Rebozo] tying his boat illegally to an NPS administrative dock there." Nixon fired Hartzog in December 1972, despite attempts by Secretary of the Interior Rogers Morton to talk the president out of his decision.

Nixon opted to replace Hartzog with the White House head of travel arrangement Ron Walker, an "unqualified appointment" who openly admitted "that he did not know the difference between the National Park Service and the Boy Scouts." Former National Park Service director Jonathan B. Jarvis has credited Rebozo with indirectly bringing about the overly-politicized era of the Parks program administration, wherein NPS directors are expected to resign with the election of each new president. Rebozo's influence on Nixon's firing of Hartzog has also been noted in Dr. Gil Lusk's 2019 book National Parks: Our Living National Treasures and A Conservative Environmentalist: The Life and Career of Frank Masland Jr.

Following his dismissal, Hartzog practiced law in Washington, D.C.

== Death ==
Hartzog died on June 27, 2008. Upon his death, National Park Service historian Robert Utley called Hartzog "the greatest director in the history of the service" and "an empire builder."

Government offices
Preceded by Conrad L. Wirth	Director of the National Park Service; 1964–1972	Succeeded by Ronald H. Walker
