= List of Florida state parks =

Florida State Parks
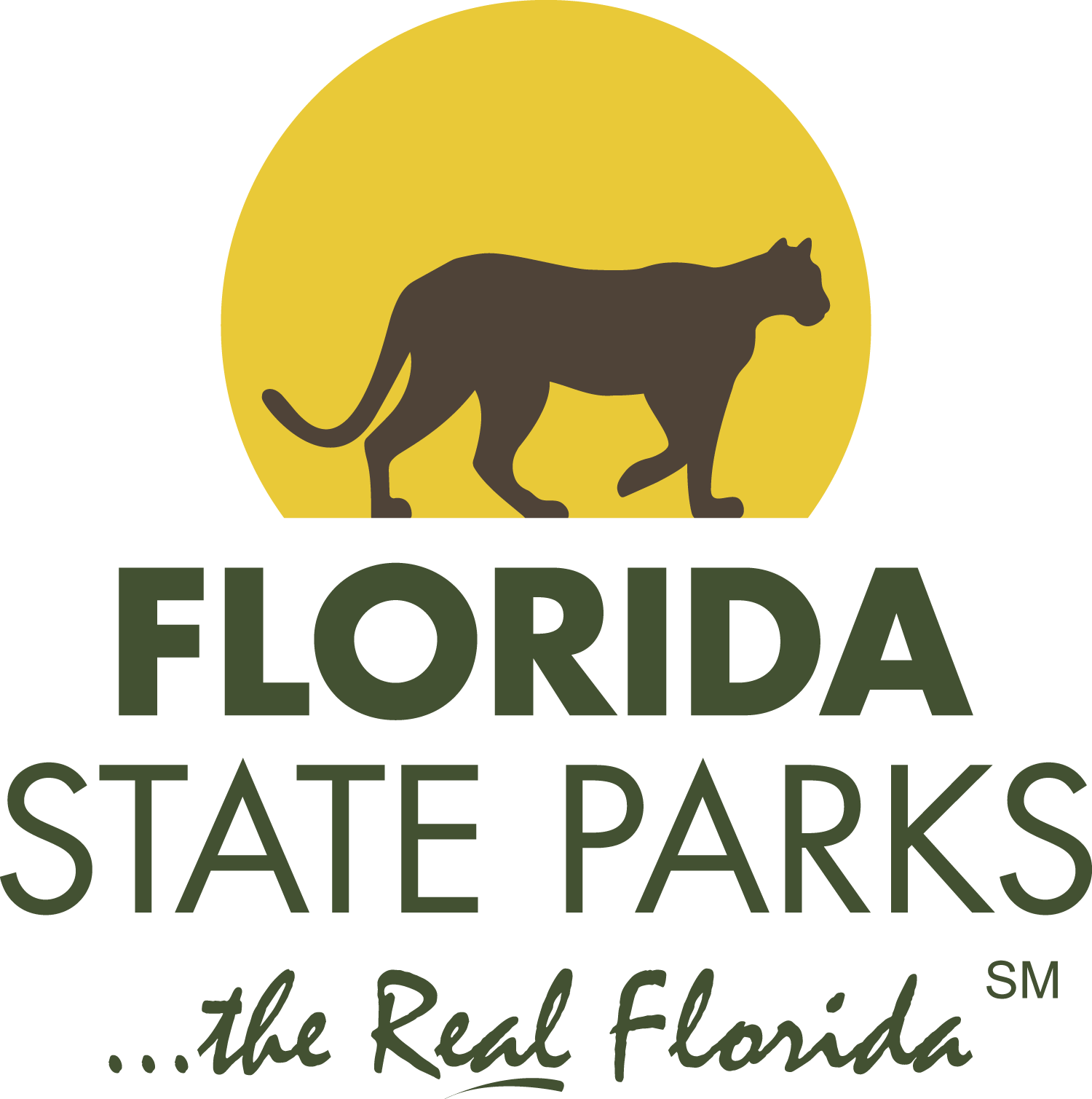
- Logo of the Florida State Parks
- Area: More than 819,000 acres (331,000 ha)
- Established: 1935; 91 years ago
- Visitors: 28 million (in 2024–25)
- Governing body: Florida Department of Environmental Protection, Division of Recreation and Parks
- Website: www.floridastateparks.org

The Florida state park system consists of 176 units managed by the Florida Park Service (FPS), a division of the Florida Department of Environmental Protection. It encompasses more than 819,000 acres (331,000 ha) distributed across 63 of Florida's 67 counties.

Established in 1935, the system ranges from pre-Columbian archaeological sites to first-magnitude springs, coral reefs, and roadless barrier islands accessible only by boat. Thirteen units contain National Natural Landmarks. Several parks began as private tourist attractions: Homosassa Springs and Rainbow Springs became state parks around 1990, Weeki Wachee Springs in 2008, and Silver Springs in 2013. The newest unit in the Florida park system is Shoal River Headwaters State Park in Walton County, which was acquired on October 7, 2025, and opened to the public on January 23, 2026.

In fiscal year 2024–25, more than 28 million people visited the state parks and trails, generating over $75 million in revenue from user fees and concessions. The division had about 1,040 full-time-equivalent positions and was supported by 30,880 volunteers, while 80 citizen support organizations contributed $5.3 million in capital improvements, equipment, and maintenance. The Florida Park Service was the first state park system to win the National Recreation and Park Association's National Gold Medal Award for Excellence in Park and Recreation Management four times, in 1999, 2005, 2013, and 2019.

As of the Florida Park Service's July 2026 jurisdiction report, the system has 57 state parks, 34 state recreation areas, 28 state preserves, 20 historic sites, (Note: The report's covering memo gives 21 historic sites; its unit-by-unit table lists 20.) 10 state trails, and 27 units in smaller classifications such as museums, archaeological sites, and ornamental gardens. The system's history, including the racial segregation of its parks until the mid-1960s, is covered at Florida Park Service. That article also covers Royal Palm State Park, which was never run by the park service: the Florida Federation of Women's Clubs ran it from 1916 until 1947, when it became part of Everglades National Park.

== Interactive map ==
Boundaries of Florida state parks, trails, and preserves

== Parks and other units ==
Florida state park units, as of July 1, 2026
Park name	Image	Acquired (Note: Date the state of Florida acquired the parcel that forms the unit's initial area; later additions to a unit are not reflected.)	County and location	Area (Note: Areas cover all land and water the park service manages for each unit, which for coastal and riverine units includes leased submerged land and can exceed the park's upland area.)	Notable feature
Addison Blockhouse Historic State Park	Man standing beside a low stone ruin wall overgrown with vines beneath moss-draped oaks	January 12, 1945	Volusia; 29.3322°N 81.0956°W	147.93 acres (59.9 ha)	Coquina ruins of an 1816 plantation kitchen fortified as "Camp M'Rae" during the Second Seminole War; the park is not open to the public
Alafia River State Park	American alligator basking on a grassy bank beside dark water	December 19, 1996	Hillsborough; 27.7735°N 82.1201°W	7,717.8 acres (3,123 ha)	A reclaimed phosphate mine whose mining left some of the most radical elevation changes in Florida, making it a hot spot for mountain biking
Alfred B. Maclay Gardens State Park	Yellow irises fringing a green pond, with blooming azaleas and a path beyond	March 31, 1953	Leon; 30.5286°N 84.2602°W	1,170.19 acres (474 ha)	Ornamental gardens of azaleas, camellias, and other plants designed and built by Alfred B. Maclay, who bought the plantation in 1923 and used it mainly as a winter retreat; the park was listed on the National Register of Historic Places in 2002 as the Killearn Plantation Archeological and Historic District
Allen David Broussard Catfish Creek Preserve State Park	Tall pine standing over sandy scrub beside a white sand road	December 20, 1991	Polk; 27.9775°N 81.4528°W	8,403.66 acres (3,401 ha)	Part of the Florida Forever Catfish Creek project, which protects Lake Wales Ridge scrub; imperiled species include the Florida scrub jay, Florida sand skink, and blue calamintha bee
Amelia Island State Park	Bare weathered tree standing in the surf on a beach at twilight	July 15, 1983	Nassau; 30.5204°N 81.4393°W	235.68 acres (95.4 ha)	South end of Amelia Island, Florida's northernmost barrier island, preserving beach dune, maritime hammock, flatwoods, and wetlands; a stable concession leads horseback tours along the Atlantic beach
Anastasia State Park	Close-up of a wood stork's dark bald head and long bill above white plumage	March 31, 1949	St. Johns; 29.8856°N 81.2791°W	1,593.17 acres (645 ha)	Contains the NRHP-listed Spanish Coquina Quarries, the main source of the coquina used to build the Castillo de San Marcos (begun in 1672) and other buildings in Spanish colonial St. Augustine
Anclote Key Preserve State Park	Iron skeletal lighthouse tower rising behind two keeper's houses and palms	April 1, 1960	Pasco, Pinellas; 28.1776°N 82.8402°W	12,209.61 acres (4,941 ha)	Barrier islands 3 miles (4.8 km) offshore near Tarpon Springs; the 110-foot (34 m) Anclote Key Lighthouse was first built in 1887, and Three Rooker Island is a nesting site for the American oystercatcher and a wintering site for the piping plover
Atlantic Ridge Preserve State Park	Flooded wet prairie with scattered pines and palms under a cloud-flecked sky	December 6, 2000	Martin; 27.0935°N 80.2131°W	4,886.06 acres (1,977 ha)	Mostly mesic flatwoods and depression marsh, with hydric hammock lining a blackwater stream in the St. Lucie River system; habitat for the Florida sandhill crane and wood stork
Avalon State Park	Empty sand beach with breaking surf and a large cumulus cloud offshore	December 12, 1985	St. Lucie; 27.5439°N 80.3248°W	657.58 acres (266.1 ha)	Atlantic beach where the U.S. Navy trained landing craft crews and its new frogmen, forerunners of the Navy SEALs, during World War II; submerged obstacles built for the training remain along the shore
Bahia Honda State Park	Orange sunset over open water, with a low bridge silhouetted on the horizon	September 21, 1961	Monroe; 24.6664°N 81.2623°W	496.74 acres (201.0 ha)	Site of the 1999 discovery of a Miami blue butterfly population, after the species was believed extirpated from the Keys; the Old Bahia Honda Bridge, built for Henry Flagler's Overseas Railroad, is listed on the NRHP
Bald Point State Park	White sand trail winding through saw palmetto beneath twisted live oaks	September 2, 1999	Franklin; 29.9480°N 84.4046°W	12,154.21 acres (4,919 ha)	Protects 31 recorded archaeological sites, among them the Tucker site midden (8FR4), occupied from the Deptford through the Fort Walton periods and containing 70 human burials
The Barnacle Historic State Park	Two-story house with a red tile roof and wraparound veranda, set on a lawn	June 8, 1973	Miami-Dade; 25.7238°N 80.2420°W	9.59 acres (3.88 ha)	Waterfront home that yacht designer Ralph Middleton Munroe built in 1891 and named The Barnacle, furnished to show his family's life there from 1887 to 1933; listed on the NRHP as the Ralph M. Munroe House
Big Lagoon State Park	White sand shoreline curving along a calm lagoon, backed by tall pines	March 1, 1943	Escambia; 30.3153°N 87.4107°W	706.77 acres (286.0 ha)	A gateway site on the Great Florida Birding and Wildlife Trail; seabirds and shorebirds including the least tern, sandwich tern, and Caspian tern use the park during migration
Big Shoals State Park	Brown colored river rapids churning over dark rock ledges	November 19, 1986	Hamilton, Columbia; 30.3390°N 82.7086°W	1,681.01 acres (680 ha)	Contains the largest whitewater rapids in Florida, where the Suwannee River crosses a limestone outcrop; the shoals are the state's only Class III rapids
Big Talbot Island State Park	Weathered driftwood trees strewn across a beach, framed by a fallen trunk	August 20, 1982	Duval; 30.4805°N 81.4456°W	2,679.39 acres (1,084 ha)	A barrier island preserved from development, known for the sun-bleached skeletons of fallen trees on Boneyard Beach and the exposed hardpan formations of Blackrock Beach
Bill Baggs Cape Florida State Park	White conical lighthouse with a black lantern room rising above palms	March 31, 1966	Miami-Dade; 25.6755°N 80.1591°W	506.37 acres (204.9 ha)	Site of the Cape Florida Lighthouse, first built in 1825; the tower is one of the oldest standing structures in South Florida and is listed on the NRHP
Blackwater River State Park	Flooded river margin with a white sandbar and pine woods beyond	June 14, 1968	Santa Rosa; 30.7074°N 86.8756°W	635.82 acres (257.3 ha)	Certified a Registered State Natural Feature in 1980 for its exceptional illustration of Florida's natural history; one of the largest and oldest Atlantic white cedars grows beside the river and was recognized as a Florida Champion tree in 1982
Blue Spring State Park	Manatees resting in clear spring water below moss-draped trees	August 14, 1972	Volusia; 28.9480°N 81.3411°W	2,659.05 acres (1,076 ha)	Spring run that serves as a winter refuge for the Florida manatee, given legal protection by the Manatee Sanctuary Act of 1978; park staff and researchers count and identify the individual manatees that winter there
Bulow Creek State Park	Salt marsh and open water backed by a hammock of palms and hardwoods	May 20, 1981	Flagler, Volusia; 29.3787°N 81.1155°W	5,698.14 acres (2,306 ha)	Home to the Fairchild Oak, an old-growth live oak estimated to be almost 500 years old, with a trunk circumference of more than 25 feet (7.6 m)
Bulow Plantation Ruins Historic State Park	Roofless coquina sugar mill ruins with a standing arched doorway	January 12, 1945	Flagler; 29.4346°N 81.1427°W	147.97 acres (59.9 ha)	Coquina ruins of the sugar mill of the Bulow family's plantation (1821–1836), destroyed when raids at the outbreak of the Second Seminole War wiped out the area's plantations
Caladesi Island State Park	Two red and yellow kayaks stored on a rack at a dock	April 18, 1966	Pinellas; 28.0210°N 82.8141°W	2,420.04 acres (979 ha)	Undeveloped barrier island reached only by boat, including a ferry from Honeymoon Island State Park; named America's best beach in 2008 by Stephen Leatherman ("Dr. Beach")
Camp Helen State Park	Log lodge with a deep covered porch beneath moss-draped live oaks	June 7, 1996	Bay; 30.2730°N 85.9923°W	223.33 acres (90.4 ha)	Contains the NRHP-listed Camp Helen Historic District, the buildings of a former Avondale Mills employee retreat
Cayo Costa State Park	Curving sand beach along shallow clear water, with dune vegetation behind	December 21, 1976	Lee; 26.6604°N 82.2402°W	2,666.87 acres (1,079 ha)	Barrier island reached only by boat; contains the NRHP-listed Mark Pardo Shellworks, a shell works and midden of the Caloosahatchee culture dating from about 500 to 1500
Cedar Key Museum State Park	Red shingled wooden house with a metal roof and screened porch, raised on piers	June 19, 1960	Levy; 29.1522°N 83.0490°W	18.63 acres (7.54 ha)	Museum displaying the shells, butterflies, prehistoric artifacts, and documents collected by Cedar Key resident St. Clair Whitman, whose house also stands on the grounds; a historic marker commemorates naturalist John Muir's 1867 arrival at Cedar Key at the end of his A Thousand-Mile Walk to the Gulf
Cedar Key Scrub State Reserve	Dense saw palmetto scrub with scattered pines and a standing dead snag	December 27, 1978	Levy; 29.2003°N 83.0302°W	6,784.31 acres (2,746 ha)	Scrub on ancient sand dunes, among the rarest natural communities in Florida; its Florida scrub jays are a declining population at the northern limit of the species' range
Charlotte Harbor Preserve State Park	Sandy two-track road running through cabbage palms and coastal scrub	December 19, 1974	Charlotte, Lee; 26.7858°N 82.1368°W	45,507.16 acres (18,416 ha)	Islands and more than 70 miles (110 km) of shoreline around Charlotte Harbor, within or next to four aquatic preserves (Gasparilla Sound-Charlotte Harbor, Cape Haze, Pine Island Sound, and Matlacha Pass); some of its trails are on the south section of the Great Florida Birding and Wildlife Trail
Cockroach Bay Preserve State Park	Still water lined with mangroves, reflecting the sky	January 24, 1997	Hillsborough; 27.7023°N 82.4928°W	617.89 acres (250.1 ha)	Protects the Little Cockroach Key shell mound and the Cockroach Key Shell Midden, which with nearby Big Cockroach Mound may mark the northernmost extent of the Glades culture, generally found no farther north than Collier County
Collier–Seminole State Park	Large black steel walking dredge displayed behind a fence beneath palms	March 8, 1944	Collier; 25.9756°N 81.6004°W	7,270.8 acres (2,942 ha)	Home to a National Historic Mechanical Engineering Landmark: the Bay City Walking Dredge used to build the Tamiami Trail
Colt Creek State Park	White limerock road beside a green pasture under a darkening sky	May 31, 2006	Polk; 28.2853°N 82.0391°W	5,067.01 acres (2,051 ha)	Lies in the Green Swamp south of the Green Swamp Wilderness Preserve; cypress domes set in pine flatwoods, with improved pastures still grazed by cattle
Constitution Convention Museum State Park	Double row of tall cabbage palms lining a mown lawn that leads to open water	May 12, 1922	Gulf; 29.7932°N 85.2985°W	13.22 acres (5.35 ha)	Museum on the site of the former town of St. Joseph commemorating Florida's first Constitutional Convention (1838–1839), which drafted the constitution admitting Florida to statehood
Crystal River Archaeological State Park	Grass-covered earthen mound with a wooden staircase up its side, beneath moss-draped oaks	August 6, 1962	Citrus; 28.9079°N 82.6367°W	61.48 acres (24.88 ha)	Preserves the Crystal River Site (8CI1), a pre-Columbian ceremonial and burial mound complex designated a National Historic Landmark in 1990 and believed to be one of the longest continuously occupied sites in Florida, with about 2,000 years of settlement
Crystal River Preserve State Park	Dark tidal creek bordered by palms and hardwoods	August 20, 1974	Citrus; 28.8584°N 82.6489°W	27,718.15 acres (11,217 ha)	Protects the lower Crystal River where it mixes with Gulf water, one of Florida's most productive estuaries, with salt marsh, hydric hammock, tidal wetlands, mangroves, and pine flatwoods; Florida manatees live year-round in neighboring Kings Bay
Curry Hammock State Park	Two kayakers paddling a narrow channel through mangroves	September 10, 1991	Monroe; 24.7442°N 80.9890°W	1,055.78 acres (427 ha)	The largest undeveloped parcel in its area of the Keys, with one of the largest rockland hammocks in the middle Florida Keys; hosts the Florida Keys Hawkwatch, which studies the migration of birds of prey over the park
Dade Battlefield Historic State Park	Lettered metal entrance arch on stone piers spanning a park road beneath live oaks	September 29, 1921	Sumter; 28.6522°N 82.1270°W	120.85 acres (48.9 ha)	Preserves the site of Dade's Battle of 1835, which began the Second Seminole War, the longest and costliest American Indian war in U.S. history; a reenactment of the battle is held each January
Dagny Johnson Key Largo Hammock Botanical State Park	Stuccoed archway gatehouse with a red tile roof at a park entrance	July 26, 1982	Monroe; 25.2484°N 80.3177°W	2,601.45 acres (1,053 ha)	Protects the largest remaining contiguous rockland hammock in the continental United States, home to 84 protected plant and animal species, including the Schaus' swallowtail butterfly and the Key Largo woodrat
De Leon Springs State Park	Roped-off swimming area in a clear spring pool, with a tile-roofed pavilion behind	June 1, 1982	Volusia; 29.1410°N 81.3722°W	624.79 acres (252.8 ha)	Spring discharging an average of 16.8 million US gallons (64,000,000 litres) a day into a run that flows west to Lake Woodruff and the Lake Woodruff National Wildlife Refuge; a reconstruction of the 1830s sugar mill, built about 1900 on the original footprint, now houses the Sugar Mill Restaurant
Deer Lake State Park	White coastal dunes with sparse grass, houses on the horizon	February 6, 1996	Walton; 30.3106°N 86.0651°W	2,009.44 acres (813 ha)	Protects Deer Lake, one of three coastal dune lakes in the park, a lake type the Florida Natural Areas Inventory considers globally rare and imperiled; part of the Emerald Coast
Delnor-Wiggins Pass State Park	Leaning shoreline trees over a sand beach beside shallow water	September 8, 1970	Collier; 26.2815°N 81.8284°W	199.73 acres (80.8 ha)	One of the few undeveloped barrier islands in the area, with a subtidal hard-bottom reef just offshore; the beach is an index nesting site used to track Florida's sea turtle nesting population
Devil's Millhopper Geological State Park	Steep forested walls of a sinkhole seen from its rim, with a bare basin floor	December 5, 1973	Alachua; 29.7070°N 82.3952°W	67.24 acres (27.21 ha)	A solution-collapse sinkhole designated a National Natural Landmark in 1974; its exposed limestone layers record north Florida's geology and fossil history, and its cool, waterfall-fed microclimate supports plants more typical of Appalachian ravines
Don Pedro Island State Park	Crushed-shell path running through coastal scrub and saw palmetto	February 15, 1985	Charlotte; 26.8522°N 82.3025°W	253.76 acres (102.7 ha)	Barrier-island beach between Knight Island and Little Gasparilla Island, reachable only by private boat or ferry; loggerhead and green sea turtles nest on the beach, and gopher tortoises live on both the island and the mainland tract
Dr. Julian G. Bruce St. George Island State Park	Long empty sand beach with gentle surf and low dunes	April 17, 1963	Franklin; 29.7212°N 84.7478°W	2,073.24 acres (839 ha)	Occupies the easternmost 9 miles (14 km) of St. George Island, with high dunes and white sand Gulf beaches; it has the second-highest sea turtle nesting of the state parks on the northwest Florida Gulf Coast
Dr. Von D. Mizell-Eula Johnson State Park	Golden sunset clouds over a waterway crossed by a low bridge	August 23, 1973	Broward; 26.0753°N 80.1116°W	344.65 acres (139.5 ha)	Renamed in 2016 for civil rights leaders Dr. Von D. Mizell, who in 1946 petitioned for a public beach for Black residents, and Eula Johnson, who led the July 4, 1961, wade-in on Fort Lauderdale's whites-only beaches; in 1962 a court rejected the city's bid to stop the wade-ins
Dudley Farm Historic State Park	Split-rail fence and open-sided barn on a farmstead beneath a moss-draped oak	June 9, 1983	Alachua; 29.6599°N 82.5427°W	333.46 acres (134.9 ha)	Farm worked by three generations of the Dudley family from the late 1850s to the 1940s, with buildings dating from the 1880s to the 1940s; designated a National Historic Landmark in 2021
Dunns Creek State Park	Wooden boardwalk with railings curving through a shady forest	October 10, 2001	Putnam; 29.5462°N 81.5985°W	6,352.5 acres (2,571 ha)	Pine flatwoods and sandhill above the wide floodplain swamp of Dunns Creek, whose watershed extends to Crescent Lake; named for John Dunn, an attorney and coffee planter who received a land grant in 1765
Econfina River State Park	Close-up of a fiddler crab with one greatly enlarged claw	January 6, 1988	Taylor; 30.0694°N 83.9209°W	4,585.32 acres (1,856 ha)	Coastal park on Florida's Big Bend where the land slopes from pine flatwoods through hammock to a wide salt marsh along the Gulf of Mexico; part of a network of public lands stretching nearly 200 miles (320 km) along the Gulf
Eden Gardens State Park	Wooden boardwalk with railings curving through a shady forest	December 24, 1968	Walton; 30.3714°N 86.1226°W	167.72 acres (67.9 ha)	Centered on the Wesley House, a 19th-century vernacular home remodeled in 1963–1964 as a Neo-Classical Revival "Southern plantation" house and listed on the National Register of Historic Places in 2021; its ornamental gardens were designed by former state park director Emmitt Hill, on Tucker Bayou off Choctawhatchee Bay
Edward Ball Wakulla Springs State Park	Moss-draped cypress trees reflected in still blue water	September 17, 1986	Wakulla; 30.2418°N 84.3028°W	6,779.96 acres (2,744 ha)	Centered on Wakulla Springs, one of the world's largest and deepest freshwater springs, flowing at about 250 million US gallons (950,000,000 litres) a day and a National Natural Landmark since 1966; the spring run was a filming location for Creature from the Black Lagoon (1954) and several 1930s–40s Tarzan films
Egmont Key State Park	Sand beach with a seaweed wrack line beside turquoise water	December 4, 1989	Hillsborough; 27.5908°N 82.7614°W	294.31 acres (119.1 ha)	Island at the mouth of Tampa Bay accessible only by boat, containing the Egmont Key Light, rebuilt in 1858, and the ruins of Fort Dade, a Spanish–American War-era coastal fortification whose community once had more than 300 residents
Ellie Schiller Homosassa Springs Wildlife State Park	Pink flamingo wading in a shallow pool	December 30, 1988	Citrus; 28.8007°N 82.5841°W	200.85 acres (81.3 ha)	Wildlife park built around a first-magnitude spring, rehabilitating and exhibiting native Florida wildlife; a floating underwater observatory, first built in 1964, sits in the main spring pool, which wild manatees enter in winter
Estero Bay Preserve State Park	Expanse of mangrove flats and tidal creeks reaching to a bay and distant skyline	April 27, 1987	Lee; 26.4647°N 81.8917°W	11,382.81 acres (4,606 ha)	Lands along Estero Bay bought to protect the adjacent Estero Bay Aquatic Preserve, Florida's first aquatic preserve (designated 1966), from surrounding development; home to nesting bald eagles and a large colony of gopher tortoises
Fakahatchee Strand Preserve State Park	Cattails in the foreground of an open cypress prairie	June 14, 1974	Collier; 26.0214°N 81.4210°W	80,179.8 acres (32,448 ha)	Contains the Fakahatchee Strand, the largest strand swamp in the world and one of two places where bald cypress and royal palms grow together, with the greatest diversity of orchids in North America (including the ghost orchid) and the most bromeliad species in the United States; its Big Cypress Bend tract, a remnant of old-growth bald cypress, was designated a National Natural Landmark in 1966
Falling Waters State Park	Thin waterfall spilling over a mossy, fern-covered ledge	March 26, 1962	Washington; 30.7284°N 85.5295°W	166.24 acres (67.3 ha)	Florida's highest waterfall drops into a cylindrical sinkhole about 100 feet (30 m) deep and 20 feet (6.1 m) wide, then disappears into the park's network of caves
Fanning Springs State Park	Turquoise spring pool with a roped swimming area and wooden steps	December 2, 1993	Levy; 29.5866°N 82.9332°W	196.63 acres (79.6 ha)	Contains Big Fanning, a historic first-magnitude spring whose average flow fell from 107.5 to 73.5 cubic feet per second after 1998, and the second-magnitude Little Fanning; both flow directly into the Suwannee River
Faver-Dykes State Park	Concrete boat ramp and dock on a tidal creek, with canoes in the foreground	December 28, 1950	St. Johns; 29.6870°N 81.2650°W	6,027.63 acres (2,439 ha)	Flatwoods, hammock, and marsh north of Pellicer Creek, a state canoe trail, within the Guana Tolomato Matanzas National Estuarine Research Reserve; protects Timucuan middens and the site of General Joseph Hernández's early-1800s Buena Suerte Plantation
Fernandina Plaza Historic State Park	Wooden entrance sign bearing the park's name and the old Florida Park Service emblem	December 30, 1941	Nassau; 30.6887°N 81.4566°W	0.8 acres (0.32 ha)	At 0.80 acres (3,200 m^{2}), the smallest unit in the Florida state park system; preserves the plaza of Old Town Fernandina, the last planned Spanish town in North America, and the former parade ground of Fort San Carlos, built in 1816
Florida Caverns State Park	A colorfully lit cave room with numerous stalagmites and stalactites	October 11, 1935	Jackson; 30.8129°N 85.2340°W	1,449.6 acres (587 ha)	Runs the only tours of air-filled limestone caves in Florida; one of the state's nine original New Deal parks developed by the Civilian Conservation Corps and the Works Progress Administration; the cave system was designated a National Natural Landmark in 1977
Forest Capital Museum State Park	Weathered log farmhouse with an external chimney and covered porch	January 11, 1967	Taylor; 30.0804°N 83.5691°W	10.18 acres (4.12 ha)	Museum on north Florida's forestry and turpentine industry, beside a cracker homestead centered on the 1864 Whiddon log cabin and furnished with everyday items of settler life
Fort Clinch State Park	Aerial view of a pentagonal brick fort on a wooded point, with beach and jetties beyond	September 20, 1935	Nassau; 30.6940°N 81.4730°W	2,219.2 acres (898 ha)	Contains Fort Clinch, a brick "Third System" coastal fortification begun in 1847 and never finished, listed on the National Register of Historic Places in 1972; federal troops reoccupied it in 1862, and new elements were added during the Spanish-American War
Fort Cooper State Park	Sandy woodland road with a brown interpretive sign at its edge	December 29, 1970	Citrus; 28.8082°N 82.3041°W	708.05 acres (286.5 ha)	Preserves the site of Fort Cooper on Lake Holathlikaha, built in April 1836 by the 1st Georgia Battalion of Volunteers during the Second Seminole War, where 380 sick and wounded soldiers held out through a 16-day siege; listed on the NRHP in 1972
Fort George Island Cultural State Park	Roofless grey walls of a ruined building beside a road	April 19, 1950	Duval; 30.4249°N 81.4306°W	820.64 acres (332.1 ha)	Fort George Island, with more than 5,000 years of human occupation, including the largest and least disturbed shell ring in the southeastern United States and remains of the Spanish mission San Juan del Puerto; the 1928 Ribault Club, a former winter resort, is the park's visitor center
Fort Mose Historic State Park	Salt marsh stretching to a low wooded island under a hazy sky	October 30, 1989	St. Johns; 29.9295°N 81.3226°W	41.35 acres (16.73 ha)	Site of Fort Mose (Gracia Real de Santa Teresa de Mose), established in 1738 as the first legally sanctioned free Black community in what became the United States; a National Historic Landmark
Fort Pierce Inlet State Park	Sea oats on a low dune above a surf beach	August 10, 1973	St. Lucie; 27.4872°N 80.3085°W	956.66 acres (387.1 ha)	Beach dunes, maritime hammock, and mangrove swamp on the north side of the Fort Pierce Inlet, along Tucker Cove on the Indian River Lagoon; the park was a birthplace and training ground of the Navy frogmen, forerunners of the Navy SEALs
Fort Zachary Taylor Historic State Park	Masonry fort wall rising from a water-filled moat behind coastal scrub	October 7, 1976	Monroe; 24.5465°N 81.8106°W	55.74 acres (22.56 ha)	Contains Fort Zachary Taylor in Key West, a coastal fort begun in 1845 and one of only four Southern forts that stayed in Union hands throughout the American Civil War; designated a National Historic Landmark in 1973
Fred Gannon Rocky Bayou State Park	Wooded shoreline and a small dock across a calm bayou	July 1, 1966	Okaloosa; 30.4961°N 86.4264°W	346.65 acres (140.3 ha)	Former Air Force land on Rocky Bayou used for bombing practice during World War II; a concrete practice bomb displayed along the nature trail is believed to have been dropped by crews training for Lt. Col. James Doolittle's April 1942 raid on Japan
Gamble Rogers Memorial State Recreation Area at Flagler Beach	Long surf beach curving beside a vegetated dune line	October 4, 1954	Flagler; 29.4377°N 81.1108°W	133.71 acres (54.1 ha)	Beach and Intracoastal Waterway park named for the Florida cracker folksinger and storyteller Gamble Rogers, who drowned attempting to rescue a swimmer off the adjacent shoreline
Gasparilla Island State Park	Row of derelict concrete pier pilings offshore beyond a dune of sea oats	May 14, 1983	Lee; 26.7309°N 82.2612°W	130.1 acres (52.6 ha)	Includes the 1890 Port Boca Grande Lighthouse and keeper's residence on the southern tip of Gasparilla Island, listed on the NRHP; loggerhead and green sea turtles, snowy plovers, and least terns nest on its beach
George Crady Bridge Fishing Pier State Park	Paved former roadway with guardrails running out over marsh, now used as a fishing pier	September 14, 2007	Duval, Nassau; 30.5183°N 81.4575°W	110.5 acres (44.7 ha)	Fishing pier on the historic George Crady Bridge over Nassau Sound, one of the most productive fishing areas in northeast Florida; planned and managed with Amelia Island State Park
Grayton Beach State Park	White sand beach meeting turquoise water	September 21, 1964	Walton; 30.3361°N 86.1578°W	2,186.6 acres (885 ha)	Named the top beach in the United States by "Dr. Beach" (Stephen Leatherman) in 1994 and again in 2020; borders three coastal dune lakes, with most of Western Lake inside the park
Haw Creek Preserve State Park	A calm creek flows between banks of lush green forests.	December 2, 1976	Flagler, Putnam, Volusia; 29.3861°N 81.4230°W	3,061.67 acres (1,239 ha)	About 3,000 acres (1,200 ha) of floodplain swamp and basin marsh along the lower reaches of Haw Creek, protecting water quality in the Crescent Lake–Haw Creek watershed of the St. Johns River basin; donated by The Nature Conservancy in 1976
Henderson Beach State Park	Clump of sea oats on a white sand beach beside green water	February 2, 1983	Okaloosa; 30.3847°N 86.4425°W	251.46 acres (101.8 ha)	More than a mile of uninterrupted white sand beach and active dunes on the Emerald Coast in Destin, with sand pine scrub that is becoming scarce outside protected areas
Highlands Hammock State Park	Shingled building on a stone foundation among mossy oaks	July 31, 1935	Highlands, Hardee; 27.4504°N 81.5350°W	9,237.74 acres (3,738 ha)	Opened as a private park in 1931 and placed in state custody in 1935; most of its rustic buildings were built by the Civilian Conservation Corps in the 1930s, and it was NRHP-listed in 2018
Hillsborough River State Park	River shoals running over limestone beside a large buttressed cypress	June 10, 1936	Hillsborough; 28.1208°N 82.2587°W	3,319.21 acres (1,343 ha)	Contains Fort Foster State Historic Site, a replica of the fort built during the Second Seminole War to defend the bridge carrying the Fort King Military Road across the Hillsborough River
Honeymoon Island State Park	Sea oats silhouetted against a pink sunset over the beach	December 23, 1974	Pinellas; 28.0751°N 82.8287°W	2,824.52 acres (1,143 ha)	Formed when the 1921 Tampa Bay hurricane cut through the original barrier island, then called Hog Island, opening the channel between what became Honeymoon and Caladesi islands; the park has averaged about 1.27 million visitors a year
Hontoon Island State Park	Two sandhill cranes standing in front of dense saw palmetto	May 12, 1967	Volusia, Lake; 28.9653°N 81.3630°W	1,653.83 acres (669 ha)	Island in the St. Johns River reached by park ferry; replicas of a large owl totem and smaller otter and pelican carvings, made more than 600 years ago and recovered from a submerged archaeological site, stand near the picnic area
Hugh Taylor Birch State Park	Massive banyan tree with curtains of aerial roots spreading over a clearing	December 31, 1941	Broward; 26.1454°N 80.1050°W	162.54 acres (65.8 ha)	Barrier-island park between the Atlantic Ocean and the Intracoastal Waterway in Fort Lauderdale, with the last remaining tropical maritime hammock in South Florida; Chicago attorney Hugh Taylor Birch left his estate for a public park, which opened in 1949
Ichetucknee Springs State Park	Cypress trunks along a clear spring run in dense forest	January 6, 1970	Columbia, Suwannee; 29.9756°N 82.7629°W	2,531.97 acres (1,025 ha)	Contains eight major springs, including the headspring, and 3.5 miles (5.6 km) of the spring-fed Ichetucknee River, the focus of the park's designation as a National Natural Landmark in 1971 and long popular for tubing
Ichetucknee Trace	Canopy of Spanish moss filled oaks against an overcast sky	September 7, 2000	Columbia; 30.0449°N 82.7232°W (Note: Point coordinate is the center of the unit's boundary polygon in the Florida Department of Environmental Protection state park boundary layer; these units are linear or dispersed and have no single central point.)	822.29 acres (332.8 ha)	Tract along the Ichetucknee Trace, a former stream valley of the Ichetucknee River above an underground conduit that feeds Ichetucknee Springs State Park; acquired in 2000 and 2001 with Preservation 2000 and Florida Forever funds to keep mining from contaminating the springs
Indian Key Historic State Park	Small low wooded island on the horizon across calm open water	December 28, 1970	Monroe; 24.8835°N 80.6775°W	111.33 acres (45.1 ha)	Small, uninhabited island in the middle Florida Keys; from 1820 to 1840 a trading post and the base of Jacob Housman's ship-salvaging business, where botanist Henry Perrine grew tropical plants, until a Seminole raid in August 1840 destroyed the settlement
Indian River Lagoon Preserve State Park	Sun setting behind a mangrove shoreline across the lagoon	September 29, 2000	Brevard; 27.9356°N 80.5022°W	564.01 acres (228.2 ha)	Barrier-island land on the Indian River Lagoon, one of the country's most productive and diverse estuaries, bought from 2000 through the Indian River Lagoon Blueways land program; once the site of one of the last barrier-island citrus groves
John D. MacArthur Beach State Park	Beach with a seaweed wrack line and low green dune plants	July 7, 1981	Palm Beach; 26.8261°N 80.0428°W	436.39 acres (176.6 ha)	Barrier-island park with a boardwalk across the estuary of Lake Worth Cove and Munyon Island, site of the Hygeia Hotel, an early-1900s resort; the state received the land in 1981 from the John D. and Catherine T. MacArthur Foundation
John Gorrie Museum State Park	Replica ice-making machine with a timber frame, flywheel, and brick base, on museum display	April 15, 1955	Franklin; 29.7250°N 84.9856°W	0.96 acres (0.39 ha)	Commemorates John Gorrie, an Apalachicola physician and pioneer of air conditioning who received the first U.S. patent for mechanical refrigeration in 1851
John Pennekamp Coral Reef State Park	School of yellow-striped fish over an encrusted shipwreck underwater	December 3, 1959	Monroe; 25.1803°N 80.3265°W	63,881.38 acres (25,852 ha)	Established in 1959 as the first undersea park in the United States, covering about 72 square nautical miles (250 km^{2}) of the Florida Reef off Key Largo, the only living coral reef in the continental United States
Jonathan Dickinson State Park	Sandhill crane with a red crown foraging on open ground	June 9, 1947	Martin; 27.0086°N 80.1390°W	10,441.68 acres (4,226 ha)	Crossed by the Loxahatchee River, designated a National Wild and Scenic River in 1985; also contains the remains of Camp Murphy, a World War II U.S. Army radar training base
Judah P. Benjamin Confederate Memorial at Gamble Plantation Historic State Park	White two-story Greek Revival mansion with tall columns and a second-floor balcony	June 18, 1926	Manatee; 27.5278°N 82.5268°W	33.04 acres (13.37 ha)	Preserves the Gamble Mansion, a Greek Revival plantation house of tabby built between 1845 and 1850, where Confederate Secretary of State Judah P. Benjamin hid while planning his escape at the end of the American Civil War; NRHP-listed in 1970
Kissimmee Prairie Preserve State Park	Lone spreading oak standing on open prairie under a blue sky	March 28, 1997	Okeechobee, Osceola; 27.5815°N 81.0679°W	58,119.55 acres (23,520 ha)	Protects the largest remaining tract of Florida dry prairie, a natural community found nowhere else; in 2016 it became Florida's first International Dark Sky Park, with one of the darkest night skies in the eastern United States
Koreshan State Historic Site	Two-story unpainted wooden house with a porch, surrounded by palms	November 2, 1961	Lee; 26.4353°N 81.8167°W	196.16 acres (79.4 ha)	Contains the Koreshan Unity Settlement Historic District, listed on the National Register of Historic Places in 1976, preserving the buildings and landscaped grounds of a late-19th-century utopian community whose last members donated the land to the state in 1961
Lafayette Blue Springs State Park	Spring pool ringed by exposed limestone banks, with wooden stairs at one side	June 1, 2005	Lafayette; 30.1487°N 83.2357°W	713.91 acres (288.9 ha)	Contains Lafayette Blue Spring, a first-magnitude spring flowing into the Suwannee River, whose run passes under a 20-foot (6.1 m)-wide natural limestone bridge just below the headspring
Lake Griffin State Park	Mist rising from the water beside a small boathouse at dawn	October 31, 1946	Lake; 28.8618°N 81.8938°W	620.66 acres (251.2 ha)	Contains the second-largest live oak in Florida, estimated at 300 to 500 years old and a statewide landmark
Lake Jackson Mounds Archaeological State Park	Low tree-covered earthen mound at the edge of a mown lawn	May 26, 1966	Leon; 30.5011°N 84.3146°W	199.81 acres (80.9 ha)	Preserves six earthen mounds of the Lake Jackson site (8LE1), the largest Mississippian mound complex within 200 kilometres (120 mi) and part of the Southeastern Ceremonial Complex, occupied c. 1050–1500 and NRHP-listed in 1971
Lake June-in-Winter Scrub State Park	Close-up of a yellow four-petalled primrose willow flower	November 15, 1995	Highlands; 27.2956°N 81.4193°W	845.67 acres (342.2 ha)	Protects scrub habitat for some of Florida's rarest species, including the Florida scrub jay, Florida scrub lizard, Florida mouse, gopher tortoise, and eastern indigo snake
Lake Kissimmee State Park	Narrow channel winding through marsh and young cypress under cumulus clouds	January 7, 1970	Polk; 27.9407°N 81.3685°W	5,893.23 acres (2,385 ha)	Contains the "1876 Cow Camp", a living-history site on a late-19th-century ranch where staff portray Florida cow hunters with herds of cracker cattle and cracker horses on weekends and holidays from October through May
Lake Louisa State Park	Moss-draped cypress trees against a pink and blue sunset sky	August 29, 1973	Lake; 28.4470°N 81.7411°W	4,608.07 acres (1,865 ha)	Contains six lakes and parts of four others on the northeastern edge of the Green Swamp, where four major rivers originate; the park is an important part of central Florida's aquifer recharge system
Lake Manatee State Park	Cabbage palm and low scrub above a shoreline, with towering clouds beyond	June 16, 1970	Manatee; 27.4784°N 82.3372°W	548.85 acres (222.1 ha)	Conservation land along the shore of Lake Manatee, a reservoir formed by a 1967 dam on the Manatee River that supplies drinking water to Manatee and Sarasota counties
Lake Talquin State Park	Broad lake seen between moss-draped trees from a wooded bank	December 15, 1970	Leon; 30.4244°N 84.5660°W	490.45 acres (198.5 ha)	Sits on Lake Talquin, a reservoir formed in 1927 when the Ochlockonee River was dammed at Jackson Bluff for hydroelectric power; restoration of the park's longleaf pine and wiregrass benefits the gopher tortoise
Letchworth-Love Mounds Archaeological State Park	Large tree-covered earthen mound rising behind a mown clearing	June 30, 1992 (Note: The division's 2026 jurisdiction report gives the acquisition date as June 20, 1992.)	Jefferson; 30.5179°N 83.9903°W	190.11 acres (76.9 ha)	Contains the Letchworth Mound (8JE337), Florida's tallest Native American ceremonial mound, about 51 feet (16 m) tall and 300 feet (91 m) wide at its base
Lignumvitae Key Botanical State Park	Shallow turquoise water off a rocky shore, with a low key on the horizon	March 2, 1971	Monroe; 24.9034°N 80.6844°W	10,724.24 acres (4,340 ha)	Island reached only by boat, preserving undisturbed rockland hammock with nine national champion trees and a large population of its namesake lignum vitae; guided tours start at the 1919 Matheson House; designated a National Natural Landmark in 1968
Little Manatee River State Park	Concrete stairs and stone retaining wall on a dark, tree-lined river	August 2, 1974	Hillsborough; 27.6732°N 82.3707°W	2,499.38 acres (1,011 ha)	The Little Manatee River, one of the most pristine blackwater streams in Hillsborough County, runs through the park for about 5 miles (8.0 km) of a designated state paddling trail
Little Talbot Island State Park	Grassy dunes and white sand, with a boardwalk crossing in the distance	June 5, 1951	Duval; 30.4553°N 81.4153°W	1,531.38 acres (620 ha)	One of the last undeveloped barrier islands on Florida's Atlantic coast, with more than 5 miles (8.0 km) of beach, maritime hammock, and coastal strand; three species of sea turtles nest on its beaches, and nearly 50 migratory shorebird species use the island
Long Key State Park	Frigatebirds circling above a low mangrove island across turquoise water	September 21, 1961	Monroe; 24.8170°N 80.8083°W	1,001.76 acres (405 ha)	Site of Henry Flagler's Long Key Fishing Camp, a luxury resort that drew wealthy visitors from around the world until the 1935 Labor Day hurricane destroyed it
Lovers Key State Park	Three laughing gulls in flight above dune grasses	August 18, 1983	Lee; 26.3912°N 81.8691°W	1,442.44 acres (584 ha)	Spread over four islands (Lovers Key, Inner Key, Long Key, and Black Island), three of them linked by footbridges and a park tram; bald eagles feed in its lagoons, West Indian manatees live in the nearshore waters, and sea turtles nest on the beach
Lower Wekiva River Preserve State Park	Great blue heron lifting off from the edge of a dark river	August 19, 1976	Lake, Seminole; 28.9040°N 81.3877°W	17,376.26 acres (7,032 ha)	More than three-quarters wetland, mainly floodplain swamp and hydric hammock shaped by floods on the Wekiva and St. Johns rivers; part of the Wekiva River basin parks, which protect a nationally designated Wild and Scenic River and a wildlife corridor to the Ocala National Forest used by the Florida black bear
Madira Bickel Mound State Archaeological Site	Old wooden staircase climbing a wooded slope	April 16, 1948	Manatee; 27.5659°N 82.5922°W	9.19 acres (3.72 ha)	Preserves the Madira Bickel Mound, a Native American mound occupied from the Weeden Island period through the Safety Harbor culture; the first archaeological site designated by the state of Florida
Madison Blue Spring State Park	Gravel parking area at a park entrance, with a wooden sign and flagpole	September 26, 2002	Madison; 30.4786°N 83.2452°W	49.73 acres (20.13 ha)	Contains Madison Blue Spring, a first-magnitude spring that rises in a karst bowl and flows 150 feet (46 m) to the Withlacoochee River
Manatee Springs State Park	Underwater view of eelgrass and algae-covered rock in blue-green spring water	January 6, 1949	Levy; 29.4949°N 82.9703°W	2,452.83 acres (993 ha)	Contains Manatee Spring, one of the largest first-magnitude springs in the lower Suwannee River basin and a refuge for West Indian manatees, at the end of 6.3 miles (10.1 km) of mapped underwater caves; William Bartram described his visit in 1774; designated a National Natural Landmark in 1971
Marjorie Kinnan Rawlings Historic State Park	Weathered wooden barn with a metal roof, with a citrus tree in the foreground	July 1, 1970	Alachua; 29.4809°N 82.1586°W	124.31 acres (50.3 ha)	Preserves the Cross Creek farmhouse where Marjorie Kinnan Rawlings lived and worked from 1928 to 1953 and wrote her Pulitzer Prize-winning novel The Yearling; designated a National Historic Landmark in 2006
Mike Roess Gold Head Branch State Park	Young pine beside a lake with a wooded far shore under a cloudy sky	January 11, 1935	Clay; 29.8369°N 81.9501°W	2,366.87 acres (958 ha)	One of Florida's original state parks, developed by the Civilian Conservation Corps in the 1930s and dedicated in 1939; protects the largest steephead ravine system in northeast Florida, where spring vents feed Gold Head Branch
Mound Key Archaeological State Park	Old sepia picture of a brush-covered shell mound with a path climbing its side	November 2, 1961	Lee; 26.4224°N 81.8641°W	127.85 acres (51.7 ha)	Widely believed to have been the capital of the Calusa, where Spanish governor Pedro Menéndez de Avilés met the Calusa king Carlos in 1566; the island was built up from shell middens, with mounds rising more than 30 feet (9.1 m) above Estero Bay
Myakka River State Park	Wide open marsh prairie stretching to the horizon	June 23, 1936	Manatee, Sarasota; 27.2263°N 82.2666°W	37,197.68 acres (15,053 ha)	One of Florida's oldest and largest state parks, covering 58 square miles (150 km^{2}) along the Myakka River, Florida's first state-designated wild and scenic river; a canopy walkway gives views across the prairie
Natural Bridge Battlefield Historic State Park	Stone obelisk monument on a paved plaza with low markers on either side, backed by pines	March 8, 1950	Leon; 30.3006°N 84.1351°W	2,121.37 acres (858 ha)	Site of the March 6, 1865, Battle of Natural Bridge, the second-largest Civil War battle in Florida, where Confederate soldiers, old men, and young boys turned back a Union advance and kept Tallahassee the only Confederate capital east of the Mississippi never captured
Ney Landrum State Park	Shingled information kiosk and interpretive panels near a split-rail fence in pine flatwoods	December 21, 2006	Jefferson, Leon; 30.3917°N 84.0845°W	2,590.01 acres (1,048 ha)	Formerly St. Marks River Preserve State Park, renamed by state law in 2025 for Ney Landrum, director of Florida's state parks from 1970 to 1989; protects the headwaters of the St. Marks River, with floodplain forest, flatwoods, and sandhills
North Peninsula State Park	Breaking surf on a wide beach seen over a low vegetated dune	May 16, 1984	Volusia; 29.4086°N 81.0967°W	556.07 acres (225.0 ha)	Barrier island between the Atlantic Ocean and the Halifax River, with beach dune, coastal strand, maritime hammock, and salt marsh; habitat for the Florida scrub jay and gopher tortoise, and part of the range of the pallid beach mouse, now presumed extinct
Ochlockonee River State Park	Sand road running through open pine flatwoods	May 14, 1970	Wakulla; 30.0034°N 84.4862°W	546.45 acres (221.1 ha)	Longleaf pine flatwoods at the confluence of the Ochlockonee and Dead rivers, kept by decades of prescribed burning as an excellent example of flatwoods management; habitat for the endangered red-cockaded woodpecker, the gopher tortoise, and the flatwoods salamander
Okeechobee Battlefield Historic State Park	Stone monument bearing a bronze plaque, with two low markers on a lawn	June 30, 2006	Okeechobee; 27.2130°N 80.7849°W	145.32 acres (58.8 ha)	Site of the Battle of Lake Okeechobee on December 25, 1837, in which more than 1,000 U.S. soldiers under Colonel Zachary Taylor fought several hundred Seminole and Miccosukee warriors in a turning point of the Second Seminole War; a National Historic Landmark since 1961 and NRHP-listed in 1966
O'Leno State Park	Wooden suspension footbridge crossing a river between wooded banks	September 4, 1934	Alachua, Columbia; 29.9136°N 82.5778°W	2,372.41 acres (960 ha)	One of Florida's nine original state parks, developed in the 1930s by the Civilian Conservation Corps and the Works Progress Administration on the site of the mill town of Leno; the Santa Fe River disappears into the River Sink here and flows underground for more than 3 miles (4.8 km) before re-emerging at neighboring River Rise Preserve State Park
Oleta River State Park	Mangrove lagoon framed by palms, with high-rise towers on the skyline beyond	June 9, 1980	Miami-Dade; 25.9165°N 80.1387°W	1,032.78 acres (418 ha)	Considered Florida's largest urban park, with mangrove swamps, ponds, and lagoon on the Oleta River, the only river in Miami-Dade County never dredged or channelized; a mountain-bike trail network winds over its old dredge-spoil hills
Olustee Battlefield Historic State Park	Tall granite monument with inset plaques on a lawn	August 6, 1909	Baker; 30.2185°N 82.3825°W	617.05 acres (249.7 ha)	Preserves the site of the February 20, 1864, Battle of Olustee, Florida's largest Civil War battle, a Confederate victory that turned back a Union march toward Tallahassee; a National Historic Landmark
Orman House Historic State Park	Two-story white house with a columned double veranda, set on a grassy rise	March 29, 2001	Franklin; 29.7311°N 84.9910°W	10.27 acres (4.16 ha)	Preserves the house built in 1838 by cotton merchant Thomas Orman overlooking the Apalachicola River; Orman helped make Apalachicola one of the Gulf Coast's most important cotton-exporting ports by the mid-19th century
Oscar Scherer State Park	Blue and grey Florida scrub-jay perched on a broken branch	September 12, 1956	Sarasota; 27.1807°N 82.4602°W	1,396.32 acres (565 ha)	Protects one of the few regionally significant populations of the endangered Florida scrub jay in southwest Florida, in more than 400 acres (160 ha) of scrubby flatwoods, a habitat largely lost to development along that coast
Paynes Creek Historic State Park	Brown shingled visitor center with a wraparound porch and two palms	September 16, 1974	Hardee; 27.6198°N 81.8103°W	398.57 acres (161.3 ha)	Site of the Kennedy and Darling trading post, attacked by a group of Seminoles in July 1849 in the raid that set off the "Indian Scare of 1849"; Fort Chokonikla, the first of a line of frontier forts, was built nearby that year but never attacked
Paynes Prairie Preserve State Park	Vast golden prairie stretching flat to the horizon	September 29, 1970	Alachua; 29.5772°N 82.3076°W	21,561.71 acres (8,726 ha)	A 16,000-acre (6,500 ha) sinkhole valley holding the largest and most biologically diverse freshwater marsh in northern Florida, designated a National Natural Landmark in 1974; American bison and herds of Cracker cattle and Cracker horses roam the park
Perdido Key State Park	Small pale beach mouse peering out from among grass stems on white sand	June 2, 1978	Escambia; 30.2920°N 87.4688°W	418.9 acres (169.5 ha)	One of the only undeveloped beaches on Perdido Key, bordered on the north by the Old River, which marks the Alabama–Florida state line; vital habitat for the endangered Perdido Key beach mouse, found nowhere else
Ponce de Leon Springs State Park	Clear spring pool with a stone retaining wall and handrails, reflecting the surrounding woods	September 4, 1970	Holmes, Walton; 30.7088°N 85.9274°W	380.84 acres (154.1 ha)	Contains Ponce de Leon Spring, a second-magnitude spring whose three boils discharge about 14 million US gallons (53,000,000 litres) a day of 68 °F (20 °C) water through a 350-foot (110 m) run into Sandy Creek
Price's Scrub State Park	Open pine flatwoods with saw palmetto and shrubs under cumulus clouds	November 19, 2002	Marion; 29.4672°N 82.2841°W	1,132.94 acres (458 ha)	At least 14 natural communities, including scrub, upland mixed woodland, scrubby flatwoods, and sinkhole lakes; part of proposed links between the Cross Florida Greenway, Paynes Prairie, and other conservation lands
Pumpkin Hill Creek Preserve State Park	Park entrance sign at a sandy drive through pines	August 3, 1994	Duval; 30.4718°N 81.5124°W	4,316.75 acres (1,747 ha)	A buffer preserve of more than 4,000 acres (1,600 ha) protecting the tidal creeks and salt marshes of the greater Timucuan Ecological and Historic Preserve; part of the 7 Creeks Recreation Area with neighboring parks and preserves
Rainbow Springs State Park	Clear blue-green spring run framed by moss-draped trees	October 25, 1990	Marion; 29.0819°N 82.4268°W	1,584.43 acres (641 ha)	Contains Rainbow Springs, Florida's fourth-largest first-magnitude spring, and the first 3 miles (4.8 km) of the Rainbow River; artificial waterfalls and garden stonework survive from its years as a roadside attraction; the spring was designated a National Natural Landmark in 1971
Ravine Gardens State Park	Densely vegetated slopes of a wooded ravine	January 1, 1970	Putnam; 29.6328°N 81.6414°W	152.93 acres (61.9 ha)	Botanical garden created in 1933 with New Deal funding in steephead ravines up to 90 feet (27 m) deep near Palatka; its amphitheater and suspension bridges date from that era, and the park was NRHP-listed in 1999
River Rise Preserve State Park	Dark river with cypress knees along a forested bank	September 4, 1974	Alachua, Columbia; 29.8711°N 82.6020°W	4,004.43 acres (1,621 ha)	Marks the point where the Santa Fe River re-emerges after flowing underground for more than 3 miles (4.8 km) from the River Sink in O'Leno State Park
Rock Springs Run State Reserve	Wildlife management area sign beside a small kiosk at a trailhead	March 10, 1983	Orange, Lake, Seminole; 28.7722°N 81.4535°W	14,164.77 acres (5,732 ha)	Rock Springs Run, the reserve's most distinctive feature, flows from Rock Springs in neighboring Kelly Park to help form the upper Wekiva River; the reserve is part of a wildlife corridor reaching through Seminole State Forest to the Ocala National Forest, habitat for the Florida black bear
Ruth B. Kirby Gilchrist Blue Springs State Park	Clear spring pool with a wooden dock and a boardwalk along the far bank	October 6, 2017	Gilchrist; 29.8276°N 82.6812°W	402.42 acres (162.9 ha)	A group of springs on the Santa Fe River, including the second-magnitude Gilchrist Blue and Naked springs; operated privately for decades before the state acquired it for $5.2 million and opened it as Florida's 175th state park on November 1, 2017
San Felasco Hammock Preserve State Park	Brown trail sign standing in a grassy field at the edge of woods	June 9, 1983	Alachua; 29.7408°N 82.4500°W	7,362.56 acres (2,980 ha)	Protects perhaps the largest upland hardwood forest in Florida among more than 20 natural communities, including sinkholes, springs, and swallets; designated a National Natural Landmark in 1974
San Marcos de Apalache Historic State Park	Picnic table and green-roofed pavilion among palms beside a river	March 9, 1964	Wakulla; 30.1521°N 84.2103°W	15.35 acres (6.21 ha)	Site of a fort at the confluence of the Wakulla and St. Marks rivers, begun by Spain in 1679 and occupied for nearly two centuries by Spanish, British, U.S., and Confederate forces; NRHP-listed in 1966 and a National Historic Landmark
San Pedro Underwater Archaeological Preserve State Park	Murky underwater view of a timber and ballast stones on a shipwreck site	March 28, 1989	Monroe; 24.8634°N 80.6799°W	643.62 acres (260.5 ha)	Protects the wreck of the San Pedro, a 287-ton ship of the 21-vessel Spanish fleet of 1733 that a hurricane wrecked along the Florida Keys; it lies in 18 feet (5.5 m) of water south of Indian Key
Savannas Preserve State Park	Scattered pines above palmetto and marsh grasses under a cloudy sky	April 25, 1977	Martin, St. Lucie; 27.3162°N 80.2868°W	7,005.52 acres (2,835 ha)	Protects the last relatively undisturbed coastal freshwater basin marsh in southeastern Florida, lying below the old dunes of the Atlantic Coastal Ridge, with a corridor of scrub and other communities along the North Fork of the St. Lucie River
Seabranch Preserve State Park	Cluster of pink and yellow plumeria flowers among glossy leaves	October 22, 1991	Martin; 27.1353°N 80.1683°W	921.49 acres (372.9 ha)	Protects some of the last remaining coastal scrub in southeast Florida, a globally imperiled community, between the Intracoastal Waterway and US 1; habitat for the threatened Florida scrub jay and gopher tortoise
Sebastian Inlet State Park	Orange-headed agama lizard basking on a limestone rock	February 14, 1969	Brevard, Indian River; 27.8602°N 80.4522°W	972.4 acres (393.5 ha)	On the Sebastian Inlet, first dug by hand between 1886 and 1895 and opened permanently in 1924; the McLarty Treasure Museum, built in 1969 on the site of the survivors' and salvagers' camp of the 1715 Spanish treasure fleet, interprets the wreck
Shoal River Headwaters State Park	Red clay road running through young pine woods	October 7, 2025	Walton; 30.7729°N 86.2293°W	2,480.42 acres (1,004 ha)	Opened on January 23, 2026, on 2,480 acres (1,000 ha) west of DeFuniak Springs: rolling sandy hills, flatwoods, and floodplain forests along tributaries of the Shoal River; it buffers military lands and links wildlife corridors in the Northwest Florida Sentinel Landscape
Silver Springs State Park	Kayakers paddling a river beneath moss-draped trees	December 11, 1985	Marion; 29.2034°N 82.0217°W	4,739.92 acres (1,918 ha)	Contains Silver Springs, one of the largest limestone springs in the world and the inland first-magnitude spring with the largest flow in Florida; the glass-bottom boats introduced here in the 1870s pioneered underwater tourism, and the springs served as a filming location for early Tarzan films and the Sea Hunt television series; the springs were designated a National Natural Landmark in 1971
Skyway Fishing Pier State Park	Concrete fishing pier extending over the water, with a highway bridge beyond	December 20, 1994	Hillsborough, Manatee, Pinellas; 27.6215°N 82.6561°W	16.46 acres (6.66 ha)	Repurposes the surviving approaches of the original 1954 Sunshine Skyway Bridge (partially destroyed in a 1980 ship collision) as the world's longest fishing pier, spanning Tampa Bay
South Fork State Park	Sandy two-track crossing open scrub and grassland under towering clouds	October 26, 1988	Manatee; 27.6162°N 82.2515°W	1,129.44 acres (457 ha)	Tract on the South Fork of the Little Manatee River, part of the river's headwaters, with bottomland forest, upland mixed forest, and rosemary scrub; the imperiled broadleaf nodding cap orchid (Triphora amazonica) grows here
St. Andrews State Park	White sand beach and green water, with a rock jetty running out from shore	August 23, 1946	Bay; 30.1186°N 85.7203°W	1,167.08 acres (472 ha)	Gulf beach park on St. Andrew Bay near Panama City Beach; a replica turpentine still and a collection of turpentine-industry artifacts recall the area's naval-stores past
St. Lucie Inlet Preserve State Park	Flock of gulls rising from a beach backed by a treeline	April 9, 1965	Martin; 27.1342°N 80.1402°W	4,848.8 acres (1,962 ha)	Barrier island reached only by boat, with mangroves, a hammock of live oaks and cabbage palms, and a beach where loggerhead, leatherback, and green turtles nest; more than 3,500 acres (1,400 ha) of reef offshore within the park mark the northern end of Florida's Coral Reef
St. Sebastian River Preserve State Park	Straight canal running beside a grassy levee under a cloudy sky	April 4, 1995	Brevard, Indian River; 27.8210°N 80.5618°W	21,629.35 acres (8,753 ha)	More than 21,600 acres (8,700 ha) along the St. Sebastian River, including a rare strand swamp and mangrove forest; habitat for the red-cockaded woodpecker, crested caracara, and Florida scrub jay, and manatees are common in the river
Stephen Foster Folk Culture Center State Park	White columned museum building with flanking wings, fronted by a lawn	July 1, 1979	Hamilton; 30.3319°N 82.7788°W	903.9 acres (365.8 ha)	Memorializes songwriter Stephen Foster, composer of Florida's state song "Old Folks at Home", with a museum and carillon tower on the bank of the Suwannee River; the park inspired and hosts the Florida Folk Festival each Memorial Day weekend
Stump Pass Beach State Park	Sparse sea oats on a white dune above turquoise water	May 10, 1971	Charlotte; 26.9053°N 82.3448°W	232.13 acres (93.9 ha)	Southern end of Manasota Key, where sand carried south along the Gulf shore keeps building a spit toward Stump Pass; nesting habitat for sea turtles and shorebirds, and home to gopher tortoises
Suwannee River State Park	Park entrance drive flanked by stone piers supporting a timber arch	June 23, 1936	Hamilton, Madison, Suwannee; 30.4018°N 83.1608°W	1,932.77 acres (782 ha) (Note: The 2025 and 2026 jurisdiction reports give no area for this unit. The figure shown is from the July 2024 report.)	At the confluence of the Suwannee and Withlacoochee rivers; Confederate earthworks built to protect the railroad bridge over the Suwannee survive, along with the Columbus Cemetery, in use since at least 1862
T.H. Stone Memorial St. Joseph Peninsula State Park	Cabbage palms and coastal scrub with the bay glimpsed through the trunks	February 4, 1964	Gulf; 29.8238°N 85.4061°W	2,790.91 acres (1,129 ha)	On the St. Joseph Peninsula between St. Joseph Bay and the Gulf of Mexico, where sand is still extending the peninsula's northern tip; one of Florida's most important snowy plover nesting areas, with nesting sea turtles and St. Andrew beach mice in its dunes
Tarkiln Bayou Preserve State Park	Boardwalk reaching a bayou beside a lone leaning pine	April 13, 1998	Escambia; 30.3605°N 87.3913°W	4,549.15 acres (1,841 ha)	Nearly 4,000 acres (1,600 ha) of wet prairie, wet flatwoods, and other communities along Tarkiln Bayou, where pitcher plants, other carnivorous plants, and terrestrial orchids are abundant in places
Terra Ceia Preserve State Park	Mangrove shoreline along a broad bay, with distant shoreline structures	August 24, 1998	Manatee; 27.5978°N 82.5621°W	1,948.02 acres (788 ha)	Part of a joint effort to restore about 1,800 acres (730 ha) of coastal habitat in the park and the neighboring Terra Ceia Aquatic Preserve on Tampa Bay; also protects old-growth mangroves and the 1909 Haley House
Three Rivers State Park	Pine-lined lakeshore seen across weedy shallows	March 1, 1955	Jackson; 30.7393°N 84.9240°W	658.78 acres (266.6 ha)	About 4 miles (6.4 km) of shoreline on Lake Seminole, the reservoir behind Jim Woodruff Dam where the Chattahoochee and Flint rivers meet and the Apalachicola begins; rolling hills, ravines, and slope forests overlook the old river floodplain
Tomoka State Park	Painted concrete sculpture group of standing and kneeling figures on a fountain base beneath mossy oaks	October 30, 1945	Volusia; 29.3194°N 81.0830°W	1,628 acres (659 ha)	Peninsula between the Tomoka and Halifax rivers, site of the Timucua village of Nocoroco, which the Spaniard Álvaro Mexía visited and mapped in 1605; Fred Dana Marsh's 45-foot (14 m) sculpture Legend of Tomokie stands at Tomoka Point
Topsail Hill Preserve State Park	Wooden dune walkover leading to beachgoers with umbrellas at the surf line	May 29, 1992	Walton; 30.3676°N 86.2903°W	1,647.96 acres (667 ha)	Habitat for the federally endangered Choctawhatchee beach mouse, found across most of the park's beach dunes, and for nesting loggerhead sea turtles; contains four coastal dune lakes and 3.2 miles (5.1 km) of Gulf beach
Torreya State Park	White two-story house at the head of a lawn, approached by a brick walkway	April 22, 1935	Gadsden, Liberty; 30.5490°N 84.9215°W	14,869.17 acres (6,017 ha)	Named for the Florida torreya, an endangered conifer found only along a 20-mile (32 km) stretch of the Apalachicola River and in steep decline since the 1950s; the Civilian Conservation Corps moved the antebellum Gregory House to the park's bluffs, which also hold Confederate gun pits; designated a National Natural Landmark in 1976
Troy Spring State Park	Wooden stairs and railing descending to a clear green spring basin	June 12, 1995	Lafayette; 30.0029°N 82.9971°W	83.57 acres (33.82 ha)	Contains Troy Spring, a 70-foot (21 m)-deep first-magnitude spring whose 325-foot (99 m) run flows into the Suwannee River, and the remains of the Confederate steamboat Madison, scuttled by its owner when he left to fight in Virginia
Waccasassa Bay Preserve State Park	Orange sunset over a coastal marsh with still water	December 10, 1971	Levy; 29.1489°N 82.8315°W	34,387.61 acres (13,916 ha)	Reached only by boat, it protects about 19,000 acres (7,700 ha) of tidal marsh, rivers, and tree islands along 20 miles (32 km) of coast, with remnants of the Gulf Hammock, once Florida's largest hydric hammock; designated a National Natural Landmark in 1976
Washington Oaks Gardens State Park	Layered coquina rock outcrops on a beach beside breaking surf	June 10, 1964	Flagler; 29.6342°N 81.2057°W	419.55 acres (169.8 ha)	A coquina-rock shoreline, an outcrop found in only a few places on Florida's Atlantic coast, and ornamental gardens planted by Owen D. Young and his wife, Louise, after they bought the property in 1936; the site was earlier General Joseph Hernández's Bella Vista Plantation
Weeki Wachee Springs State Park	Green canoe drawn up on a clear spring-fed river under overhanging trees	November 15, 2008	Hernando; 28.5200°N 82.5843°W	927.81 acres (375.5 ha)	Home of the Weeki Wachee mermaid show, a live underwater theater performance running continuously since 1947
Wekiwa Springs State Park	Swimmers and sunbathers crowding a spring run and its grassy bank	April 30, 1969	Orange, Lake, Seminole; 28.7479°N 81.4798°W	9,175.47 acres (3,713 ha)	Contains Wekiwa Springs, headwaters of the 15.2-mile (24.5 km) Wekiva River, one of only two Florida rivers designated a national Wild and Scenic River; about 20 miles (32 km) north of Orlando
Werner-Boyce Salt Springs State Park	Covered picnic pavilion with tables on a concrete pad in pine woods	July 1, 2000	Pasco; 28.3152°N 82.7205°W	3,377.9 acres (1,367 ha)	Protects two artesian salt springs, Cauldron Spring and Salt Spring, more than 320 feet (98 m) deep, and about 4 miles (6.4 km) of undisturbed low-energy Gulf coastline in western Pasco County
Wes Skiles Peacock Springs State Park	Clear turquoise spring pool ringed by forest	June 11, 1986	Suwannee; 30.1316°N 83.1364°W	761 acres (308.0 ha)	Protects several underwater cave systems, including the 8.5-mile (13.7 km) Peacock Springs system, one of the longest in Florida and a major cave-diving site; named for underwater filmmaker Wes Skiles
Windley Key Fossil Reef Geological State Park	Fan-shaped fossil coral exposed in a cut limestone face	January 17, 1986	Monroe; 24.9571°N 80.5951°W	320.38 acres (129.7 ha)	Former quarry that supplied fill for Henry Flagler's Overseas Railroad; its walls, cut into the fossil coral of the Key Largo Limestone, are one of only two places in the continental United States with such a cross section of ancient reef
Wingate Creek State Park	Small tannin-stained creek running through shady woods	October 26, 1988	Manatee; 27.4465°N 82.1431°W	614.22 acres (248.6 ha)	Land on Wingate Creek in the headwaters of the Myakka River, acquired in 1988 together with South Fork as mitigation by the Beker Phosphate Company
Ybor City Museum State Park	White wooden cottages with porches behind a picket fence	August 17, 1983	Hillsborough; 27.9619°N 82.4387°W	0.96 acres (0.39 ha)	Interprets the founding of Ybor City by Vicente Martinez-Ybor as a center of the international cigar trade; the museum is in the historic Ferlita Bakery, beside six relocated cigar workers' houses
Yellow Bluff Fort Historic State Park	Stone monument with an inscribed plaque standing above a low brick wall	September 12, 1950	Duval; 30.3996°N 81.5562°W	1.74 acres (0.70 ha)	Earthworks built by Confederate forces in 1862 to keep Union gunboats out of the St. Johns River; in 1864 Union troops, including companies of the 8th and 34th U.S. Colored Troops and the 54th Massachusetts, were stationed there
Yellow River Marsh Preserve State Park	Pitcher plants standing in a wet savanna beside open water	June 12, 2000	Santa Rosa; 30.5010°N 87.0661°W	1,041 acres (421 ha)	Protects one of Florida's last remaining tracts of wet prairie, including the state's largest community of pitcher plants, and more than 200 species of vascular plants
Yulee Sugar Mill Ruins Historic State Park	Rusted iron gears and flywheel of a sugar mill in front of a stone chimney	October 3, 1955	Citrus; 28.7837°N 82.6076°W	4.6 acres (1.86 ha)	Ruins of the sugar mill of David Levy Yulee's Margarita Plantation (about 1851–1864), built and run by enslaved laborers; its boiler, evaporating pans, and machinery survive; NRHP-listed in 1970

== State trails ==
Of the 176 units, 11 are classified as linear corridors: 10 state trails and the Marjorie Harris Carr Cross Florida Greenway. They are listed separately so that each trail's length can be given alongside its area.

Florida state trails and greenways, as of July 1, 2026
Trail name	Image	Acquired	County and location	Area	Length	Notable feature
Blackwater Heritage State Trail	Paved rail trail running straight between dense roadside trees	November 4, 1993	Santa Rosa; 30.6903°N 87.0258°W	308.45 acres (124.8 ha)	8.1 miles (13.0 km)	Paved rail-trail in Milton, the westernmost in Florida, on the old Florida and Alabama Railroad line later rebuilt to carry fuel to NAS Whiting Field, with a parallel equestrian trail; a designated National Recreation Trail
Florida Keys Overseas Heritage Trail	Two cyclists silhouetted beneath a leaning palm at sunrise over the water	May 18, 1994	Monroe; 24.8711°N 81.0697°W	328.92 acres (133.1 ha)	106 miles (170.6 km)	Trail along the Overseas Highway that reuses historic bridges of Henry Flagler's Overseas Railroad, completed in 1912, including the Old Bahia Honda Bridge
Gainesville-to-Hawthorne State Trail	Paved trail through trees, with a wooden kiosk and interpretive marker at its edge	December 21, 1988	Alachua; 29.5954°N 82.1751°W	140.20 acres (56.7 ha)	16 miles (25.7 km)	Rail-trail along the north rim of Paynes Prairie Preserve State Park between Gainesville and Hawthorne, following a decommissioned railroad corridor for most of its length; a designated National Recreation Trail
General James A. Van Fleet State Trail	Green-roofed picnic shelter beside a paved rail trail	December 12, 1990	Lake, Polk, Sumter; 28.3954°N 81.8981°W	421.70 acres (170.7 ha)	29.2 miles (47.0 km)	Virtually straight rail-trail across the Green Swamp, through forested floodplains, marshes, meadows, and pine flatwoods; named for General James A. Van Fleet
Marjorie Harris Carr Cross Florida Greenway State Recreation and Conservation Area	Aerial view of a steel truss bridge crossing a wide waterway through forest	July 26, 1993	Citrus, Levy, Marion, Putnam; 29.1974°N 82.1810°W	74,136.59 acres (30,002 ha)	110 miles (177.0 km)	A 110-mile (180 km) linear park from Yankeetown to the St. Johns River along the corridor of the abandoned Cross Florida Barge Canal, halted in 1971 after an environmental campaign led by Marjorie Harris Carr, for whom the greenway was renamed
Nature Coast State Trail	Converted steel railroad truss bridge carrying a wooden trail deck	December 18, 1996	Dixie, Gilchrist, Levy; 29.6023°N 82.9132°W	656.27 acres (265.6 ha)	32 miles (51.5 km)	Paved rail-trail on the old Atlantic Coast Line Railroad route, linking historic depots at Trenton, Chiefland, and Cross City and crossing the Suwannee River on the historic railroad trestle
Palatka-to-Lake Butler State Trail	View through a car windshield of a highway with a trailhead across the median	February 26, 2001	Bradford, Clay, Putnam, Union; 29.8056°N 82.0046°W	613.94 acres (248.5 ha)	47 miles (75.6 km)	Rail-trail being developed on the abandoned Georgia Southern and Florida Railroad line between Palatka and Lake Butler, part of a planned long-distance connection with the Palatka-to-St. Augustine State Trail
Palatka-to-St. Augustine State Trail	Brown trail sign and yellow bicycle crossing signs at a rural highway crossing	April 10, 2007	Putnam, St. Johns; 29.7370°N 81.4938°W	69.88 acres (28.3 ha)	19 miles (30.6 km)	Paved trail 12 feet (3.7 m) wide running 19 miles (31 km) through farmland in St. Johns and Putnam counties; part of the 260-mile (420 km) St. Johns River-to-Sea Loop
Suwannee River Wilderness State Trail	Wide dark river running between low wooded banks	June 17, 2005	Dixie, Hamilton, Lafayette, Suwannee; 30.2328°N 83.0553°W	74.03 acres (30.0 ha)	170 miles (273.6 km)	Paddling trail on the Suwannee River ending at the Gulf of Mexico, with river camps, state park cabins and campgrounds at roughly 10–15 miles (16–24 km) intervals for overnight trips
Tallahassee–St. Marks Historic Railroad State Trail	Brown wooden trail sign with yellow lettering beside a shaded road	August 18, 1992	Leon, Wakulla; 30.2576°N 84.2371°W	150.80 acres (61.0 ha)	16 miles (25.7 km)	Paved rail-trail on the route of Florida's first chartered railroad, opened in 1837 between the territorial capital and the Gulf port of St. Marks to carry cotton and later naval stores and timber; it ran until 1984, longer than any other Florida railroad
Withlacoochee State Trail	Paved trail with a green junction sign and a distant cyclist	December 21, 1989	Citrus, Hernando, Pasco; 28.7192°N 82.2967°W	761.58 acres (308.2 ha)	47 miles (75.6 km)	Rail-trail running 47 miles (76 km) from Dunnellon to the old Owensboro junction in Pasco County, on two abandoned CSX rail corridors bought in 1989 as one of the first acquisitions of Florida's Rails-to-Trails program

== Units by classification ==
Each unit carries an official classification based on "the purpose for which the property was acquired or the function it is supposed to serve". This distinction is not always reflected in a unit's name; Alafia River State Park, for example, is classified as a state recreation area.

Florida state park units by classification, as of July 1, 2026
Classification	Units	Percent
State Park	57	32.4%
State Recreation Area	34	19.3%
State Preserve	28	15.9%
Historic Site	20	11.4%
State Trail	10	5.7%
State Museum	5	2.8%
Archaeological Site	5	2.8%
Ornamental Garden	4	2.3%
State Reserve	2	1.1%
Botanical Site	2	1.1%
Geological Site	2	1.1%
Fishing Pier	2	1.1%
Cultural Site	1	0.6%
State Greenway	1	0.6%
Folk Culture Center	1	0.6%
Wildlife Park	1	0.6%
Undetermined	1	0.6%
Total	176	100%
