= Cockroach Bay Preserve State Park =

State park in Florida, United States

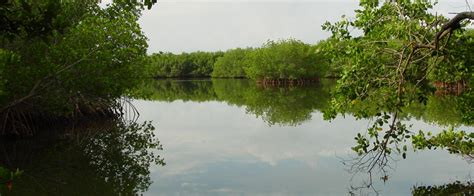
- A view into Cockroach Bay Preserve

- Location within Florida Location within the United States
- Interactive map of Cockroach Bay Preserve State Park
- Location: Hillsborough County, Florida, United States
- Nearest city: Ruskin
- Coordinates: 27°40′19″N 82°31′25″W
- Area: 249 ha (615 acres)
- Established: July 1, 2004; 22 years ago
- Governing body: Florida Department of Environmental Protection

Cockroach Bay Preserve State Park is a Florida state park in Hillsborough County, comprising a series of barrier and river islands at the mouth of the Little Manatee River on the southeastern shore of Tampa Bay, near Ruskin. The 615 acres (249 ha) preserve is accessible by water and is surrounded by the Cockroach Bay Aquatic Preserve.

Florida acquired the land for the park in 1997 under the Conservation and Recreation Lands (CARL) program using Preservation 2000 funds. It was initially managed by the Florida Coastal Office before management was transferred to the Florida Department of Environmental Protection's Division of Recreation and Parks in 2003. On July 1, 2004, the land was officially established as a state park. Within the Florida State Park system, this park is classified as a state preserve, a designation that prioritizes protection of natural conditions over recreational development.

The islands are mostly tidally submerged mangrove swamps, of which approximately 500 acres (200 ha) are mangrove habitat. The preserve provides a habitat for three imperiled plant species, ten bird species, two reptiles, and the Florida manatee. The park also serves to protect the Little Cockroach Key archaeological site (8HI38) and the Cockroach Key Shell Midden (8HI12209). Two paddling trails provide canoe and kayak access through the surrounding aquatic preserve, and the park is popular for birding and fishing. The Horseshoe Crab and Snook Canoe trails pass through seagrass beds, oyster reefs, and mangroves.
