= Fernandina Plaza Historic State Park =

State park in Florida, United States

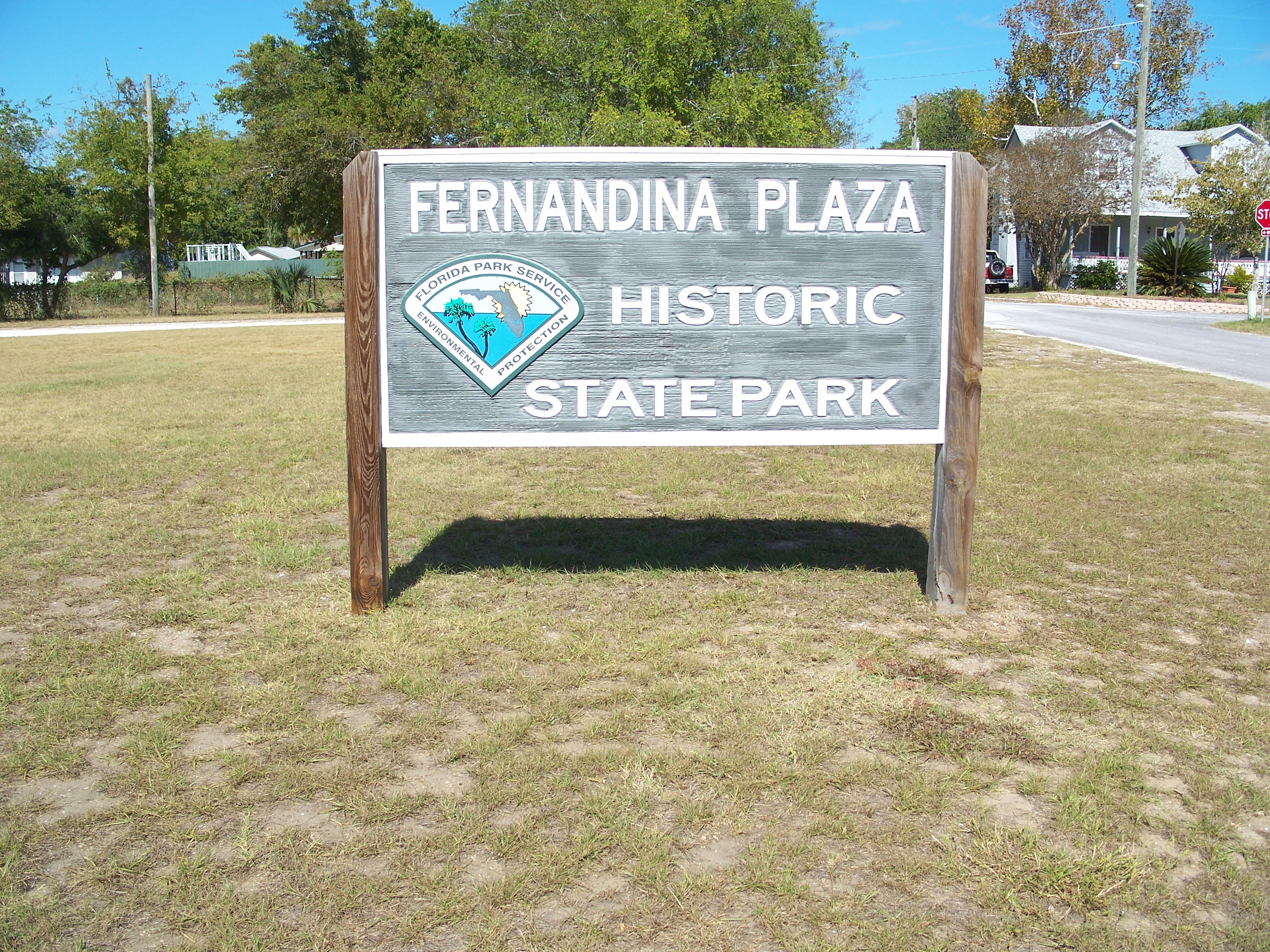
- Park entrance sign

- Location within Florida Location within the United States
- Interactive map of Fernandina Plaza Historic State Park
- Location: Nassau County, Florida, United States
- Nearest city: Fernandina Beach
- Coordinates: 30°41′19″N 81°27′24″W
- Area: 0.80 acres (0.32 ha)
- Established: December 30, 1941; 85 years ago
- Governing body: Florida Department of Environmental Protection
- Fernandina Plaza Historic State Park
- U.S. Historic district – Contributing property
- Part of: Original Town of Fernandina Historic Site (ID86003685)
- Added to NRHP: 29 January 1990

Fernandina Plaza Historic State Park is a Florida state park in Nassau County, located in Old Town Fernandina on Amelia Island. At 0.80 acres (0.32 ha), it is the smallest unit in the Florida state park system and is operated as a satellite of Fort Clinch State Park.

The State of Florida initially acquired the park's property on December 30, 1941 from the United States Federal Government. On January 23, 1968, the board of the Internal Improvement Trust Fund leased the land to the Department of Environmental Protection (DEP) Division of Recreation and Parks The park protects central plaza of Fort San Carlos, a historic fort built in the late Second Spanish Period settlement of Fernandina, an era characterized by state planning documents as the last planned Spanish town in North America.

The plaza is a contributing property to the Original Town of Fernandina Historic Site, which was listed on the National Register of Historic Places in 1990. The only prominent feature in the modern park is a Florida Historical Marker. Differing from many other parks in the State Park system, this state park contains no distinct natural communities, hydrological features, special natural features, or endangered species.
