= Indian River Lagoon Preserve State Park =

State park in Florida, United States

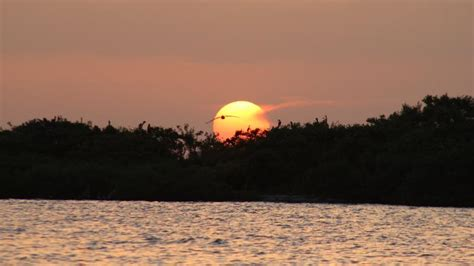
- Sunset at the park

- Location within Florida Location within the United States
- Interactive map of Indian River Lagoon Preserve State Park
- Location: Flagler and Volusia counties, Florida, United States
- Nearest city: Bushnell
- Coordinates: 27°56′30″N 80°30′14″W
- Area: 220.18 ha (544.08 acres)
- Established: December 22, 2003; 23 years ago
- Governing body: Florida Department of Environmental Protection

Indian River Lagoon Preserve State Park is a Florida state park in Brevard County, on a barrier island along the Indian River Lagoon roughly 12 miles south-southeast of Melbourne. The 544 acres (220 ha) park can be accessed from Florida State Road A1A by way of the Old Florida Trail.

The modern park was put together from three separate parcels acquired between 2000 and 2005. The Board of Trustees of the Internal Improvement Fund acquired the 187-acre Mullet Creek Parcel on September 29, 2000, through the Indian River Lagoon Blueways Conservation and Recreation Lands project. Next was the 256-acre Inlet Grove Property which was bought together with help from the St. Johns River Water Management District on June 1, 2001. The final property was the 100-acre Church Property that was leased from the district in 2005. The combined property was originally managed as the Indian River Lagoon State Buffer Preserve by the Office of Coastal and Aquatic Managed Areas but it was renamed after management was transferred to the Division of Recreation and Parks on December 22, 2003.

Prior to state ownership, the site was used to farm pineapples in the 1880s and eventually citrus.The land also contained one of the last barrier-island Indian River citrus groves at the time of state acquisition. Classified as a State Preserve, the park protects a habitat for migratory songbirds, wading birds, shorebirds, sea turtles, and the Florida manatee, it is also one of the largest undeveloped conservation tracts along the Indian River Lagoon between Vero Beach and Melbourne. Visitors to the park can participate in activities such as hiking, wildlife viewing, and fishing.
