= Tarkiln Bayou Preserve State Park =

State park in Florida, United States

Tarkiln Bayou State Park
- IUCN category IV (habitat/species management area)
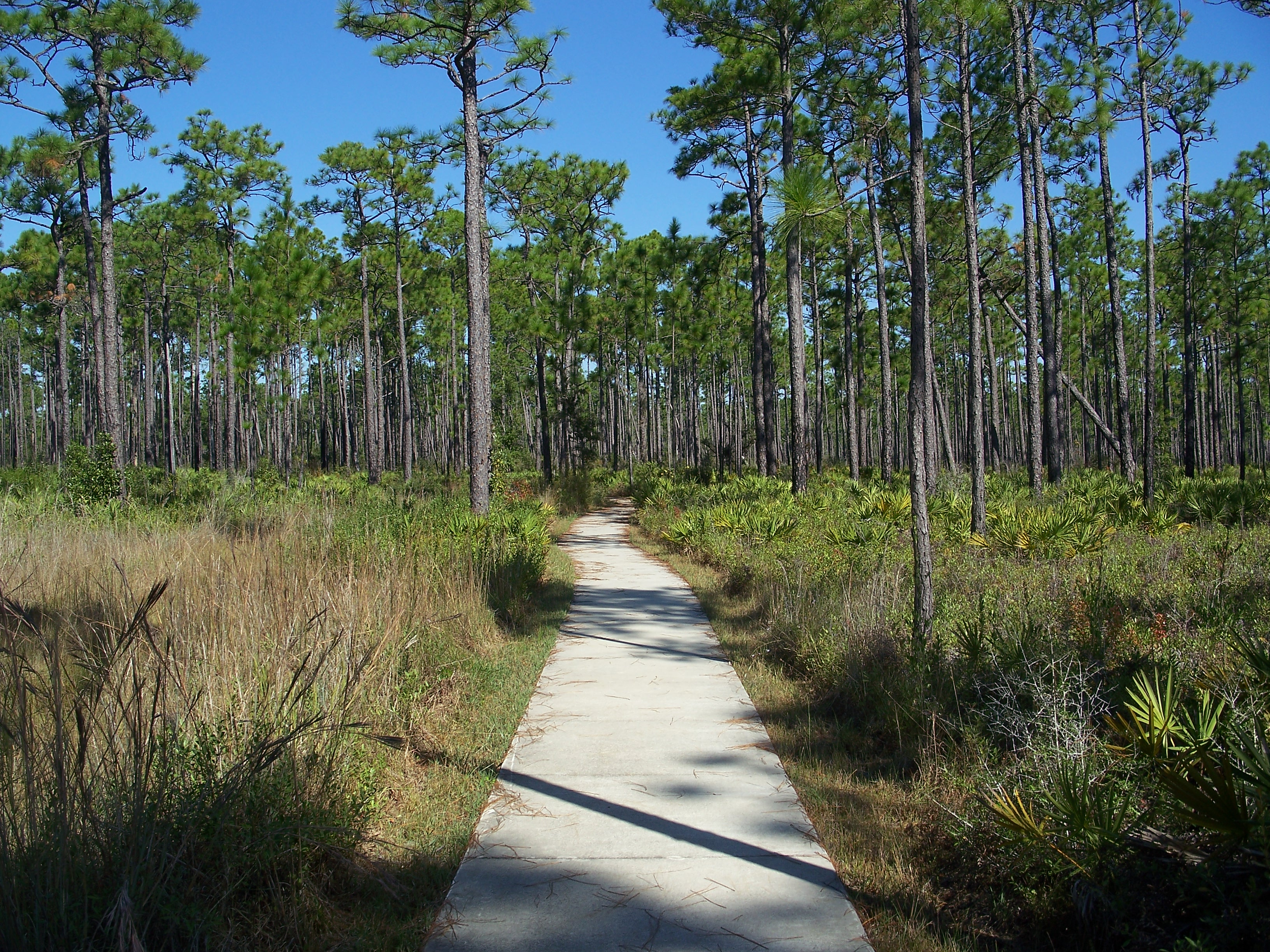
- Trail through woods

- Location within Florida Location within the United States
- Interactive map of Tarkiln Bayou State Park
- Location: Escambia County, Florida, United States
- Nearest city: Pensacola, Florida
- Coordinates: 30°22′16″N 87°24′36″W
- Area: 4,549.15 acres (1,840.98 ha)
- Governing body: Florida Department of Environmental Protection

Tarkiln Bayou Preserve State Park is a 4,549.15-acre (18.4098 km^{2}) preserve, a unit of Florida State Park located 10 miles (16 km) southwest of Pensacola, in northwestern Florida. It is home to four species of endangered pitcher plants, as well as other rare and endangered plant species. The rare, carnivorous white–top pitcher plant is unique to the Gulf Coast and found only between the Apalachicola and Mississippi rivers. Almost 100 other rare plants and animals depend on the wet prairie habitat, including the alligator snapping turtle, sweet pitcher plant, and Chapman's butterwort. Tarkiln Bayou Preserve State Park is located in Escambia County about 1.5 miles (2.4 km) south of the intersection of U.S. Hwy. 98 and State Road 293.

== Conservation ==
Management of the park’s pitcher plant habitat has included prescribed burns and the removal of encroaching woody plants, including black titi.

== Recreational Activities ==
A half-mile long ADA boardwalk to Tarkiln Bayou allows visitors to experience some of western Florida's most wild and beautiful natural areas. Visitors can picnic or hike on one of the nature trails to observe the rare plants and animals. For the more adventurous, visitors can take a day–hike across the park to the Perdido River which separates Florida from Alabama.

== Gallery ==
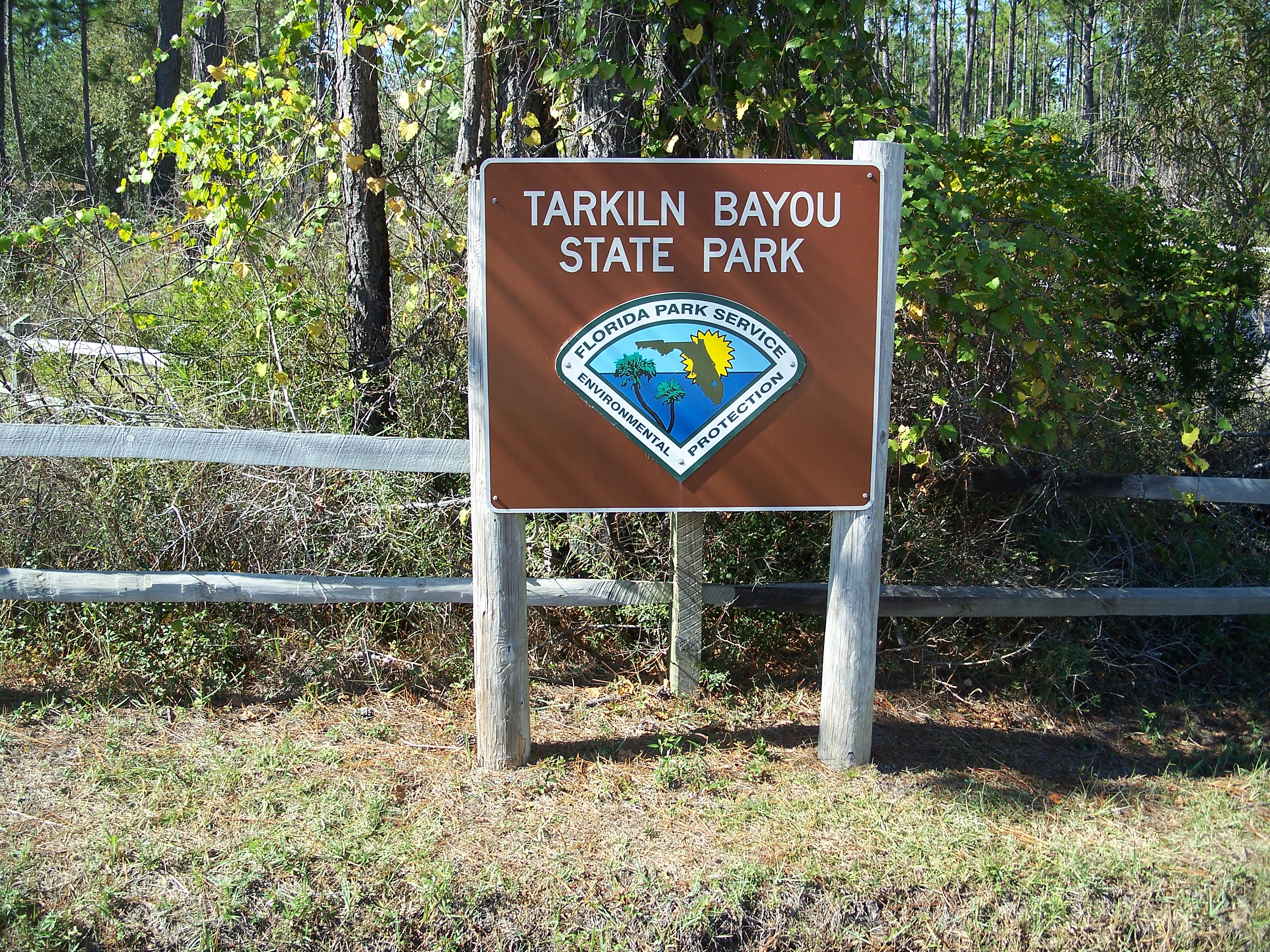
Park sign

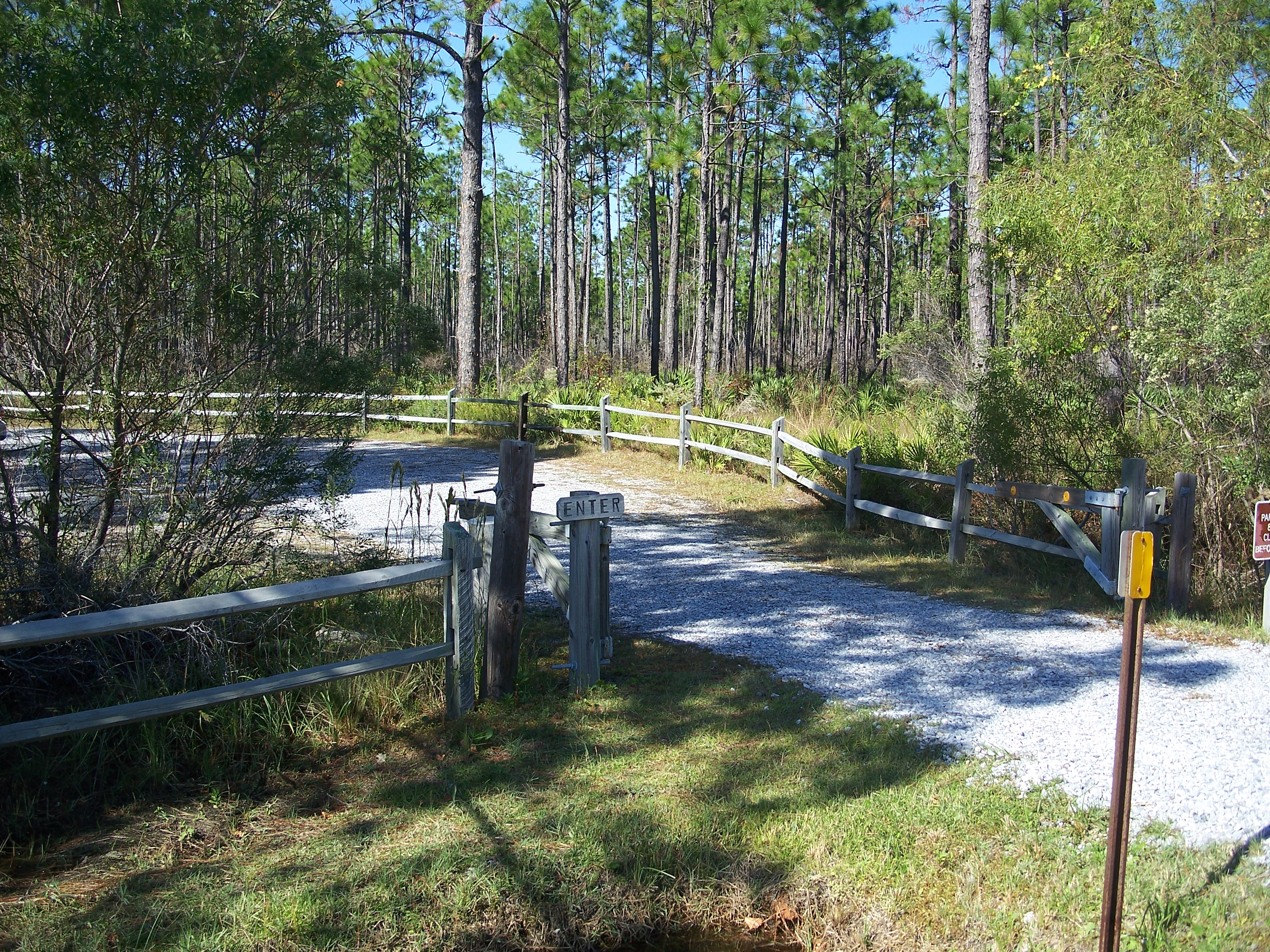
Entrance

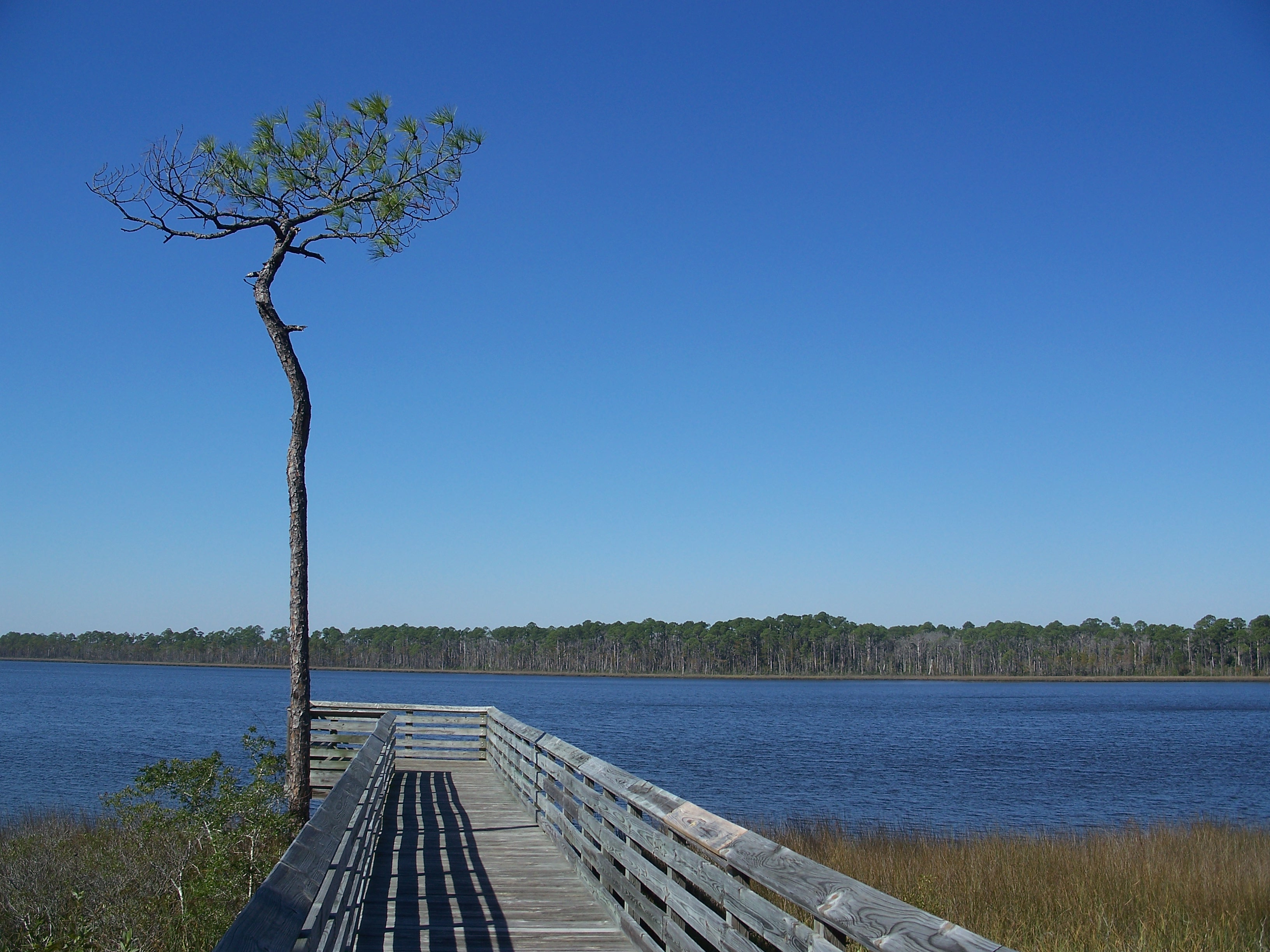
Boardwalk leading to the Bayou

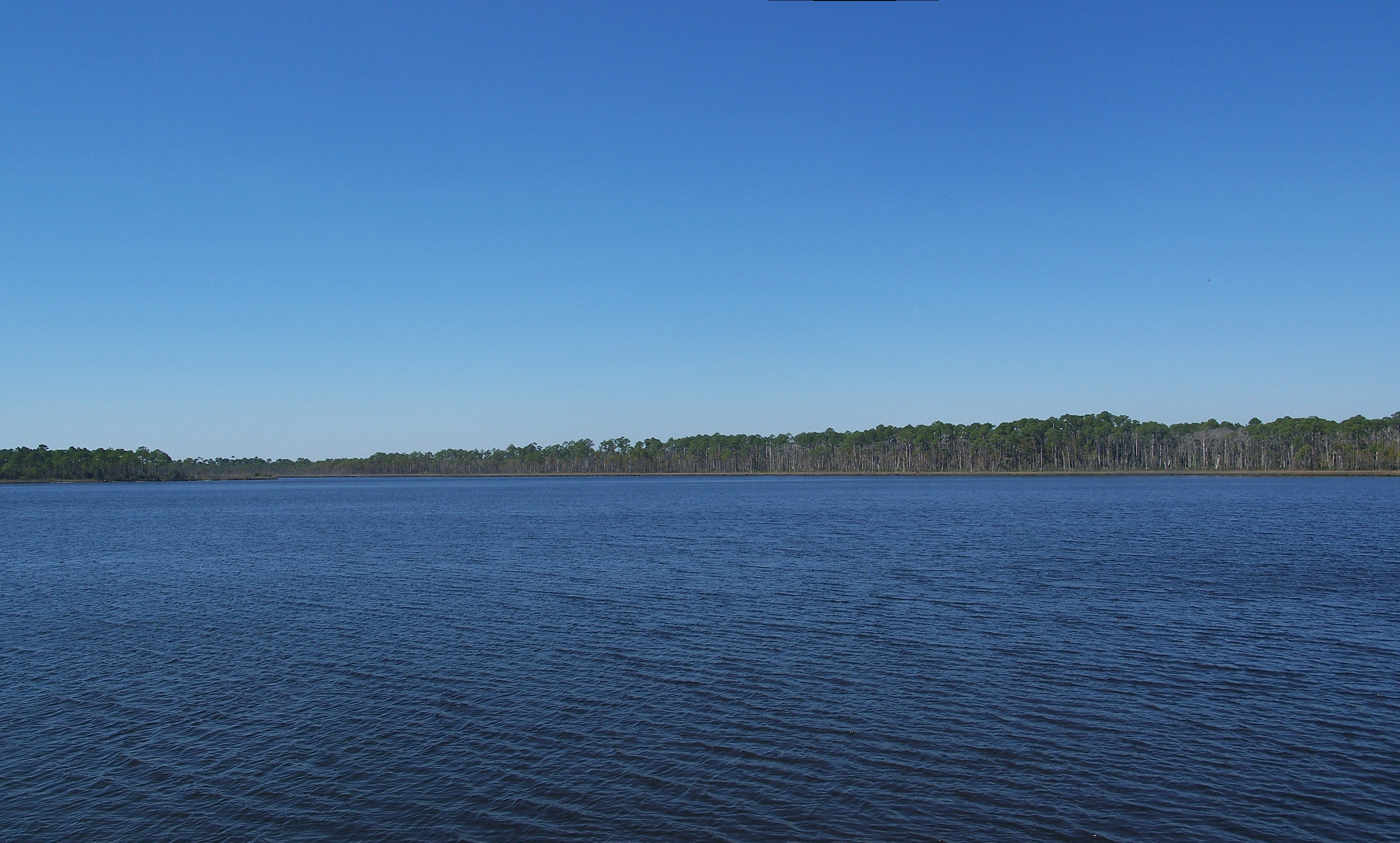
Panorama of part of the Bayou

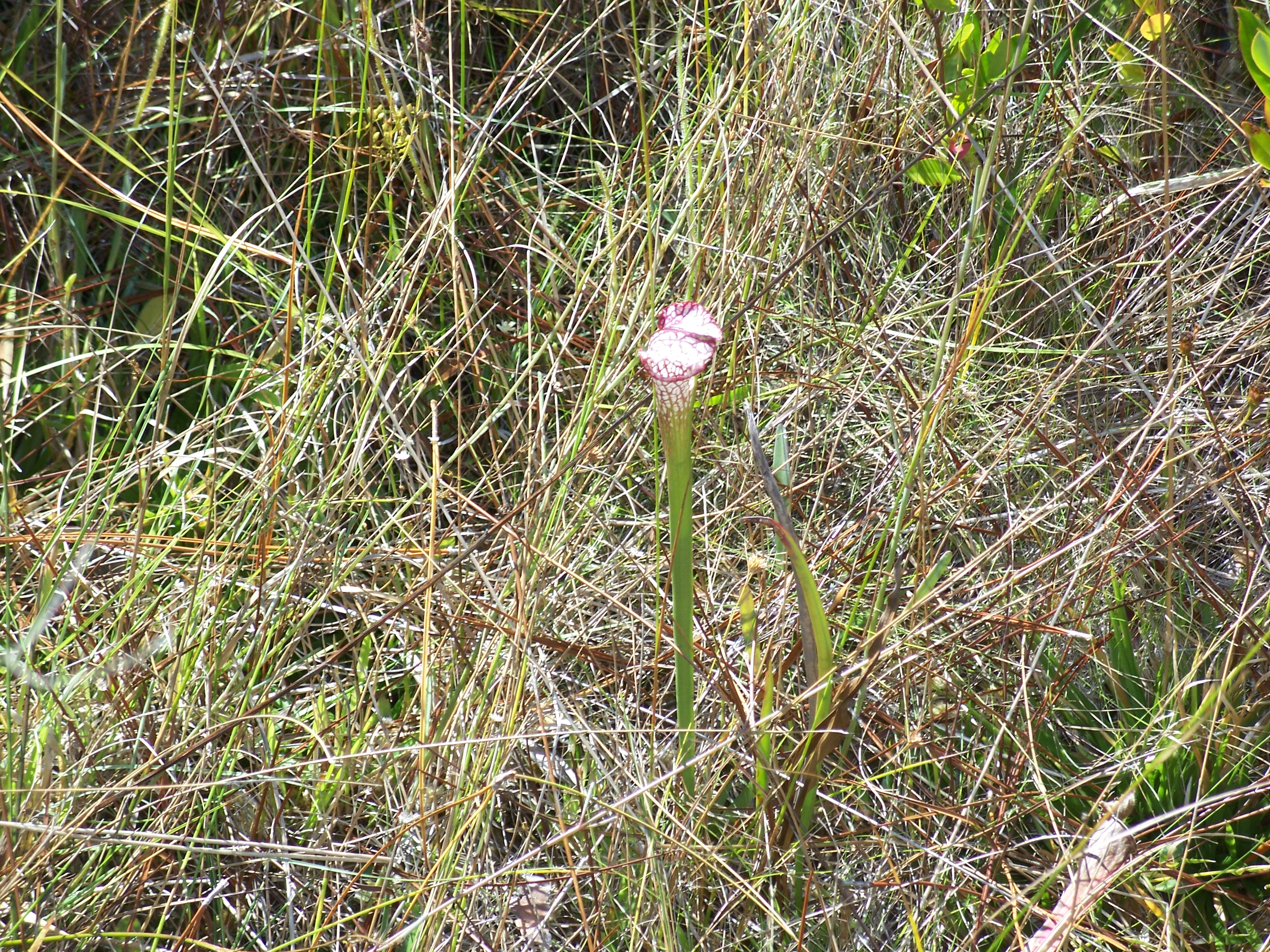
Pitcher plant
