= Haw Creek Preserve State Park =

State park in Florida, United States

- Paddling down Haw Creek

- Location within Florida Location within the United States
- Interactive map of Haw Creek Preserve State Park
- Location: Flagler and Volusia counties, Florida, United States
- Nearest city: Bushnell
- Coordinates: 29°23′12″N 81°25′22″W
- Area: 1,239 ha (3,061 acres)
- Established: August 15, 1977; 49 years ago
- Governing body: Florida Department of Environmental Protection

Haw Creek Preserve State Park is a Florida state park in Flagler and Volusia counties, surrounding Haw Creek near its outlet at Crescent Lake in the St. Johns River basin. The 3,061 acres (1,239 ha) park is accessed from Flagler County Road 2007 at Russell Landing, southeast of Bunnell.

The property was donated to the state on December 2, 1976, from The Nature Conservancy and has been leased to the state's Division of Recreation and Parks under a 99-year lease since 1977. It is classified as a state preserve, a designation that emphasizes the protection of natural conditions over recreational development.

The majority of the land, 3,000 acres (1,200 ha), at the park is floodplain swamp and basin marsh each of which contribute to water quality in the Crescent Lake–Haw Creek watershed of the Lower St. Johns River Basin. Haw Creek itself is a blackwater stream that provides a habitat for imperiled wading birds such as the little blue heron, snowy egret, reddish egret, tricolored heron, white ibis, and limpkin. The creek's dark water is colored by tannins released as fallen leaves, pine needles, and other plant matter decay. Visitors of the park can participate in recreational activities include paddling, boating, fishing, and wildlife viewing.
