= Orman House Historic State Park =

Florida state park

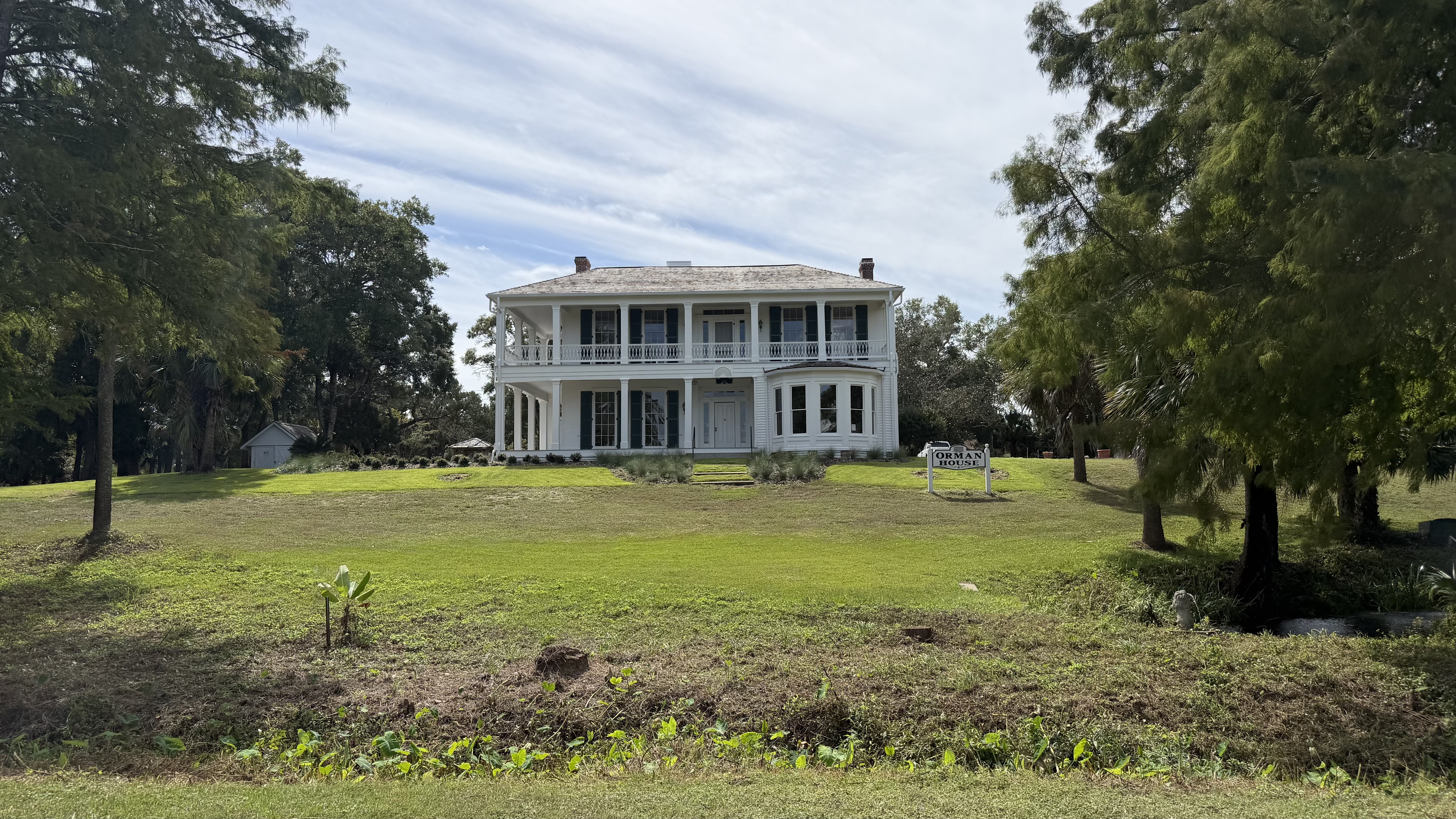
- A front view of the Orman House

- Location within Florida Location within the United States
- Interactive map of Orman House Historic State Park
- Location: Franklin County, Florida, USA
- Nearest city: Apalachicola
- Coordinates: 29°43′53″N 84°59′28″W
- Governing body: Florida Department of Environmental Protection

The Orman House (built in 1838) is a Florida State Park and historic site located in Apalachicola, in northwestern Florida. The Orman house's address is 177 5th Street.

The house combines Federal and Greek Revival architectural details. Its doors, windows, trim, and finished woodwork were made in Syracuse, New York, shipped by sea to Apalachicola, and assembled on site in 1838.

== Recreational activities ==
The adjacent Veterans Memorial Plaza includes a bronze partial replica of the Three Soldiers statue, part of the Vietnam Veterans Memorial in Washington, D.C.

== Admission and hours ==
The house is open from 9:00 a.m. until 5:00 p.m. on Monday, Thursday, Friday, Saturday, and Sunday. It is closed on Tuesdays, Wednesdays, Thanksgiving, Christmas, and New Years Day.

Admission to the tour is $2.00 per person (children under six free).

== Gallery ==
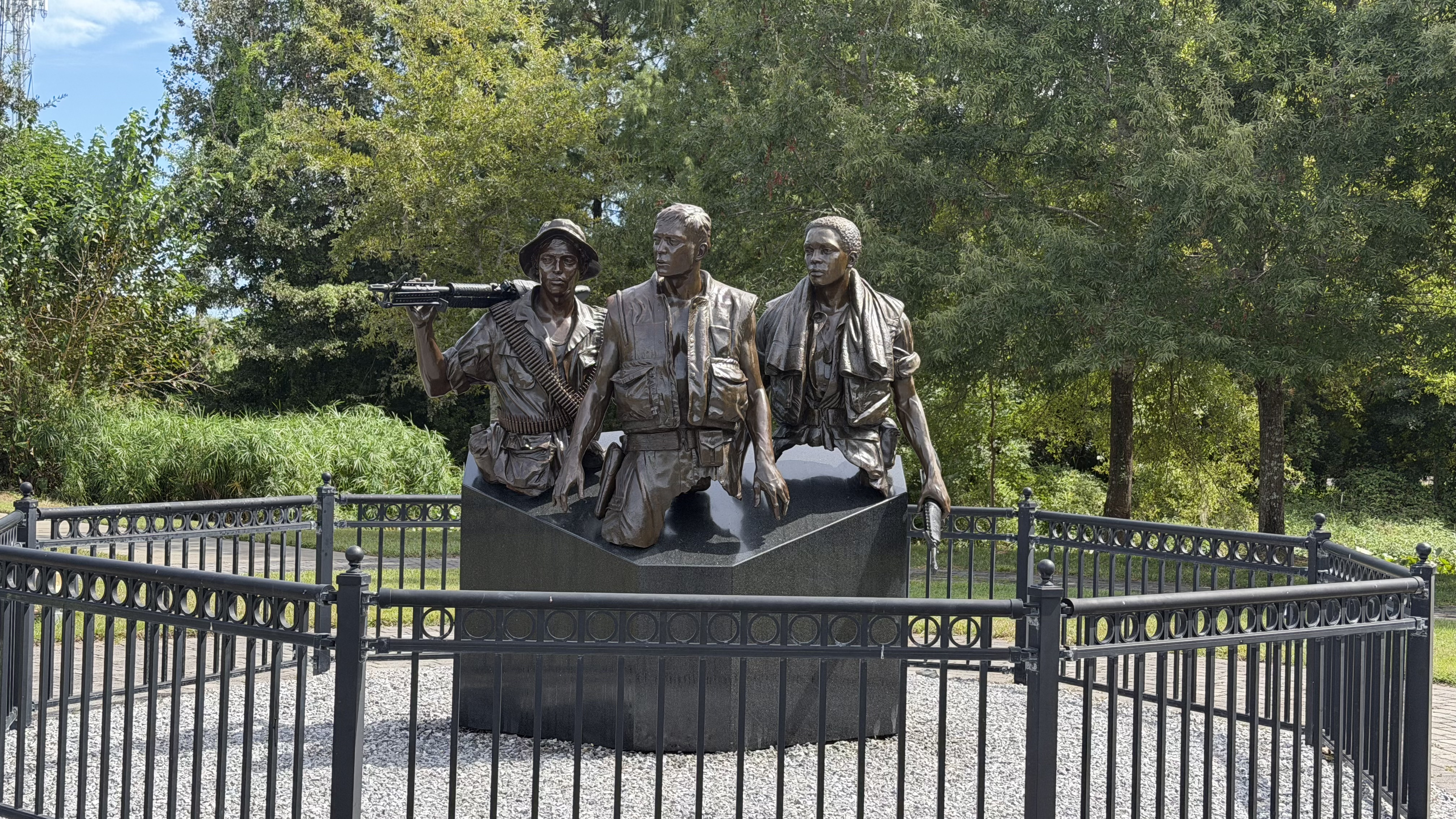
Three Soldiers Memorial

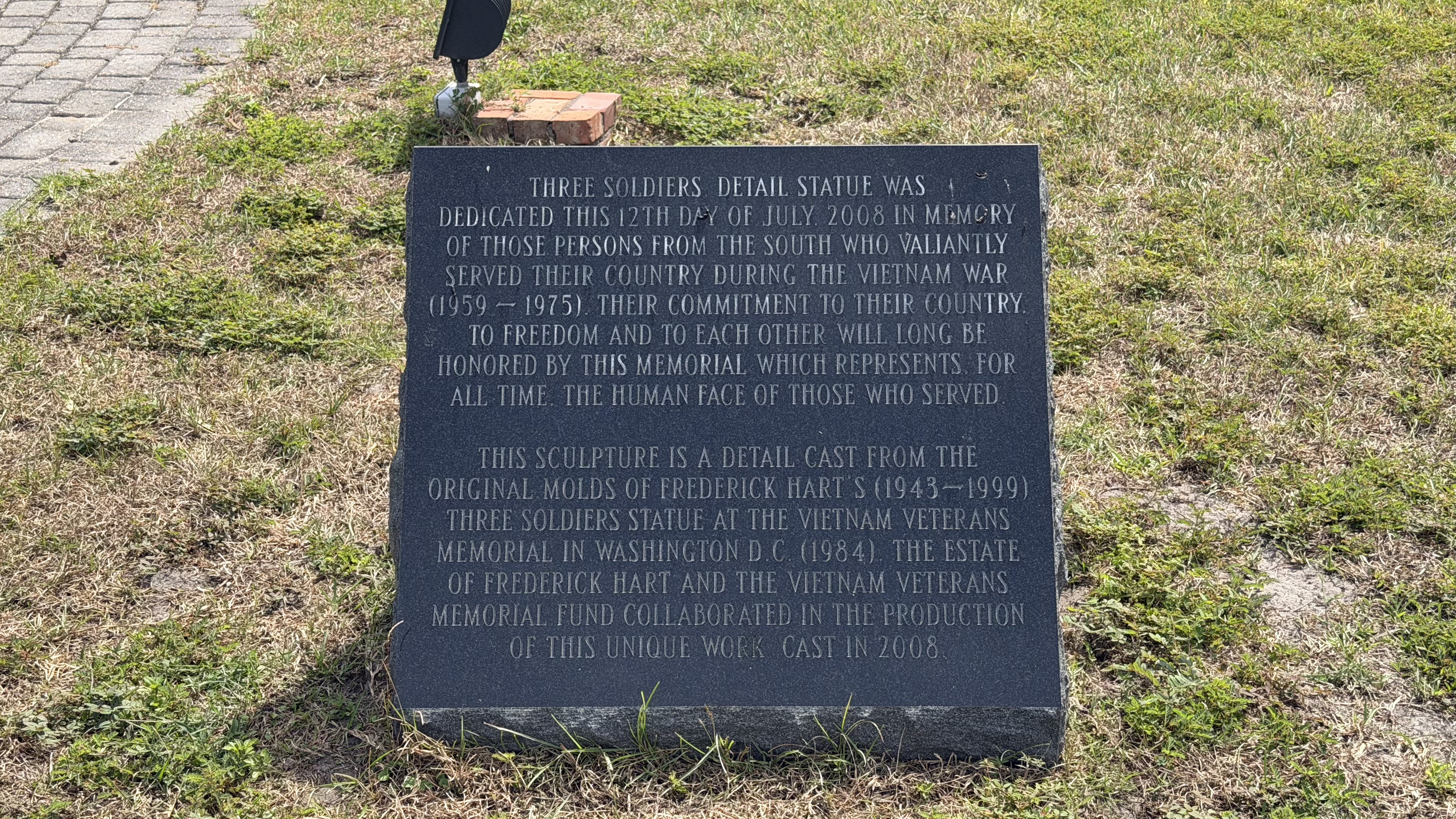
Three Soldiers Memorial Plaque

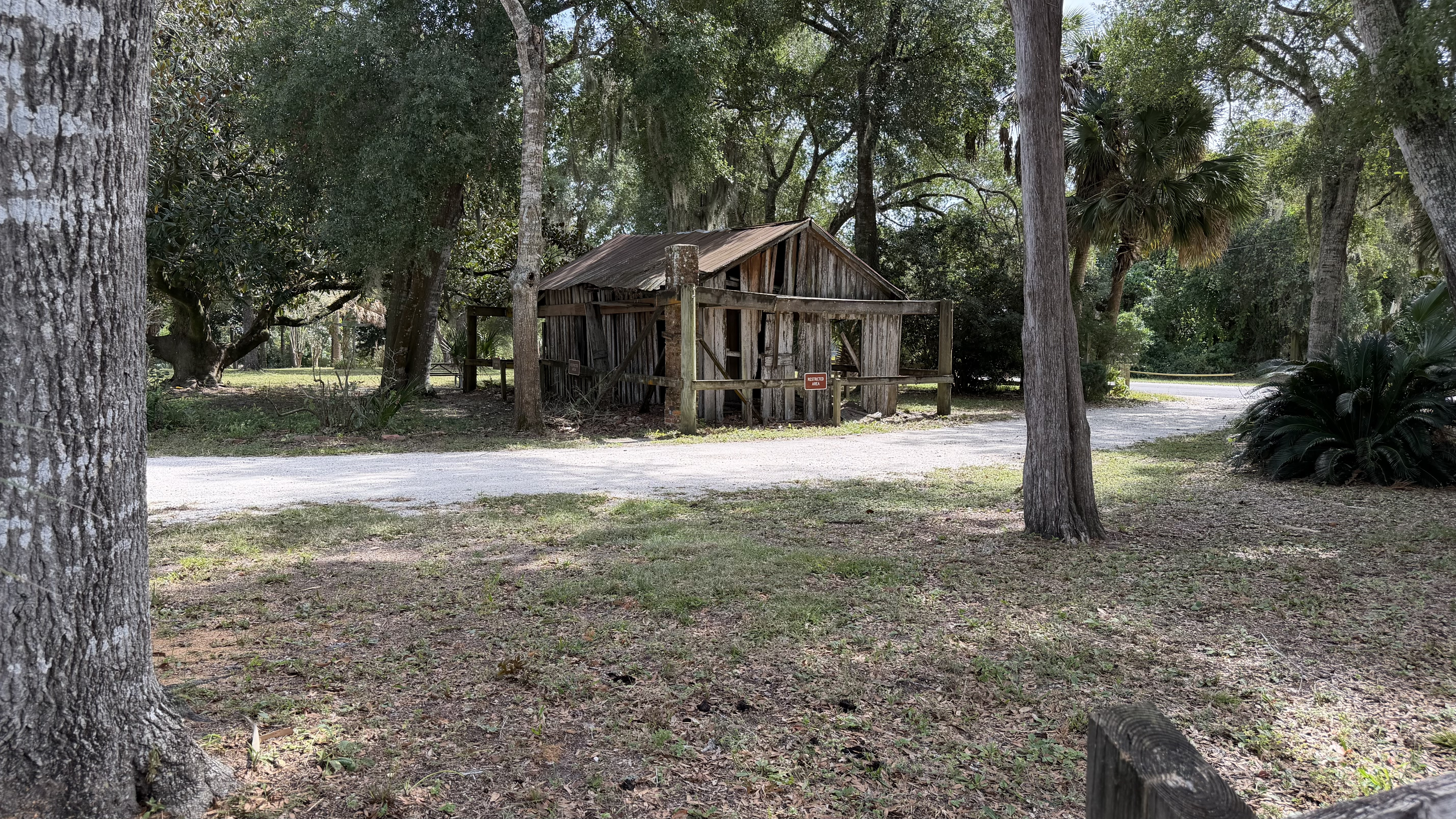
An old shed outside of the Orman House
