= Werner-Boyce Salt Springs State Park =

State park in Florida, United States

- IUCN category IV (habitat/species management area)
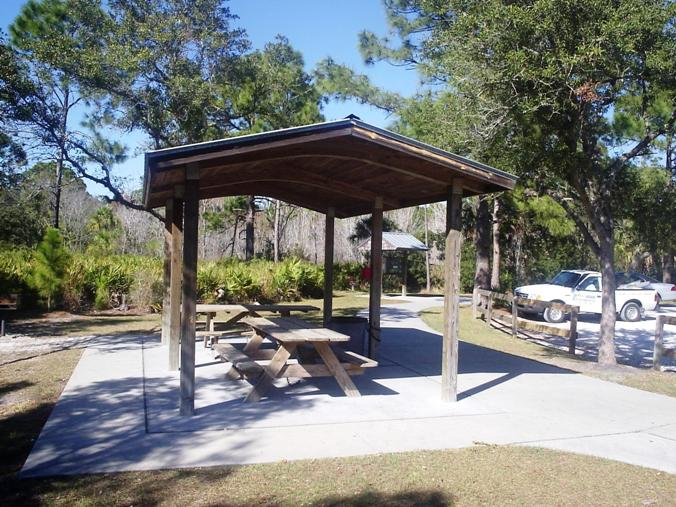
- Picnic pavilion at the Scenic Drive trailhead. More amenities are planned.

- Location within Florida Location within the United States
- Interactive map of Werner-Boyce Salt Springs State Park
- Location: Pasco County, Florida, United States
- Nearest city: Port Richey, Florida
- Coordinates: 28°19′01″N 82°42′54″W
- Governing body: Florida Department of Environmental Protection

Werner-Boyce Salt Springs State Park is a Florida state park located in Pasco County, Florida near Port Richey, Florida, along the Gulf of Mexico on the Atlantic coastal plain. An entrance to this park is at the intersection of Scenic Drive and Cinema Drive, one mile west of the intersection of Cinema Drive/Ridge Manor Blvd. and U.S. Highway 19. The park is named, in part, for Salt Spring, a saltwater spring explored to a depth of 351 feet (107 m). Cauldron Spring, also within the park, has been explored to 341 feet (104 m). The park includes four miles of Pasco County's coastal waters on the Gulf of Mexico.

Activities include picnicking, boating, fishing, hiking, and wildlife viewing. The park's wildlife include gray foxes, gopher tortoises, alligators, and West Indian manatees, as well as about 150 species of bird. Among the park's birds are raptors, wading birds, shore birds, and migratory song birds.

The park includes a half mile nature trail, a picnic pavilion, and an informational kiosk. Visitors can explore the park's waterways by boat, but there is no boat ramp as of yet. The park is new, and planned additions include hiking trails, primitive camping, group camping, picnicking and marked canoe/kayak trails. The park was named by Robert Pullen and CJ Bennett in a contest when the two were classmates at Hudson Elementary School.

The park is open from 8:00 am till sundown year round.
