= Seabranch Preserve State Park =

State park in Florida, United States

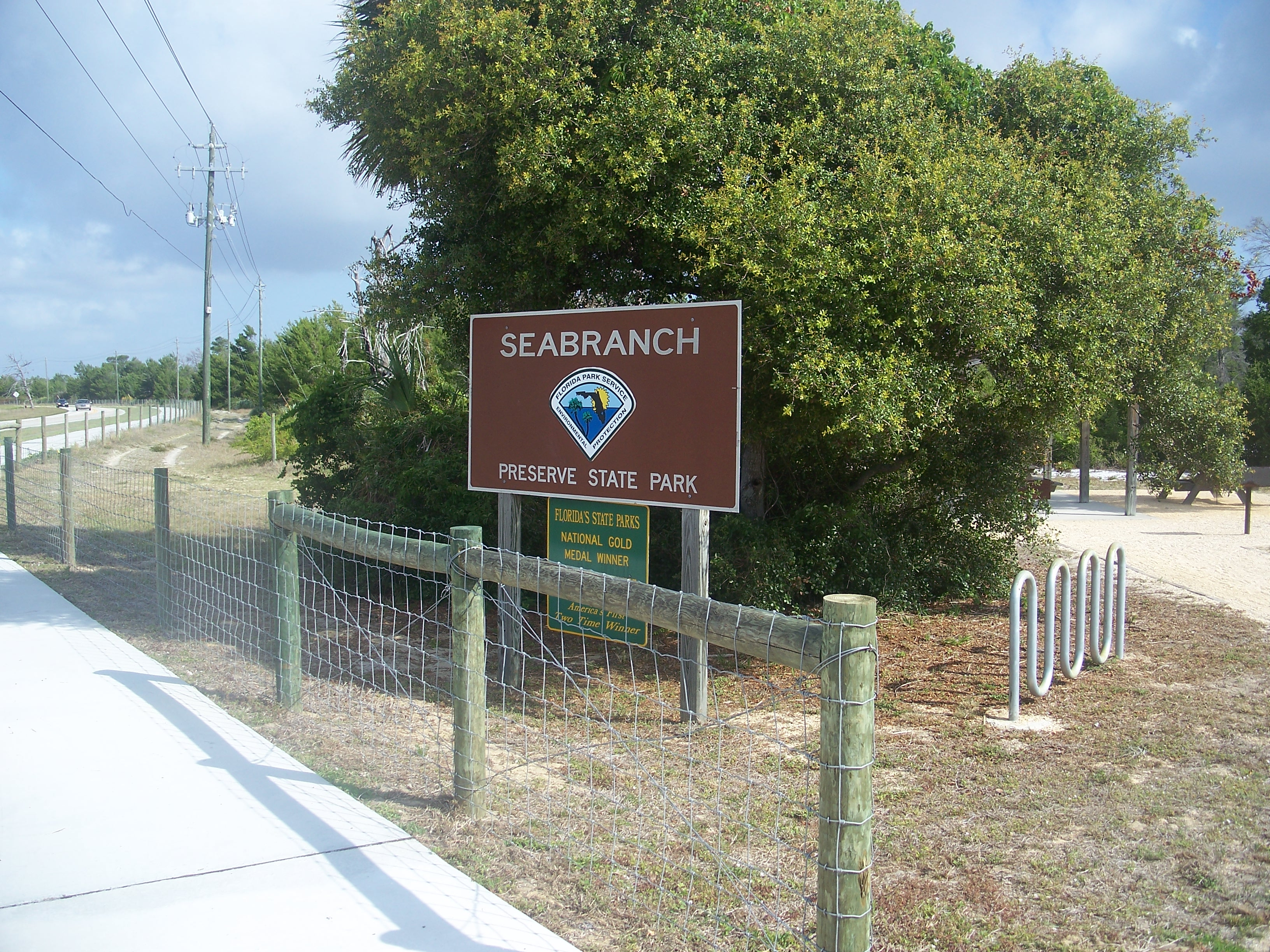
- A view of the old park sign

- Location within Florida Location within the United States
- Interactive map of Seabranch Preserve State Park
- Location: Martin County, Florida, United States
- Nearest city: Stuart, Florida
- Coordinates: 27°7′52.66″N 80°10′12.83″W
- Governing body: Florida Department of Environmental Protection

Seabranch Preserve State Park is a Florida State Park, located approximately ten miles south of Stuart, off A1A.

== Admission and hours ==
There is no entrance charge. Florida state parks are open between 8 a.m. and sundown every day of the year (including holidays).

== Climate ==
The park marks end of subtropical climate (Cfa), being the most northern place near the east coast of Florida with a tropical climate. It is approximately where the tropical monsoon climate (Am), being important in phytogeography, begins.
