= Ichetucknee Trace =

Florida Park Service property protecting a paleodrainage feature in Columbia County

- Location within Florida Location within the United States
- Interactive map of Ichetucknee Trace
- Location: Columbia County, Florida, United States
- Nearest city: Fort White
- Coordinates: 30°03′N 82°43′W
- Governing body: Florida Department of Environmental Protection
- Website: https://floridadep.gov/lands/environmental-services/documents/florida-forever-plan-ichetucknee-trace

Ichetucknee Trace is a state-managed conservation property in Columbia County, Florida, protecting a series of parcels along a paleodrainage feature of the same name.

The State of Florida started acquiring the property in the late 1990s under the then new Florida Forever program to safeguard the springshed. Individual acquisitions have included the McCormick, Rose, and Saylor sink hole properites. The state also purchased old limestone mines in the corridor to remove the threat to the underground conduit system. The property was originally administered by the Office of Greenways and Trails and is now managed by the Florida Park Service as a satellite of Ichetucknee Springs State Park.
