= Yellow River Marsh Preserve State Park =

State park in Florida, United States

- IUCN category IV (habitat/species management area)
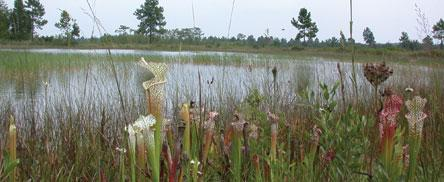

- Location within Florida Location within the United States
- Interactive map of Yellow River Marsh Preserve State Park
- Location: Santa Rosa County, Florida, United States
- Nearest city: Milton, Florida
- Coordinates: 30°29′3″N 87°4′22″W
- Area: 1,082.66 acres (438.14 ha)
- Governing body: Florida Department of Environmental Protection

Yellow River Marsh Preserve State Park is a Florida State Park located on Garcon Point, south of Milton, in northwestern Florida. The Yellow River (Pensacola Bay) begins in Alabama and flows into Pensacola Bay.

A small parking area, gazebo, and public access point are located on Dickerson City Road. Located on County Road 191, approximately one mile north of the intersection with County Road 281, and along both sides of the highway on Blackwater Bay.

== Ecology ==
More than 200 species of vascular plants occur in the preserve, including the white-top pitcher plant (Sarracenia leucophylla). Its wet prairie habitat supports carnivorous plants and grasses; fire helps limit the encroachment of shrubs and trees.

== Recreational Activities ==
The park has such amenities as birding, hiking, picnicking and wildlife viewing.

== Park Fees ==
There are no entrance fees associated with this park.
