= Ruth B. Kirby Gilchrist Blue Springs State Park =

State park in Florida

Gilchrist Blue Springs State Park
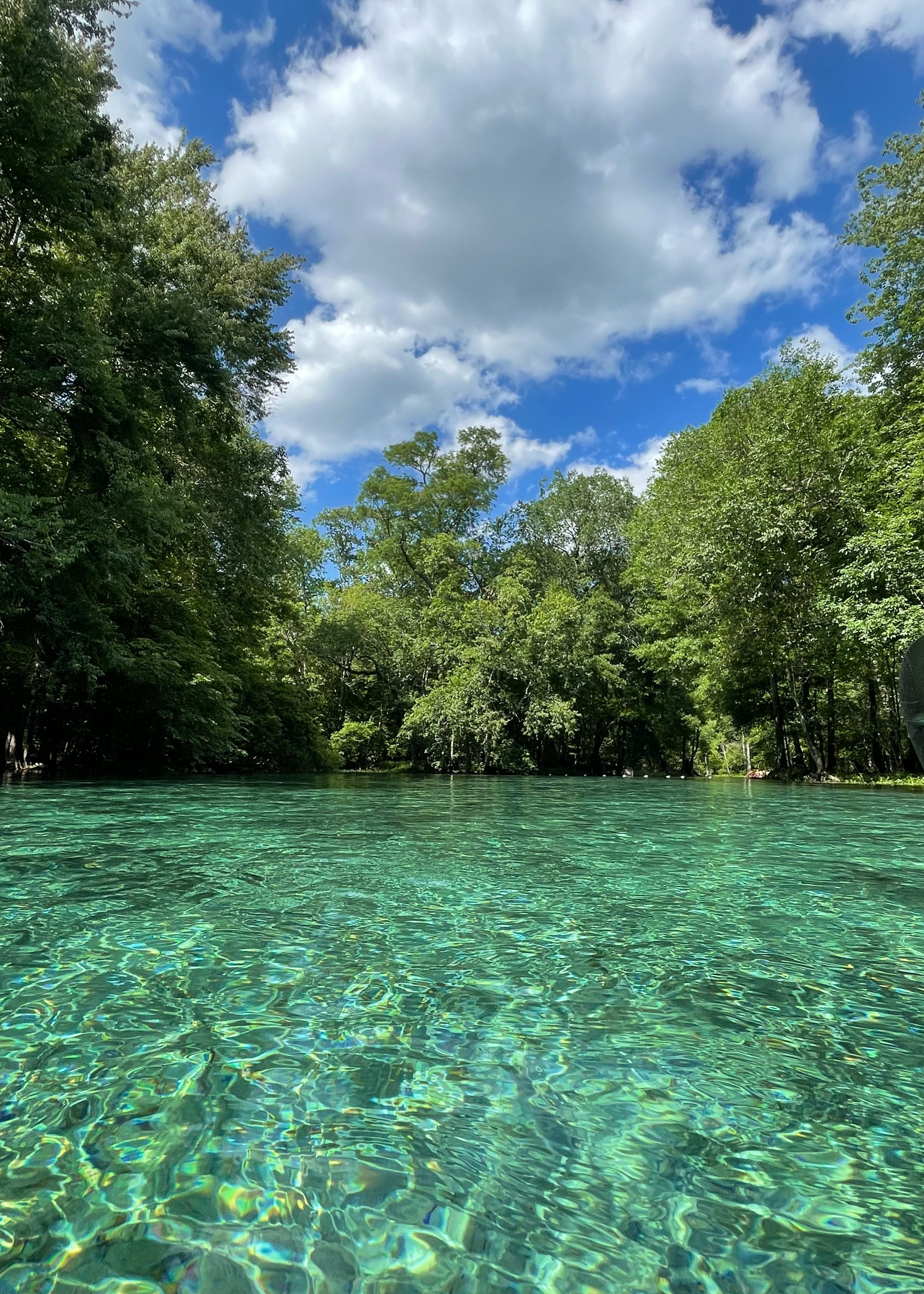
- A view of the park from the spring

- Location within Florida Location within the United States
- Interactive map of Gilchrist Blue Springs State Park
- Location: Gilchrist County, Florida, United States
- Nearest city: High Springs, Florida
- Coordinates: 29.829424°N 82.683636°W
- Area: 165 hectares (407 acres)
- Established: 2017

Gilchrist Blue Springs State Park is a state park in Gilchrist County, Florida, along the Santa Fe River. Operated as a private park for many years, the park was purchased by the state of Florida for $5.2 million and opened as Florida's 175th state park on November 1, 2017. It contains six natural springs, including Gilchrist Blue Spring, Little Blue Spring, Naked Spring, Kiefer Spring, and Johnson Spring. The park's full name is Ruth B. Kirby Gilchrist Blue Springs State Park.

== History ==
Ruth B. Kirby received the property that is now the state park as an engagement gift from Ed. C. Wright, her employer and fiancé, in 1958. While the couple never married, Kirby was the executor for Wright's estate after he died in 1969. Kirby and her family operated the property as a private park until it was sold to the State of Florida. In 2019, the park was renamed after Ruth B. Kirby in honor of her dedication to the springs.

The springs produce about 44 million gallons of water each day and run into the Santa Fe River. Guests have the opportunity to hike, picnic, camp, snorkel, swim, and paddle throughout the park. There is one concession stand for food and drink at the park. There are various photo opportunities among the scenic view. Some wildlife among the springs include: turtles, sunfish, bass, and catfish.
