= Suwannee River Wilderness State Trail =

Long-distance paddling trail in northern Florida, United States

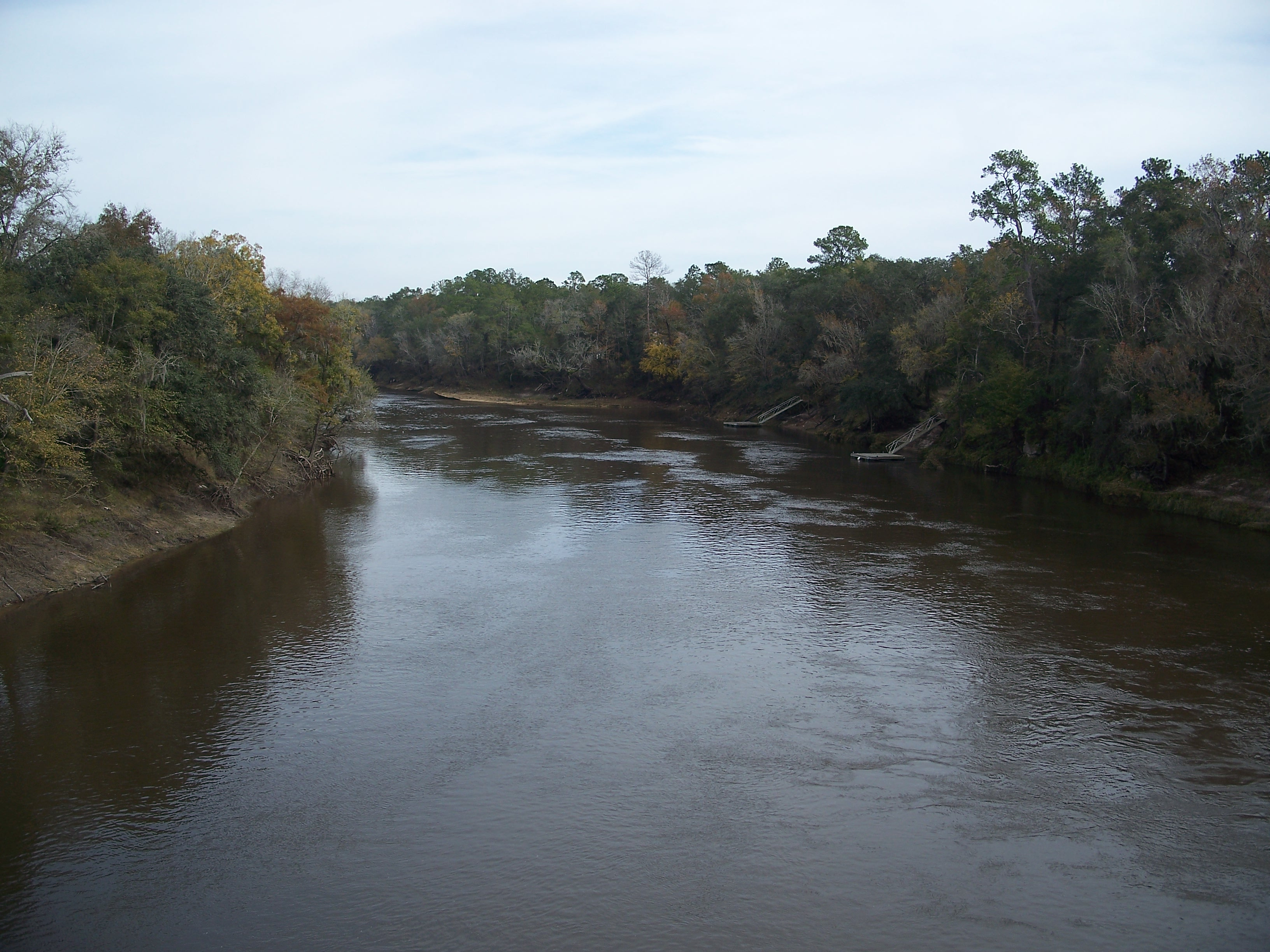
- Image of the Suwanee River from the Hal W. Adams Bridge

- Location within Florida Location within the United States
- Interactive map of Suwannee River Wilderness State Trail
- Location: Hamilton, Suwannee, Lafayette, and Dixie counties, Florida, United States
- Nearest city: White Springs
- Coordinates: 30°09′00″N 83°09′00″W
- Area: 74 acres (30 ha)
- Established: June 17, 2005; 21 years ago
- Governing body: Florida Department of Environmental Protection
- Website: https://www.floridastateparks.org/parks-and-trails/suwannee-river-wilderness-trail
- Length: 171 mi (275 km)
- Trailheads: Stephen Foster Folk Culture Center State Park (White Springs); Suwannee
- Use: Canoeing, kayaking

The Suwannee River Wilderness State Trail is a long-distance paddling trail managed by the Florida Park Service. The trail follows the Suwannee River for roughly 171 miles (275 km) through Hamilton, Suwannee, Lafayette, and Dixie counties from White Springs to the Gulf of Mexico. The trail is Florida's first long-distance paddling trail and it is organized around a series of hub communities, mostly state parks and small river towns, spaced roughly a day's paddle apart, with five overnight river camps between hubs.

The trail's overnight river camps are Woods Ferry, Holton Creek, Dowling Park, Peacock Slough, and Adams Tract. All five are owned by the Suwannee River Water Management District and are operated by the Division of Recreation and Parks under long-term lease agreements. Each camp is operated as a part of an adjoining state park: Woods Ferry as part of Stephen Foster Folk Culture Center State Park, Peacock Slough, Dowling Park, and Holton Creek as part of Suwannee River State Park, and Adams Tract as part of Ichetucknee Springs State Park. The five leased properties all together encompass over 74 acres (30 ha) of land.

Each river campsite has a screened sleeping platforms and basic sanitary facilities intended to accommodate multi-day trips down the Suwannee. The trail supports canoeing and kayaking as its primary uses, with fishing and wildlife viewing along its length.
