= Florida Forever =

Land conservation program

Florida Forever is a land conservation program in Florida. In 1999, the Florida Legislature passed the Florida Forever Act which was signed into law by former Florida governor, Jeb Bush, which would lead to the creation of the Florida Forever program. Since the program was created in July 2001, the state of Florida has purchased more than 1 million acres of land with a little over $3.8 billion (as of July 2020). Approximately 2.6 million acres have been purchased under the program and its predecessor, Preservation 2000 (P2000).

According to one 2011 poll, the program is popular and few Floridians favor cutting the funding for it.

In 2020, the program received $100 million as part of HB 5001.
