= Redwood Act (1978) =

1978 amendment to US National Park Service

The Redwood Act (also Redwood amendment) is a 1978 amendment to the US National Park Service General Authorities Act of 1970. The amendment is particularly notable for clarifying and supplementing the 1970 act and the National Park Service Organic Act of 1916 with the following two important sentences as the second and third to the General Authorities Act:

Congress declares that the national park system, which began with establishment of Yellowstone National Park in 1872, has since grown to include superlative natural, historic, and recreation areas in every major region of the United States, its territories and island possessions; that these areas, though distinct in character, are united through their inter-related purposes and resources into one national park system as cumulative expressions of a single national heritage; that, individually and collectively, these areas derive increased national dignity and recognition of their superlative environmental quality through their inclusion jointly with each other in one national park system preserved and managed for the benefit and inspiration of all the people of the United States; and that it is the purpose of this Act to include all such areas in the System and to clarify the authorities applicable to the system. Congress further reaffirms, declares, and directs that the promotion and regulation of the various areas of the National Park System, as defined in section 1c of this title, shall be consistent with and founded in the purpose established by section 1 of this title [the Organic Act provision quoted above], to the common benefit of all the people of the United States. The authorization of activities shall be construed and the protection, management, and administration of these areas shall be conducted in light of the high public value and integrity of the National Park System and shall not be exercised in derogation of the values and purposes for which these various areas have been established, except as may have been or shall be directly and specifically provided by Congress.

By this amendment the United States Congress reiterated the provisions of the Organic Act, and made equal all areas of the National Park System no matter the designation. This provides equal protection to all areas of the National Park System from impairment and/or derogation of their resources.

== See also ==
National Park Service
