= Tie Sing =

Chinese-American chef (1865–1918)

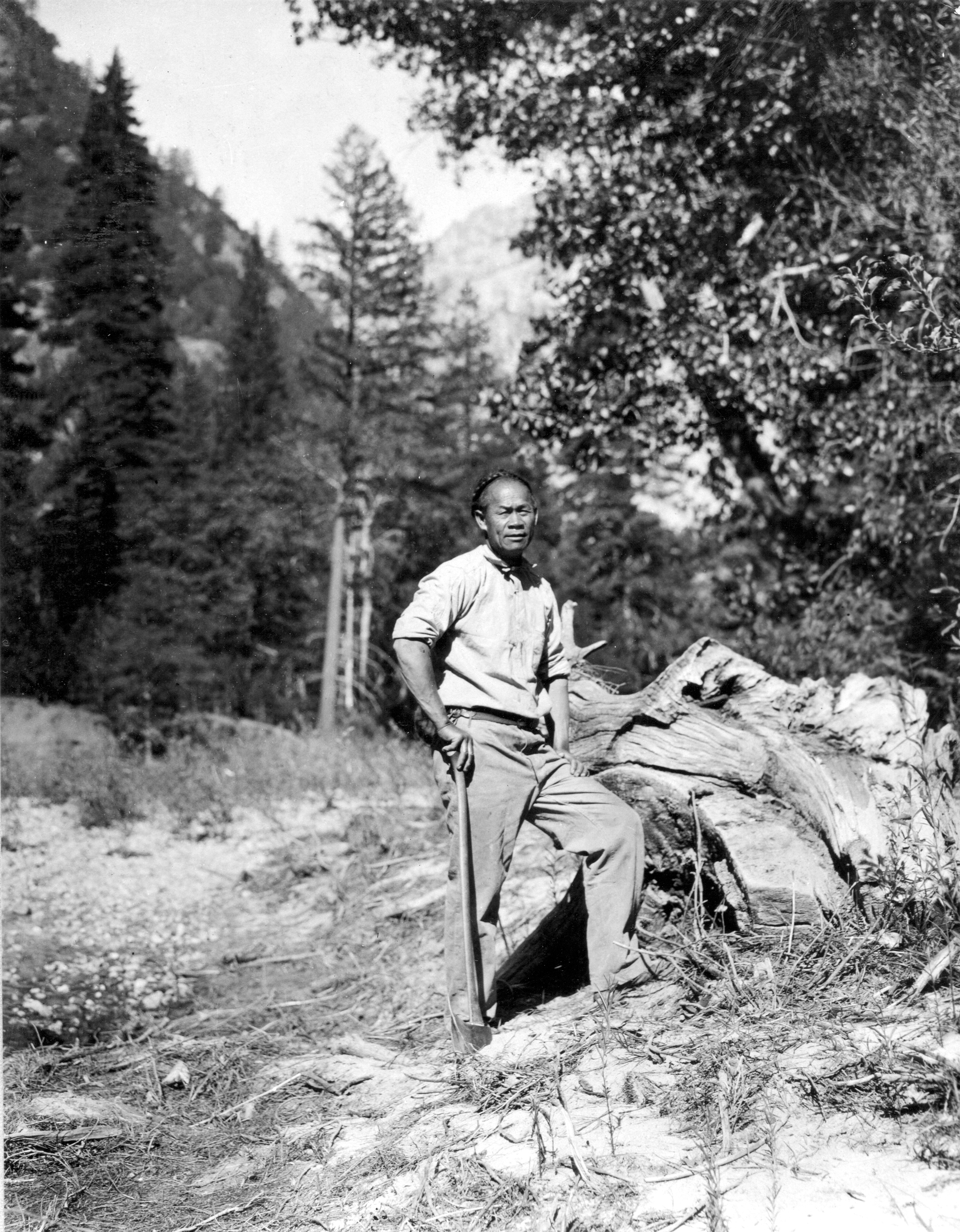
- Yosemite National Park, California. Tie Sing, a 21-year veteran cook of the U.S. Geological Survey, in the field. 1909.
- Born: September 1, 1865; Virginia City, Nevada, US
- Died: August 19, 1918 (aged 52); Hollister, California, US
- Occupation: Chef

Tie Sing (September 1, 1865 – August 19, 1918) was a Chinese American head chef for the U.S. Geological Survey at Yosemite.

== Early life ==
Tie Sing was born in Virginia City, Nevada, to Chinese immigrant parents. At age three, he was taken in by the family of future Supreme Court of Nevada judge Thomas Porter Hawley. He married his wife Lee Sing in China and had two children with her, including a daughter born around 1910. According to Lee Sing, Tie Sing also went by the name Lim Wee Don, which he used when traveling to China for visits. Due to the Chinese Exclusion Act, Tie Sing never gained US citizenship and with the introduction of the Geary Act, he registered as a resident alien and his wife and his children had to remain in Hong Kong. Birth records were not widespread in Virginia City at the time of Tie Sing's birth and a fire had destroyed other records showing that he was born in the United States.

== Career ==
Between 1888 and 1918, Tie Sing was the head chef for the U.S. Geological Survey and was known for his innovative spirit that enabled good food to be made in the backcountry despite undeveloped infrastructure. Tie Sing was known for wrapping meat in wet newspaper and cooling it in the breeze. He would also drape rounds of biscuit dough on working mules, using their body heat to rise the dough.

In 1899, Sing Peak was named after Tie Sing by the U.S. Geological Survey for his outstanding service. This honor was unique for being conferred during Tie Sing's lifetime and also during a time of heightened racism and xenophobia against Chinese Americans.

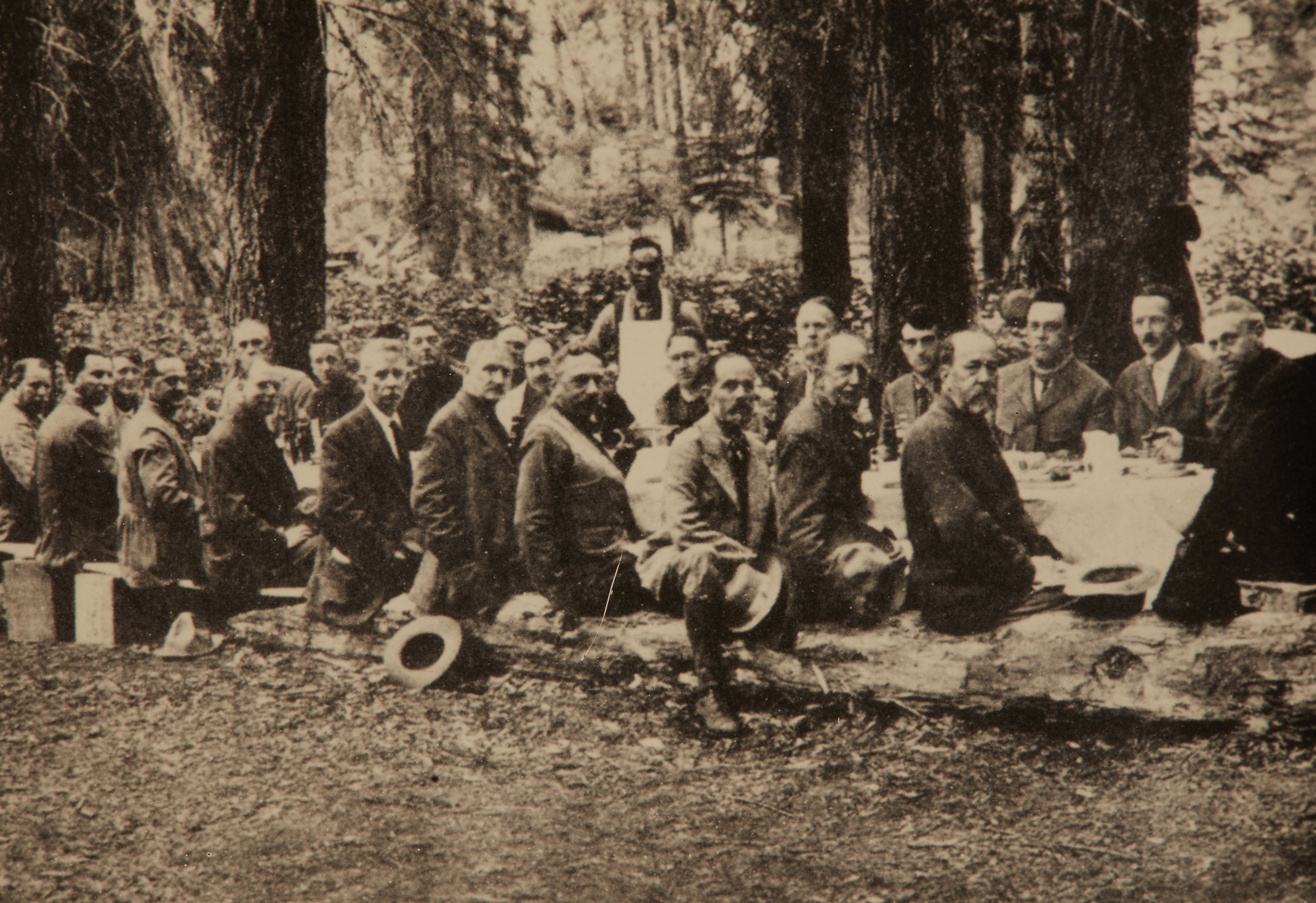
Tie Sing (middle) with the Mather Mountain Party. 1915.

In 1915, Tie Sing was hired by Stephen Mather to cook for business and cultural leaders at a two-week wilderness expedition. Mather's intention was to convince people in power to preserve nature by giving them an enjoyable experience through Tie Sing's cooking, telling park supervisors that while nature was a “splendid thing” when experienced by a content person, “give him a poor breakfast after he has had a bad night's sleep, and he will not care how fine your scenery is”. Mather's plan worked, and the National Park Service was established a year after in 1916.

During World War I, Tie Sing was noted for using nearly all his savings to purchase Liberty bonds and Thrift Stamps to show his support for the United States. In December 1917, Tie Sing joined the American Red Cross. In July 1918, Tie Sing was set to serve as a cook to Secretary of the Treasury William Gibbs McAdoo during a ten-day visit to Yosmite

Tie Sing died on August 19, 1918, while working with a USGS surveying crew led by Edward Percy Davis in San Benito County, California. The crew was being transported on a wagon driven by teamster Gustine Gallon when part of the road beneath them collapsed while on Bird Creek Road (now part of Cinega Road). The wagon overturned and Tie Sing fell into a creek, where he hit his head on a rock. San Benito County Sheriff Jeremiah Croxon drove Tie Sing to Hollister, where he was pronounced dead by pharmacist Richard O’Bannon.

Following an inquest, Tie Sing's body was set to be sent to Hong Kong for burial. Tie Sing's estate was estimated to have a worth of $1,653.43 (equivalent to $35,391 in 2025), though his wife in Hong Kong had not received a share as of 1920.

== Legacy ==
Tie Sing's contributions remained relatively unknown until 2011, when park ranger Yenyen Chan co-produced a YouTube documentary highlighting the history of Chinese Americans in Yosemite. This prompted Jack Shu to propose an annual pilgrimage to Sing Peak in honor of Tie Sing's legacy, as well as the contributions of Chinese Americans to Yosemite as a whole. Since 2013, the Yosemite-Sing Peak Pilgrimage has been an annual six-day hiking event to learn about Yosemite's history.

== See also ==
- Anti-Chinese sentiment in the United States – History of racial discrimination
- Asian Americans in California – Ethnic group in the US
- Coolie – Offensive term for a labourer from Asia
- History of Chinese Americans
- John Muir – Scottish-American naturalist (1838–1914)
