= Thomas Thorkildsen =

- Born: 1869; Wisconsin
- Died: 1950
- Occupation: Businessman
- Spouse: Dora Garinger

Thomas Thorkildsen (1869-1950) was an American businessman. He became known as the "Borax King" after his ownership of borax mines in California made him a millionaire.

== Biography ==
=== Early life ===
Thomas Thorkildsen was born in 1869 in Wisconsin. His father was a lumberjack who had immigrated from Denmark.

=== Career ===
He worked for the Pacific Coast Borax Company, owned by Francis Marion Smith, in Chicago and later at the Death Valley, where Stephen Mather was his boss. He resigned in 1898 and purchased a borax mine in the Frazier Mountain, Ventura County. With Mather, he founded the Thorkildsen-Mather Borax Company. In 1905, he purchased another borax mine in Tick Canyon, a canyon in the Santa Clarita Valley. He became a millionnaire thanks to this second mine. Additionally, he became known as the "Borax King."

=== Personal life ===
He married Dora Garinger. In 1912, they moved into a Craftsman-style estate at the top of Alpine Drive overlooking Coldwater Canyon in Beverly Hills, California. It spanned seventeen acres. A year later, they purchased eleven more acres adjacent to it. They sold it to Kirk B. Johnson, an oilman, in 1921. The house was torn down and subdivided in the 1960s. When he divorced, he moved into an estate in Los Feliz, Los Angeles called Briarcliff Manor, which became known for extravagant parties. He died in 1950.
