= National Park Service training centers =

The U.S. National Park Service has a long history of specialized training needs. One of the service's earliest training programs was Ranger Skills, a nine-week course held at the Grand Canyon. Over the years, the variety of skills has increased and the bureau has created training centers to meet those needs.

== Centers ==
=== Horace M. Albright Training Center ===
Located on the South Rim of the Grand Canyon, the Albright Training Center provides resources, context, and stimulus for personal and professional growth in support of the National Park Service mission.

=== Capital Training Center ===
The Capital Training Center is located in Washington, D.C. It serves as the headquarters for the National Park Service's Employee Development program and provides training to the park employees in the Washington area. Their programs emphasize Planning, Design, and Construction; Recreation and Conservation Program; Information Management; Specialty Field; and Organizational Development. The Capital Training Center also coordinates special training programs, including USDA's Graduate School, the Albright-Wirth Grant Program Team, Team Leadership Program, Executive Potential Program, Executive Leadership for Middle Level Employees, New Leader Program, and the Aspiring Leader Program.

=== NPS/Federal Law Enforcement Training Center ===
The Federal Law Enforcement Training Center (FLETC) is an interagency federal police training academy run by the U.S. Department of Homeland Security in Glynco, Georgia. All federal agencies with police powers train at FLETC. The National Park Service has a full-time staff on duty to manage the Park Ranger trainees at the site. State and local law enforcement agencies can make use of the facility. The Center teaches the full range of law enforcement skills, from taking fingerprints to tracking financial transactions, riding patrol protecting VIPs, searching a crime scene, and securing a building.

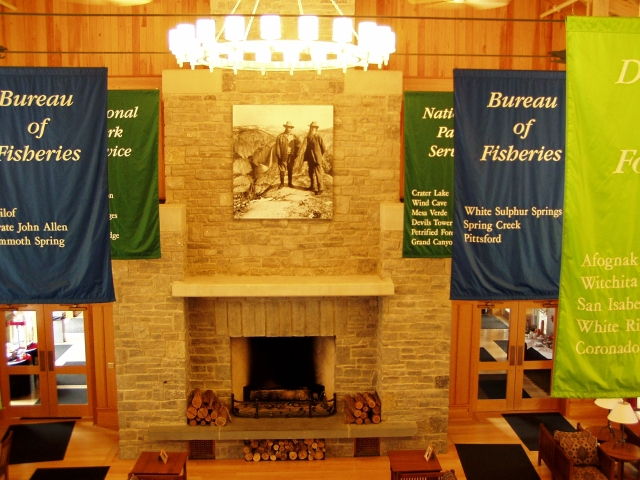
Lobby of the 'Commons' at the National Conservation Training Center

=== Historic Preservation Training Center ===
The Historic Preservation Training Center (HPTC) teaches the craft skills that created the fabric of America. Trainees come to Frederick, Maryland to learn historic carpentry, masonry and a myriad of other skills needed to maintain the structures of America's heritage.

=== Stephen T. Mather Training Center ===
The National Park Service established Stephen T. Mather Training Center in 1964 to teach interpretive skills, administrative skills and a variety of skills not being taught at the Albright center. Located in Storer College in Harpers Ferry, West Virginia, the facility makes use of the opportunities presented by having the Harpers Ferry National Historical Park surrounding the facility.

=== National Conservation Training Center ===
The National Conservation Training Center, located in Shepherdstown, West Virginia, is the primary training center and Home of the U. S. Fish and Wildlife Service. Established in 1997 by the U.S. Fish and Wildlife Service, the center was created to train conservation professionals from all sectors in a wide range of technical and non technical conservation topics.

=== National Center for Preservation Technology and Training ===
The National Center for Preservation Technology and Training (NCPTT) was established by the United States Congress in 1994 to advance the application of science and technology to historic preservation. Working in the fields of archeology, architecture, landscape architecture and materials conservation, NCPTT accomplishes its mission through training, education, research, technology transfer and partnerships. The offices and laboratory facilities of NCPTT are located in Lee H. Nelson Hall on the campus of Northwestern State University in Natchitoches, Louisiana.
