= Thorkildsen-Mather Borax Company =

Thorkildsen-Mather Borax Company was a borax mining company founded in 1898 by Stephen Mather and Thomas Thorkildsen. The two men were both employees of Francis Marion "Borax" Smith's Pacific Coast Borax Company, but they left the company to form this new company and went into direct competition with their former boss. The company was later renamed Sterling Borax. Francis Marion Smith subsequently bought out their company in 1911.
