= National Park Service General Authorities Act =

The National Park Service General Authorities Act of 1970 is an amendment to the National Park Service Organic Act of 1916. The amendment included the following:

Congress declares that the National Park Service, which began with establishment of Yellowstone National Park in 1872, has since grown to include superlative natural, historic, and recreation areas in every major region of the United States, its territories and island possessions; that these areas, though distinct in character, are united through their inter-related purposes and resources into one national park system as cumulative expressions of a single national heritage; that, individually and collectively, these areas derive increased national dignity and recognition of their superb environmental quality through their inclusion jointly with each other in one national park system preserved and managed for the benefit and inspiration of all the people of the United States; and that it is the purpose of this Act to include all such areas in the System and to clarify the authorities applicable to the system.

By this amendment, the Congress of the United States required the entire National Park System be managed as a whole, and not as constituent parts.

== See also ==
- Redwood Act (1978)
