= National Park Service =

United States federal agency

Coordinates: 38.8944°N 77.0426°W

- National Park Service arrowhead insignia

- Guidon of the National Park Service

Agency overview
- Formed: August 25, 1916; 110 years ago
- Jurisdiction: United States
- Headquarters: Main Interior Building; 1849 C Street NW; Washington, D.C.; 20240, U.S.
- Employees: About 20,000 (2022) (279,000 volunteers in 2019)
- Annual budget: $3.265 billion (FY2022)
- Agency executive: Jessica Bowron, Acting Director of the National Park Service
- Parent department: United States Department of the Interior
- Key document: National Park Service Organic Act
- Website: nps.gov

Map
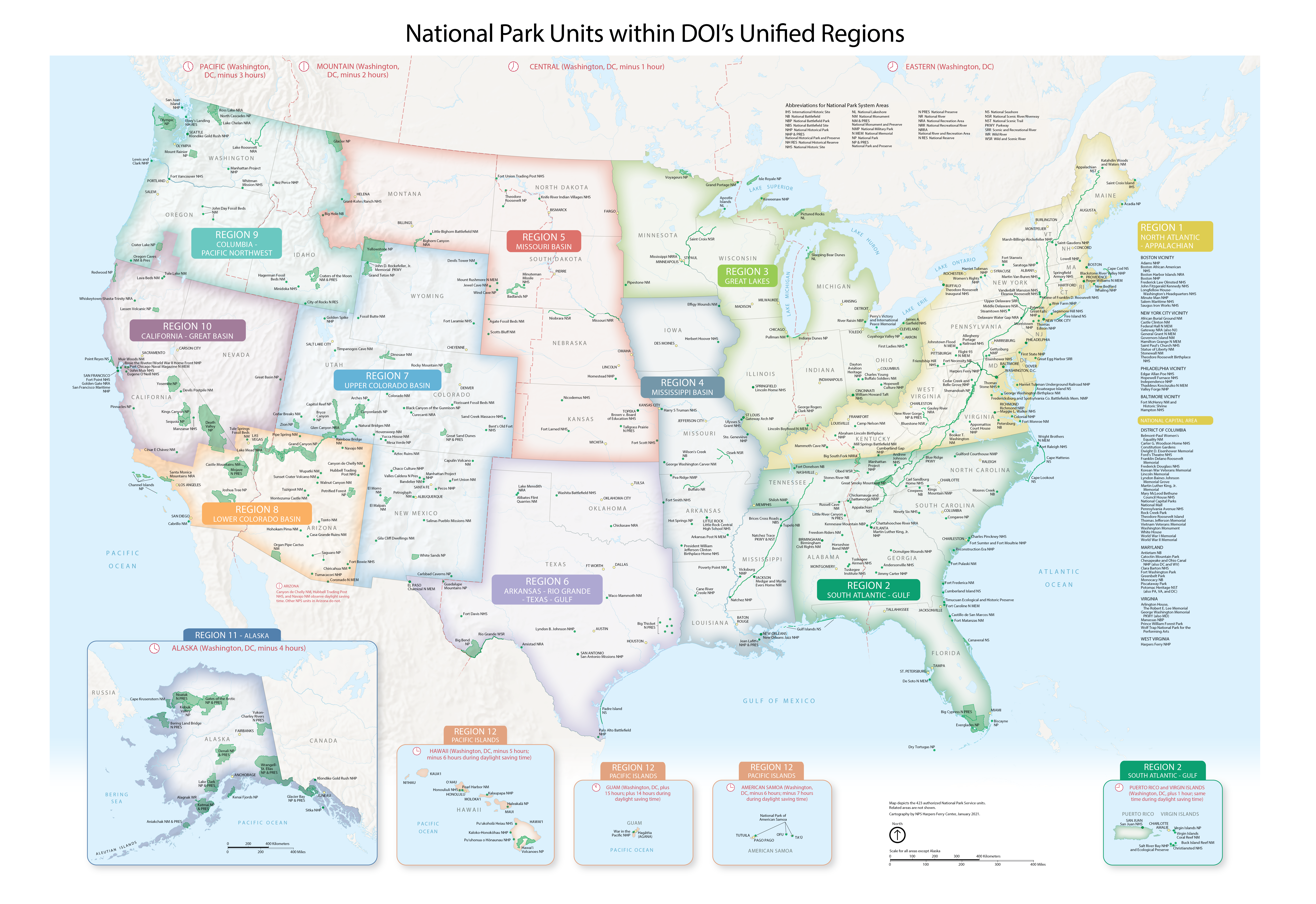

The National Park Service (NPS) is an agency of the United States Department of the Interior. The service manages all national parks, most national monuments; and other natural, historical, and recreational properties, with various title designations. The United States Congress created the agency on August 25, 1916, through the National Park Service Organic Act. Its headquarters is in Washington, D.C., within the main headquarters of the Department of the Interior.

The NPS employs about 20,000 people in 434 units covering over 85 million acres (34 million ha) in all 50 states, the District of Columbia, and U.S. territories. In 2019, the service had more than 279,000 volunteers. The agency is charged with preserving the ecological and historical integrity of the places entrusted to its management and with making them accessible for public use and enjoyment.

== History ==
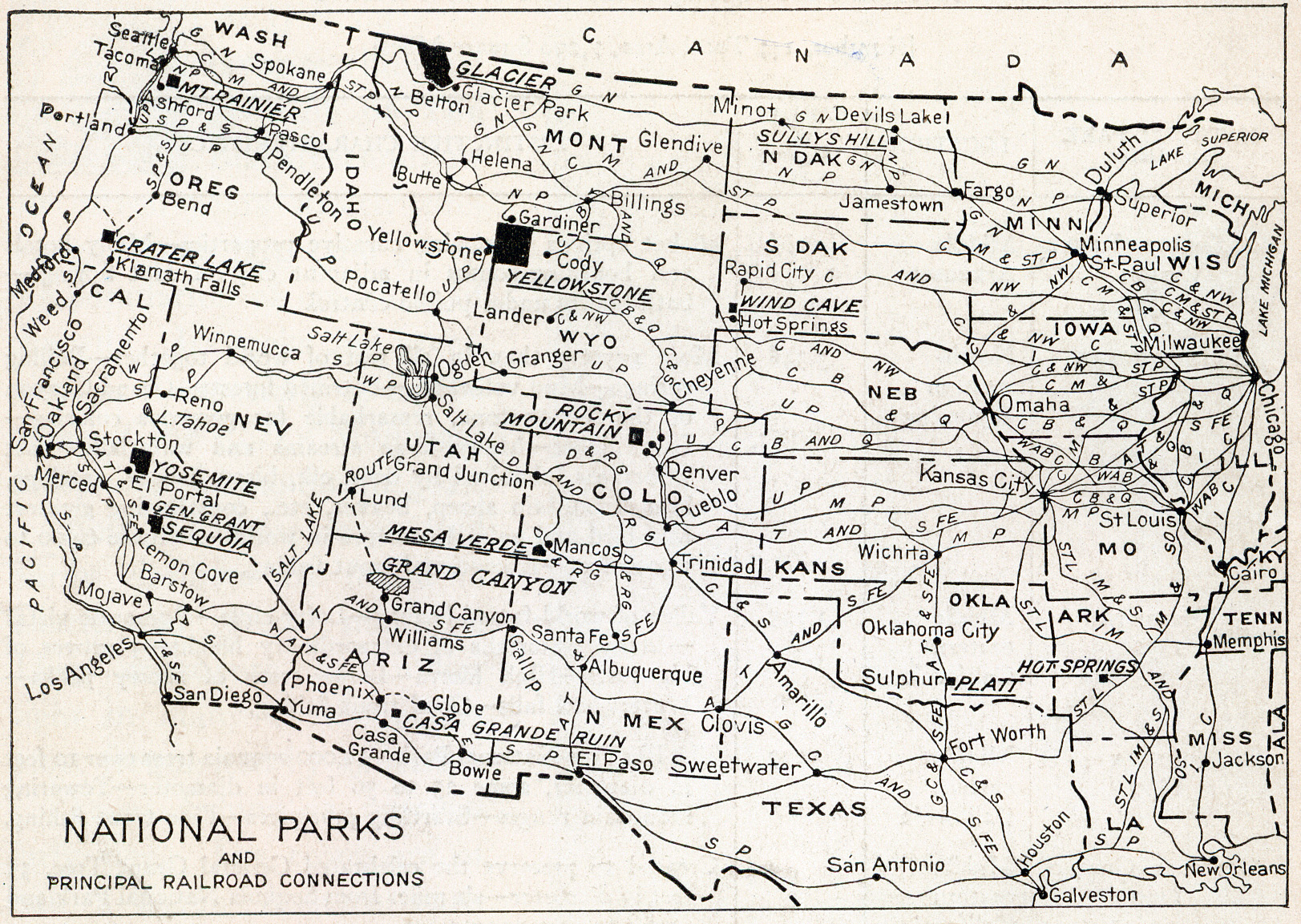
In 1916, a portfolio of nine major parks was published to generate interest. Printed on each brochure was a map showing the parks and principal railroad connections.

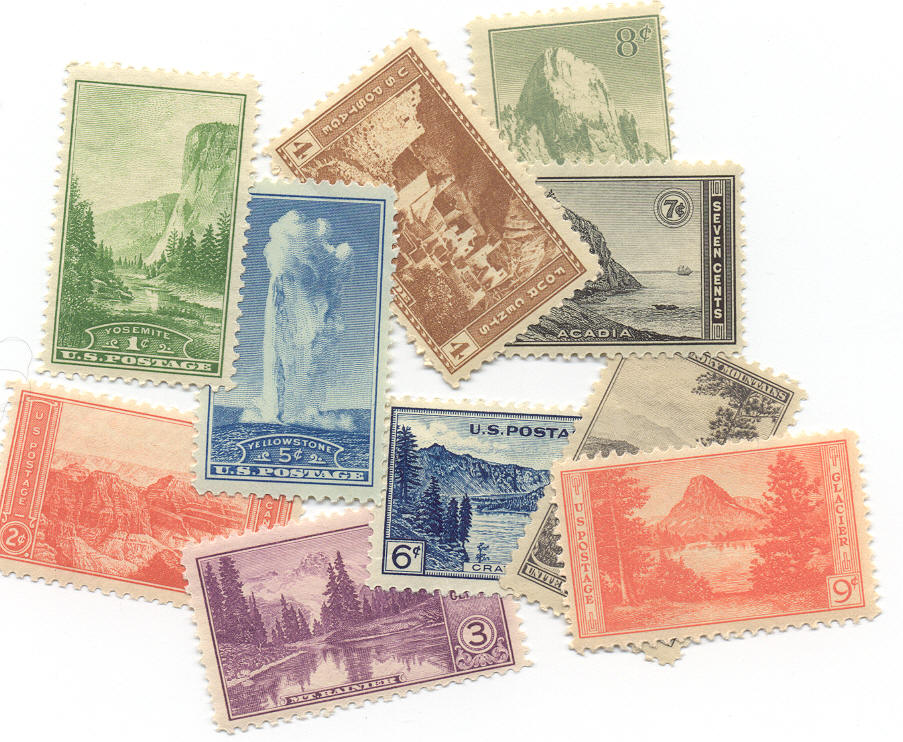
In 1934, a series of ten postage stamps was issued to commemorate the reorganization and expansion of the National Park Service.

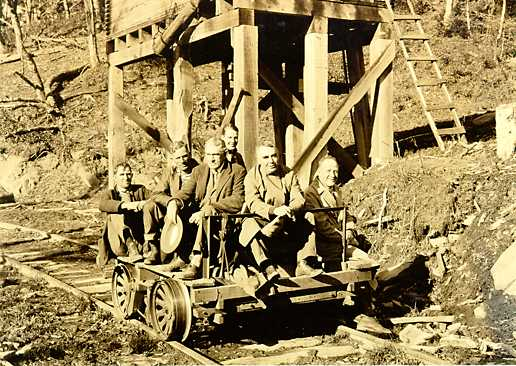
NPS Preliminary Survey party, Great Smoky Mountains, 1931

Artist George Catlin, during an 1832 trip to the Dakotas, was perhaps the first to suggest the concept of a national park. Indian civilization, wildlife, and wilderness were all in danger, wrote Catlin, unless they could be preserved "by some great protecting policy of government ... in a magnificent park ... A nation's Park, containing man and beast, in all the wild[ness] and freshness of their nature's beauty!" Yellowstone National Park was created as the first national park in the United States. In 1872, there was no state government to manage it (Wyoming was a U.S. territory at that time), so the federal government managed it directly through the army, including the famed African American Buffalo Soldier units.

The movement for an independent agency to oversee these federal lands was spearheaded by business magnate and conservationist Stephen Mather. With the help of journalist Robert Sterling Yard, Mather ran a publicity campaign for the Department of the Interior. They wrote numerous articles that praised the scenic and historic qualities of the parks and their possibilities for educational, inspirational, and recreational benefits.

This campaign resulted in the creation of the NPS. On August 25, 1916, President Woodrow Wilson signed the National Park Service Organic Act that mandated the agency "to conserve the scenery and the natural and historic objects and wildlife therein, and to provide for the enjoyment of the same in such manner and by such means as will leave them unimpaired for the enjoyment of future generations". Mather became the first director of the newly formed NPS.

On March 3, 1933, President Herbert Hoover signed the Reorganization Act of 1933. The act gave the president the authority to transfer national monuments from one governmental department to another. Later that summer, new president Franklin D. Roosevelt made use of this power after NPS Deputy Director Horace M. Albright suggested that the NPS, rather than the War Department, should manage historic American Civil War sites.

President Roosevelt agreed and issued two executive orders to implement the reorganization. These two executive orders transferred to the NPS all of the War Department's historic sites as well as national monuments that the Department of Agriculture had managed and parks in and around Washington, D.C. that an independent federal office had previously operated.

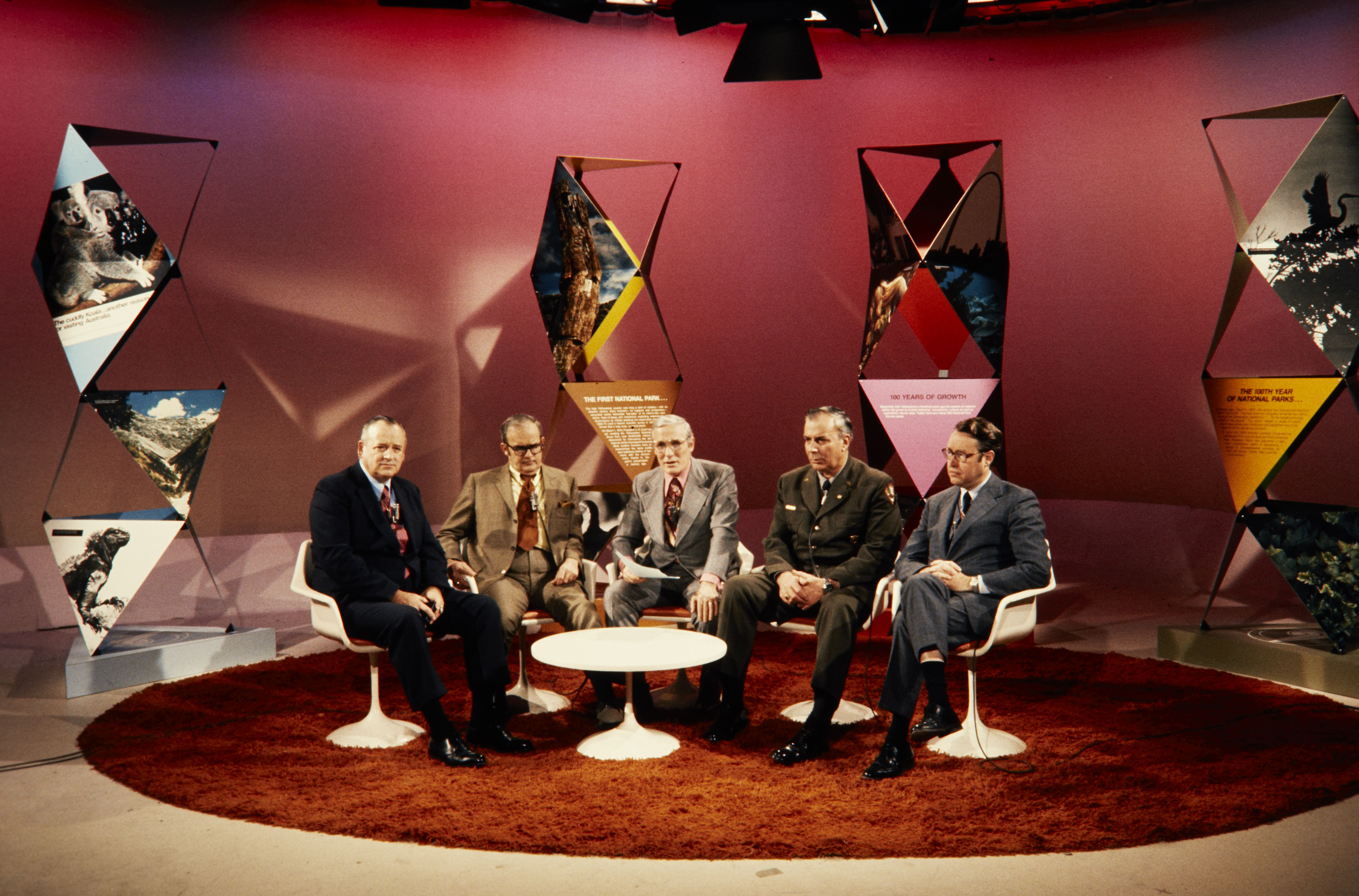
NPS staff sitting on the set for the 1972 Centennial for the creation of the first National Park (the Yellowstone NP), in a NBC Today Show. Left to right: George Hartzog, William Everhart, Frank McGee and Jack K. Anderson.

The popularity of the parks after the end of the World War II left them overburdened with demands that the NPS could not meet. In 1951, Conrad Wirth became director of the NPS and began to bring park facilities up to the standards that the public was expecting. In 1952, with the support of President Dwight D. Eisenhower, Wirth began Mission 66, a ten-year effort to upgrade and expand park facilities for the 50th anniversary of the Park Service. New parks were added to preserve unique resources and existing park facilities were upgraded and expanded.

In 1966, as the Park Service turned 50 years old, emphasis began to turn from just saving great and wonderful scenery and unique natural features to making parks accessible to the public. Director George Hartzog began the process with the creation of the National Lakeshores and then National Recreation Areas.

=== Resource stewardship policies ===
==== 1963: The Leopold Report ====
A 1963 report titled "Wildlife Management in the National Parks" was prepared by a five-member advisory board on Wildlife Management, appointed by United States Secretary of the Interior Stewart Udall. In later years, this report came to be referred to by its chairman and principal author, A. Starker Leopold. The Leopold Report was just fourteen pages in length, but it set forth ecosystem management recommendations that would guide parks policy until it was revisited in 2012.

The Leopold Report was the first concrete plan for managing park visitors and ecosystems under unified principles. Park management issues and controversies addressed in this report included the difficulties of managing elk populations in Yellowstone National Park and how "overprotection from natural ground fires" in California's Sequoia National Park, Kings Canyon National Park, and Yosemite National Park had begun to threaten groves of Giant Sequoia with catastrophic wildfires. The report also established a historical baseline that read, "The goal of managing the national parks and monuments should be to preserve, or where necessary to recreate, the ecologic scene as viewed by the first European visitors." This baseline would guide ecological restoration in national parks until a climate change adaptation policy, "Resist-Adapt-Direct", was later established in 2021.

==== 2012: Revisiting Leopold: Resource Stewardship in the National Parks ====
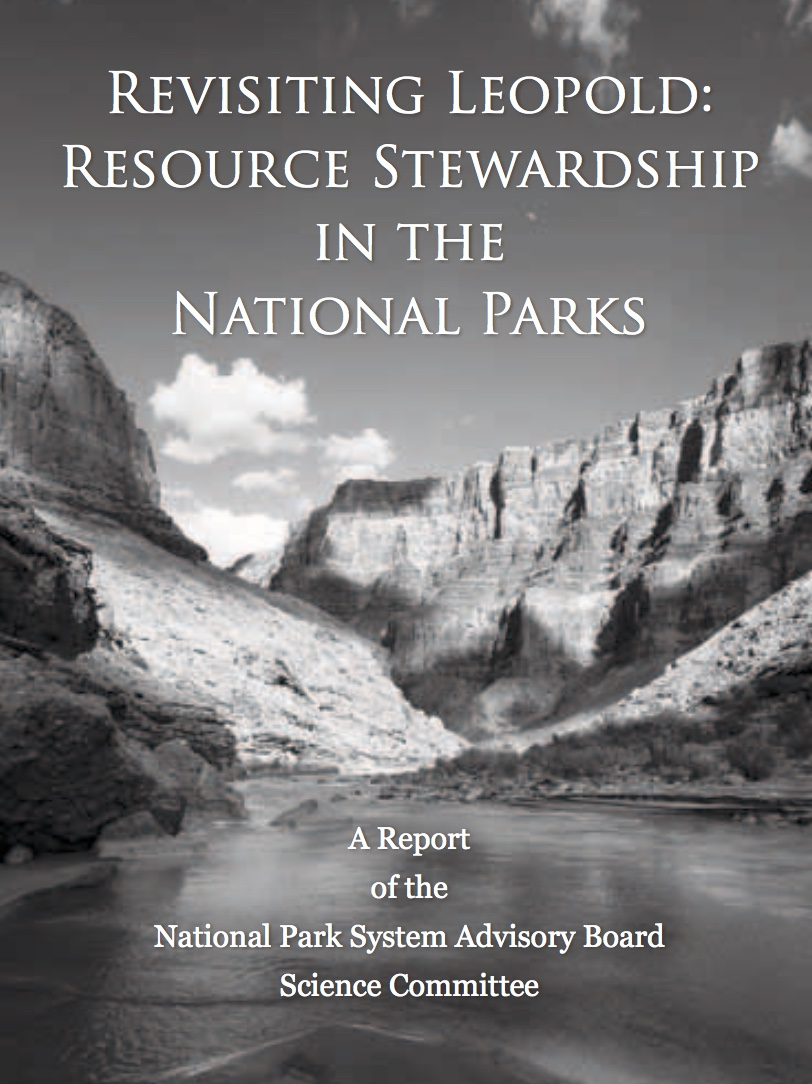
NPS publication, 2012

National Parks director Jonathan Jarvis charged the twelve-member NPS Advisory Board Science Committee to take a fresh look at the ecological issues and make recommendations for updating the original Leopold Report. The committee published their 23-page report in 2012, titled, "Revisiting Leopold: Resource Stewardship in the National Parks". The report recommended that parks leadership "manage for change while confronting uncertainty."

"... New and emerging scientific disciplines — including conservation biology, global change science, and genomics — along with new technological tools like high-resolution remote sensing can provide significant information for constructing contemporary tactics for NPS stewardship. This knowledge is essential to a National Park Service that is science-informed at all organizational levels and able to respond with contemporary strategies for resource management and ultimately park stewardship."

==== 2021: Resist–Accept–Direct (RAD): A Framework for the 21st-century Natural Resource Manager ====
The "Revisiting Leopold" report mentioned climate change three times and "climate refugia" once, but it did not prescribe or offer any management tactics that could help park managers with the problems of climate change. Hence, the 2020 NPS-led report specific to the need for climate adaptation: "Resist–Accept–Direct (RAD): A Framework for the 21st-century Natural Resource Manager." This "Natural Resource Report" has ten authors. Among them are four associated with the National Park Service, three with the US Fish and Wildlife Service, and two with the US Geological Survey — all of which are government agencies within the US Department of Interior.

The report's Executive Summary, points to "intensifying global change."

"... The convention of using baseline conditions to define goals for today's resource management is increasingly untenable, presenting practical and philosophical challenges for managers. As formerly familiar ecological conditions continue to change, bringing novelty, surprise, and uncertainty, natural resource managers require a new, shared approach to make conservation decisions.... The RAD (Resist–Accept–Direct) decision framework has emerged over the past decade as a simple tool that captures the entire decision space for responding to ecosystems facing the potential for rapid, irreversible ecological change."

The three RAD options are:

- Resist the trajectory, by working to maintain or restore ecosystem composition, structure, processes, or function on the basis of historical or acceptable current conditions;
- Accept the trajectory, by allowing ecosystem composition, structure, processes, or function to change autonomously; or
- Direct the trajectory, by actively shaping ecosystem composition, structure, processes, or function toward preferred new conditions.

The RAD framework emerged from efforts by the NPS and partners since 2015 to hone a tool that could integrate into standard resource-management planning processes and thereby foster strategic thinking and clear communication about how to steward transforming ecosystems. It built on the Resist–Accept–Guide framework first proposed in the 2012 book Beyond Naturalness: Rethinking Park and Wilderness Stewardship in an Era of Rapid Change. The NPS and partners in 2021 replaced the 2012 term "guide" with "direct." This explicitly recognized the potential for strong intervention at key points to foster preferred new conditions. Initially, the NPS experimented with the term "accommodate" in place of "accept." This early formulation appeared in a 2016 NPS publication: Coastal Adaptation Strategies Handbook. Another interagency publication in 2016 also used the term "accommodate": Resource Management and Operations in Central North Dakota: Climate change scenario planning workshop summary. In 2020, the "Resist-Accept-Direct" framework was used in a paper published in the journal Fisheries. Eighteen researchers from federal and state agencies and universities collaborated in this effort, which included short case studies of where and how this framework had already been applied.

The interagency efforts to forge a climate-adaptive framework culminated in a January 2022 series of six articles in the journal BioScience. These were grouped in the "Special Section on the Resist–Accept–Direct Framework." In 2024, the RAD Framework was included in an NPS policy memorandum titled "Managing National Parks in an Era of Climate Change." That memorandum also links to the three previous statements pertaining to NPS climate change responses and adaptation (2012, 2014, and 2015).

==== 2025 ====
In 2025 the NPS underwent a period of intense workforce contraction and political scrutiny during Donald Trump's second term as president of the United States. On 14 February 2025, more than 1000 probationary and lower-seniority NPS employees were dismissed in an event widely referred to by staff and media as the "Valentine’s Day Massacre". The cuts were followed by buyouts and early retirements for longer-serving rangers and specialists, as well as a federal hiring freeze that prevented most vacant positions from being refilled. Advocacy groups such as the National Parks Conservation Association (NPCA) reported that by mid-2025 the NPS had lost roughly 25% of its permanent workforce since January 2025.

These conditions were further tested in October 2025, when a federal government shutdown began after Congress failed to pass appropriations legislation. The Interior Department's contingency plan directed that most of the more than 400 NPS units remain at least partially open, while furloughing roughly 9,200–9,300 employees—about two-thirds of NPS staff—and keeping only limited "excepted" personnel such as law enforcement, emergency responders and dispatchers on duty.

== National Park System ==
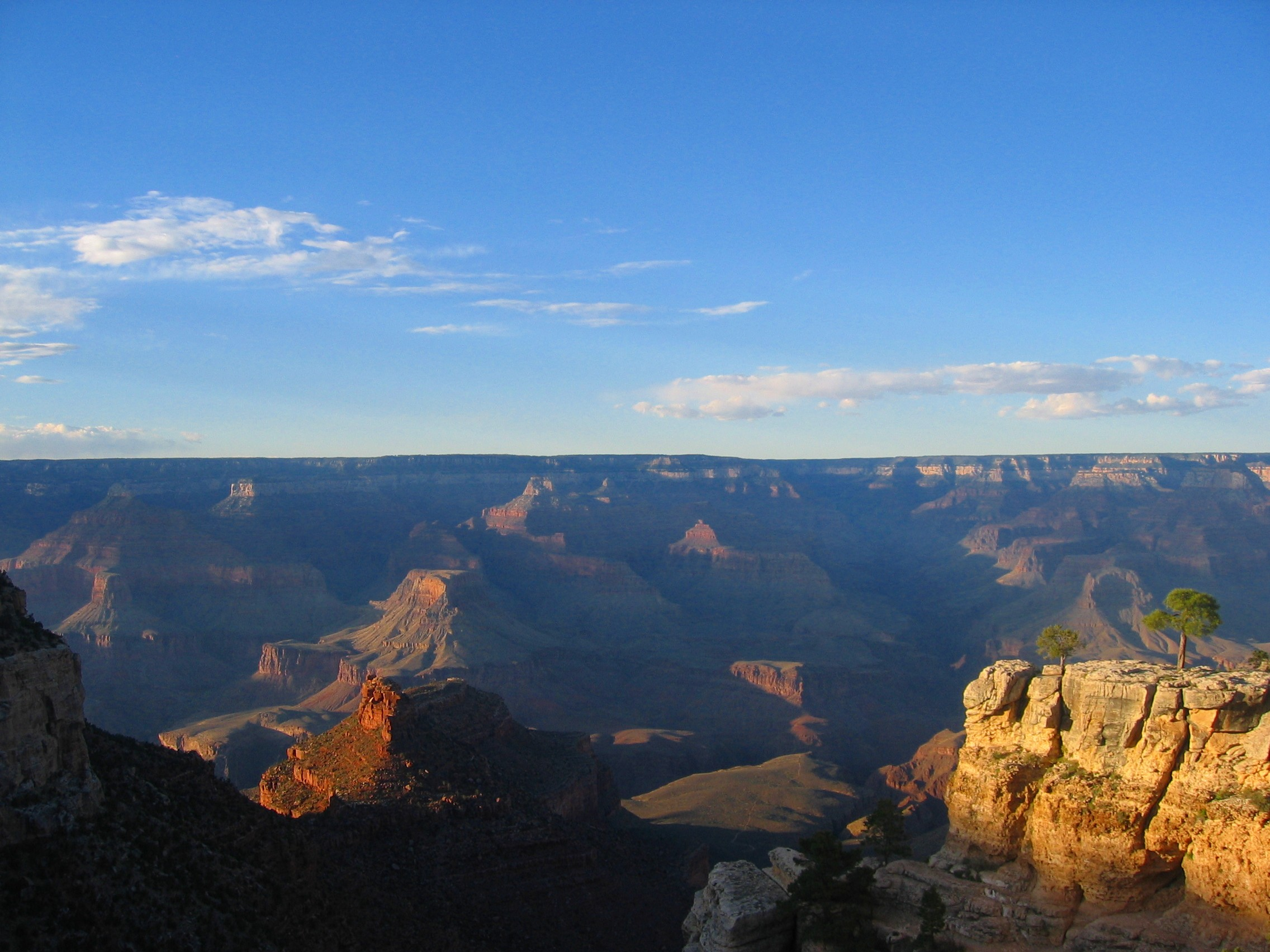
Grand Canyon National Park, south rim of canyon.

The National Park System includes all properties managed by the National Park Service, which have a wide variety of titles or designations. The system as a whole is considered to be a national treasure of the United States, and some of the more famous national parks and monuments are sometimes referred to as "crown jewels".

The system encompasses approximately 85.1 million acres (0.344 million km^{2}), of which 2.6 million acres (0.011 million km^{2}) remain in private ownership. The largest unit is Wrangell–St. Elias National Park and Preserve, Alaska. At 13,200,000 acres (53,000 km^{2}), it is over 16 percent of the entire system. The smallest unit in the system is Thaddeus Kosciuszko National Memorial, Pennsylvania, at 0.02 acres (80 m^{2}).

In addition to administering its units and other properties, the NPS also provides technical and financial assistance to several affiliated areas authorized by Congress. The largest affiliated area is New Jersey Pinelands National Reserve at 1,164,025 acres (4711 km^{2}). The smallest is Benjamin Franklin National Memorial at less than 0.01 acres (40 m^{2}).

While there are laws generally covering all units of the National Park System, they are subject to management policies of individual pieces of authorizing legislation or, in the case of national monuments created under the Antiquities Act, Executive Order. For example, because of provisions within their enabling legislation, Congaree National Park is almost entirely a wilderness area devoid of development, yet Yosemite allows unique developments such as the Badger Pass Ski Area and the O'Shaughnessy Dam within its boundaries. Such irregularities would not be found in other parks unless specifically provided for with exceptions by the legislation that created them.

=== Holdings ===
Type	Amount (2008)	
Area of land	84,000,000 acres	340,000 km^{2}
Area of oceans, lakes, reservoirs	4,502,644 acres	18,222 km^{2}
Length of perennial rivers and streams	85,049 mi	136,873 km
Archeological sites	68,561	
Length of shoreline	43,162 mi	69,463 km
Historic structures	27,000	
Objects in museum collections	121,603,193	
Buildings	21,000	
Trails	12,250 mi	19,710 km
Roads	8,500 mi	13,700 km

=== Criteria ===
Most NPS units have been established by an act of Congress, with the president confirming the action by signing the act into law. The exception, under the Antiquities Act, allows the president to designate and protect areas as national monuments by executive order. Regardless of the method used, all parks are to be of national importance.

A potential park should meet all four of the following standards:

- It is an outstanding example of a particular type of resource.
- It possesses exceptional value or quality in illustrating or interpreting the natural or cultural themes of the nation's heritage.
- It offers superlative opportunities for recreation, for public use and enjoyment, or for scientific study.
- It retains a high degree of integrity as a true, accurate, and relatively unspoiled example of the resource.

Before creation of a new unit, Congress typically directs the NPS to conduct a special resource study of a site to determine its national significance and suitability to be part of the National Park System.

=== Nomenclature ===
The NPS uses over 20 different titles for the park units it manages, including national park and national monument.

Classifications (2023)	Number (2024)	Area (2023)	Visitors (2023)
National Park	64	52,520,984.26 acres (212,545 km^{2})	92,390,204
National Monument	86	1,993,636.12 acres (8,068 km^{2})	13,786,614
National Lakeshore (3) and National Seashore (10)	13	810,799.10 acres (3,281 km^{2})	25,763,241
National Memorial	31	10,499.77 acres (42 km^{2})	41,152,084
National Preserve (19) and National Reserve (2)	21	24,617,971.50 acres (99,625 km^{2})	5,168,136
National Recreation Area	18	3,710,771.17 acres (15,017 km^{2})	51,443,904
National River (4) and National Wild and Scenic River (10)	14	696,717.08 acres (2,820 km^{2})	5,570,302
National Parkway	4	183,952.75 acres (744 km^{2})	32,316,093
National Historical Park (63), National Historic Site (76), and International Historic Site (1)	140	231,558.77 acres (937 km^{2})	35,738,635
National Military Park (9), National Battlefield Park (4), National Battlefield Site (1), and National Battlefield (11)	25	85,009.53 acres (344 km^{2})	8,568,423
National Scenic Trail	6	255,177.96 acres (1,033 km^{2})	Not available
Other Designations	11	38,889.24 acres (157 km^{2})	7,619,103
Totals	433	85,155,967.25 acres (344,614 km^{2})	319,516,739

National parks preserve nationally and globally significant scenic areas and nature reserves.

National monuments preserve a single unique cultural or natural feature. Devils Tower National Monument was the first in 1906. While the National Park Service holds the most national monuments, a monument may be managed or co-managed by a different entity such as the Bureau of Land Management or the Forest Service.

National preserves are for the protection of certain resources and operate similar to many National Parks, but allow limited resource extraction. Activities like hunting, fishing, and some mining may be allowed depending on the site. Big Cypress National Preserve and Big Thicket National Preserve were created in 1974 as the first national preserves.

National reserves are similar to national preserves, but the operational authority can be placed with a state or local government. New Jersey Pinelands National Reserve was the first to be established in 1978.

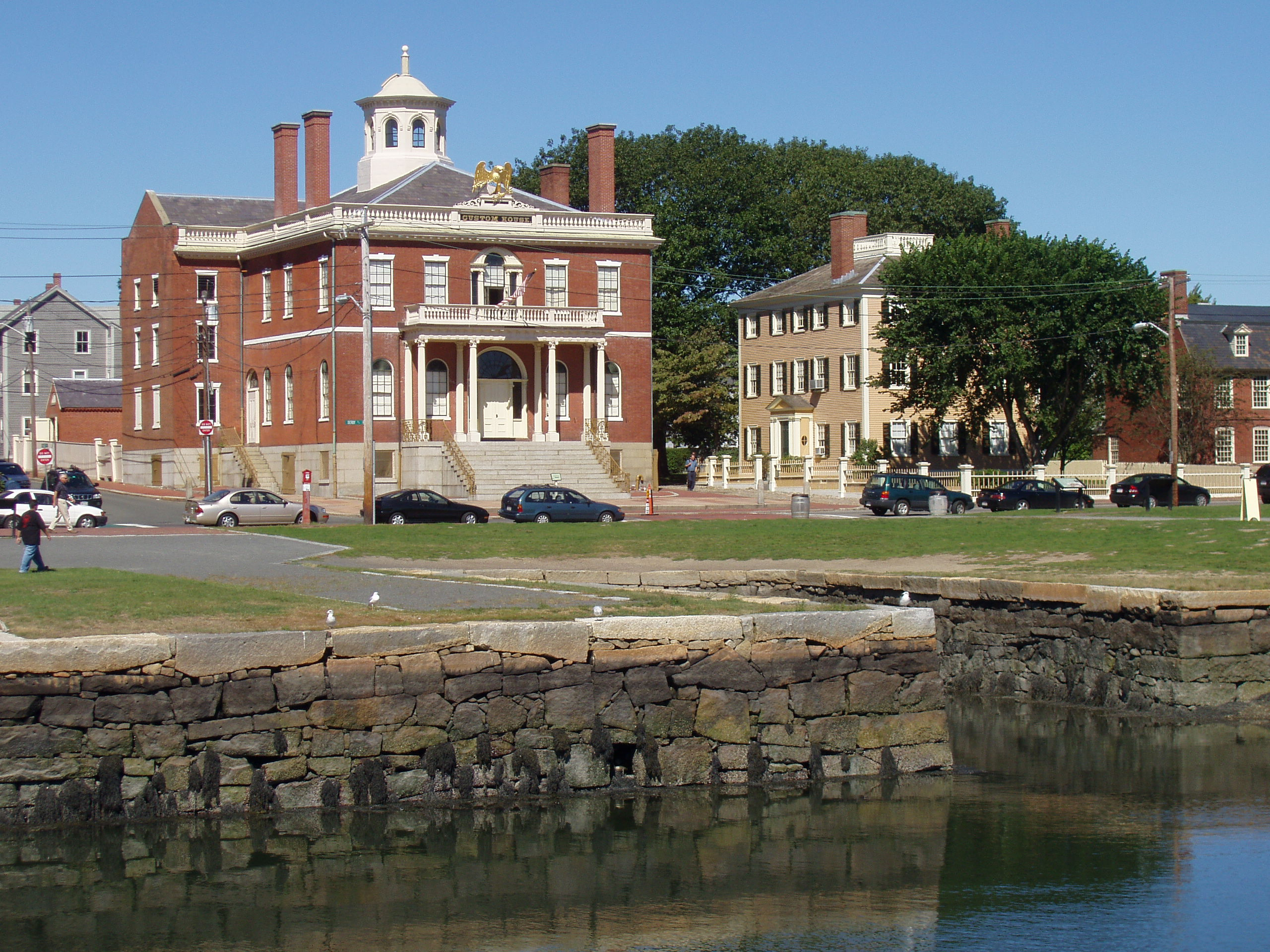
Customs House at the Salem Maritime National Historic Site in Salem, Massachusetts

National historic sites protect a significant cultural resource that is not a complicated site.

National historical parks are larger areas with more complex subjects. Historic sites may also be protected in other unit types.

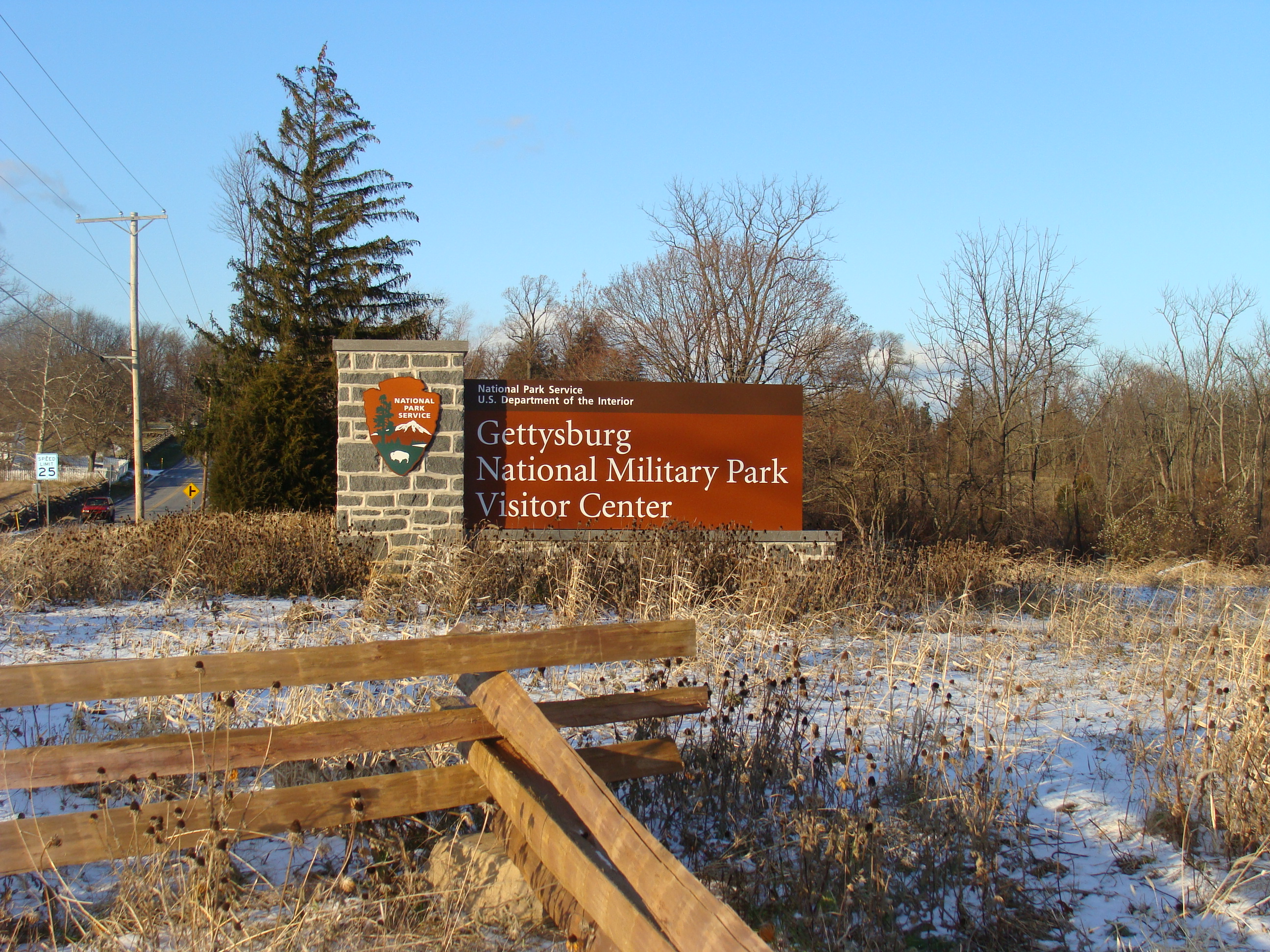
Winter at the Gettysburg Battlefield

National military parks, battlefield parks, battlefield sites, and battlefields preserve areas associated with military history. The different designations reflect the complexity of the event and the site. Many of the sites preserve important Revolutionary War battles and Civil War battlefields. Military parks are the sites of larger actions, such as Chickamauga and Chattanooga National Military Park, Vicksburg National Military Park, Gettysburg National Military Park, and Shiloh National Military Park—the original four from 1890.

Examples of battlefield parks, battlefield sites, and national battlefields include Richmond National Battlefield Park, Brices Cross Roads National Battlefield Site, and Antietam National Battlefield.

National memorials are areas that officially memorialize a person or event, though unlike a National Historical Site, may or may not be placed at a specific historical location. Several national memorials are on the National Mall, such as the Washington Monument and Lincoln Memorial.

National seashores and national lakeshores offer preservation of the national coast line, while supporting water–based recreation. Cape Hatteras National Seashore was created in 1937. Indiana Dunes National Lakeshore (now a National Park) and Pictured Rocks National Lakeshore, created in 1966, were the first national lakeshores.

National rivers and wild and scenic riverways protect free-flowing streams over their length. The riverways may not be altered with dams, channelization, or other changes. Recreational pursuits are encouraged along the waterways. Ozark National Scenic Riverways was established in 1964.

National recreation areas originally were units surrounding reservoirs impounded by dams built by other federal agencies, the first being Lake Mead National Recreation Area. Some national recreation areas are in urban centers, such as Gateway National Recreation Area and Golden Gate National Recreation Area, which encompass significant cultural as well as natural resources.

The National Trails System preserves long-distance routes across America. The system was created in 1968 and consists of two major components: National scenic trails are long-distance trails through some of the most scenic parts of the country. They received official protection in 1968. The Appalachian Trail is the best known. National historic trails commemorate the routes of major historic events. Some of the best known are the Trail of Tears, the Mormon Trail, and the Santa Fe Trail. These trails are administered by several federal agencies.

=== Special designations ===
Wilderness areas are part of the National Wilderness Preservation System, which consists of federally managed lands that are of a pristine condition, established by the Wilderness Act (Public Law 88-577) in 1964. The National Wilderness Preservation System originally created hundreds of wilderness zones within already protected federally administered property, consisting of over 9 million acres (36,000 km^{2}).

Marine Protected Areas (MPAs) began with Executive Order 13158 in May 2000, when official MPAs were established for the first time. The initial listing of U.S. areas was presented in 2010, consisting of areas already set aside under other legislation. The NPS has 19 park units designated as MPAs.

== Visitation ==
The National Park System received over 325 million recreation visits in 2023. Park visitation grew 64 percent between 1979 and 2015. In 2024, NPS reported a record 331.9 million recreation visits.

The 10 most-visited units of the National Park System handle around 30 percent of the overall visits. The top 10 percent of parks (43) handle over 64 percent of all visits, leaving the remaining more than 380 units to accommodate around 36 percent of visits. (Note that only 380 sites recorded visitors during 2021 due to COVID-19-related closures).

Park	Rank (2023)	Visits (2023)	Rank (2024)	Visits (2024)
Blue Ridge Parkway (Note: When Hurricane Helene hit the area September 27–29, 2024, the Blue Ridge Parkway received major damage and was closed during peak tourist season. Repairs were ongoing in February 2025.)	1	16,757,635	2	16,733,639
Golden Gate National Recreation Area	2	14,953,882	1	17,187,508
Great Smoky Mountains National Park (Note: Parts of Great Smoky Mountains National Park closed after Hurricane Helene hit the area in September 2024 and remained closed as of January 2025.)	3	13,297,647	3	12,191,834
Gateway National Recreation Area	4	8,705,329	4	8,929,035
Gulf Islands National Seashore	5	8,277,857	6	7,801,176
Lincoln Memorial	6	8,099,148	5	8,479,349
George Washington Memorial Parkway	7	7,391,260	8	6,782,717
Natchez Trace Parkway	8	6,784,853	7	7,364,833
Lake Mead National Recreation Area	9	5,798,541	9	6,412,854
Glen Canyon National Recreation Area	10	5,206,934	15	4,725,610
Vietnam Veterans Memorial	11	5,039,454	10	5,295,711

=== Entrance fees ===
Most areas of the National Park System do not charge entrance fees and are completely supported by tax dollars, although some of the most popular areas do charge entrance fees. Fees vary site to site and are charged either on a per-vehicle or per-person basis, with most passes valid for 7 days. The America the Beautiful Pass series waives the per-vehicle fee or per-person fee for the holder and up to 3 other adults (children age 15 and younger are admitted for free at most sites). Annual passes for single areas are also available for those who visit the same site often.

=== Overnight stays ===
Over 15 million visitors spent a night in one of the national park units during 2015. The largest number (3.68 million) were tent campers. The second-largest group (3.38 million) stayed in one of the lodges, followed by miscellaneous stays (on boats, group sites—2.15 million). The last three groups of over-night visitors included RV campers (2.26 million), backcountry campers (2.02 million) and users of the concession-run campgrounds (1.42 million).

== Budget ==
In 2019, the NPS had an annual budget of $4.085 billion and an estimated $12 billion maintenance backlog. On August 4, 2020, the Great American Outdoors Act was signed into law reducing the $12 billion maintenance backlog by $9.5 billion over a 5-year period beginning in FY 2021. As of 2022, the NPS had the largest budget allocation of any Department of the Interior bureau or program.

The NPS budget is divided into two primary areas, discretionary and mandatory spending. Within each of these areas, there are numerous specific purposes to which Congress directs the services activities.

The NPS budget includes discretionary spending which is broken out into two portions: the direct operations of the National Parks and the special initiatives. Listed separately are the special initiatives of the service for the year specified in the legislation. During fiscal year 2010, the service was charged with five initiatives. They include: stewardship and education; professional excellence; youth programs; climate change impacts; and budget restructure and realignment.

=== Discretionary spending ===
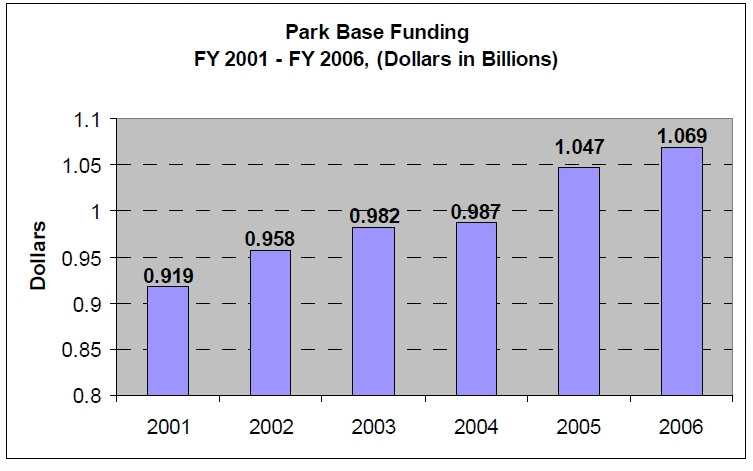
NPS Operations of the National Parks budget from FY 2001-FY 2006

Discretionary spending includes the Operations of the National Parks (ONPS), from which all park operations are paid. The United States Park Police funds cover the high-profile law enforcement operations at some of the large parks, including Gateway National Recreation Area, Golden Gate National Recreation Area, and the National Mall. The National Recreation and Preservation Program and the Urban Park and Recreation Fund are outreach programs to support state and local outdoor recreational activities.

The ONPS section of the budget is divided into six operational areas. These areas include:

==== Resource stewardship ====
These are funds and people directed towards the restoration, preservation, and maintenance of natural and cultural resources. The resource staff includes biologists, geologists, archeologists, museum curators, preservation specialists, and a variety of specialized employees to restore and preserve cultural buildings or natural features.

==== Visitor services ====
The NPS allocates funds obtained from its visitor services for use in public programs and for educational programs for the general public and school groups. Park rangers trained in providing walks, talks, and educational programs to the public frequently conduct such programs. Media specialists prepare exhibits along trails, roads and in visitor contact facilities, as well as written brochures and web-sites.

==== Park protection ====
This includes the staff responding to visitor emergencies (criminal, medical, search and rescue), and the protection of the park's natural and cultural resources from damage by those persons visiting the park. The staff includes law enforcement rangers, park police, lifeguards, criminal investigators, and communication center operators. In many instances they also work with state and territorial fish and wildlife management agency rangers.

==== Facility maintenance and operations ====
This is the cost of maintaining the necessary infrastructure within each park that supports all the services provided. It includes the plows and heavy equipment for road clearing, repairs and construction. There are buildings, trails, roads, docks, boats, utility pipes and wires, and a variety of hidden systems that make a park accessible by the public. The staff includes equipment operators, custodians, trail crews, electricians, plumbers, engineers, architects, and other building trade specialists.

==== Park support ====
This is the staff that provides for the routine logistical needs of the parks. There are human resource specialists, contracting officers, property specialists, budget managers, accountants and information technology specialists.

==== External administrative costs ====
The NPS pays external administrative costs to outside organizations that provide the logistical support that the NPS needs to operate its facilities. These costs include rent payments to the General Services Administration for building space, postage payments to the postal machine vendor and other direct payments.

Functional area	FY 2010 (in thousands)	% of total
Resource stewardship	$347,328	15.3%
Visitor services	$247,386	10.9%
Park protection	$368,698	16.3%
Facility maintenance and operations	$705,220	31.1%
Park support	$441,854	19.5%
External administrative costs	$155,530	6.9%
Total (2010)	$2,266,016	

=== Land and Water Conservation Fund ===
The Land and Water Conservation Fund (LWCF) supports Land Acquisition and State Conservation Assistance (SCA) grant programs. In 2010, the LWCF began an incremental process to fully fund its programs at a total cost of $900 million. The Department of the Interior and the United States Forest Service use these funds to purchase critical lands to protect existing public lands.

The LWCF also issues grants to States and local jurisdictions to preserve and protect Civil War battlefield sites that are not part of the national park system. The SCA program distributes funds for land preservation to individual states.

=== Historic Preservation Fund ===
The National Historic Preservation Act of 1966 set the federal vision for historic preservation in the United States. To support the vision and framework laid out in this act, the Historic Preservation Fund (HPF) was established in 1977 to provide financial assistance to, originally, states, to carry out activities related to preservation. Funding is provided from Outer Continental Shelf oil and gas lease revenues, not tax dollars, and an amount is appropriated annually by Congress. Awards from the HPF are made to States, Tribes, Territories, local governments, and non-profits. Two specific programs include the Save America's Treasures and the Preserve America. The Historic Preservation Offices makes grants available to the States, territories, and tribal lands. To honor the 250th anniversary of the United States, Congress authorized the Semiquincentennial Grant in 2020 to support the preservation of State owned sites and structures listed on the National Register of Historic Places that commemorate the founding of the nation.

=== Economic benefits ===
The NPS affects economies at national, state, and local levels. According to a 2011 Michigan State University report prepared for the NPS, for each $1 invested in the NPS, the American public receives $4 in economic value. In 2011, national parks generated $30.1 billion in economic activity and 252,000 jobs nationwide. Thirteen billion of that amount went directly into communities within 60 miles of a NPS unit.

In a 2017 study, the NPS found that 331 million park visitors spent $18.2 billion in local areas around National Parks across the nation. This spending helped support 306,000 jobs. The NPS expenditures supported $297 million in economic output in Missouri alone.

== Concessions ==
In an effort to increase visitation and allow for a larger audience to enjoy national park land, the NPS has numerous concession contracts with private businesses to bring recreation, resorts and other compatible amenities to their parks. NPS lodging opportunities exist at places such as the Wawona Hotel in Yosemite National Park and the Fort Baker Retreat and Conference Center in Golden Gate National Recreation Area.

- Delaware North Corporation at Yosemite National Park, Yellowstone National Park, South Rim Grand Canyon National Park.
- Forever Resorts at Big Bend National Park, Blue Ridge Parkway, Badlands National Park, North Rim of Grand Canyon National Park, Olympic National Park, Lake Mead National Recreation Area, Mammoth Cave National Park, Isle Royale National Park, and Rocky Mountain National Park.
- Xanterra Parks & Resorts at Bryce Canyon National Park, Crater Lake National Park, Death Valley National Park, South Rim Grand Canyon National Park, Mount Rushmore National Memorial, Painted Desert at Petrified Forest National Park, Yellowstone National Park, and Zion National Park.

=== Litigation with Delaware North ===
In 2015, Delaware North sued the NPS in the United States Court of Federal Claims for breach of contract, alleging that the NPS had undervalued its trademarks of the names of iconic Yosemite National Park concession facilities. The NPS estimated the value of the intangible assets including the names "Ahwahnee", "Badger Pass", "Curry Village", and "Yosemite Lodge" at $3.5 million. Delaware North lost the contract, and asserted that the historic names were worth $51 million and maintained that the incoming concessioner had to be paid that amount.

The Justice Department and the NPS asserted that this was an "improper and wildly inflated" value. Rather than pay Delaware North's demanded valuation, in January 2016 the NPS instead opted to rename the famous landmarks, effective in March. The Ahwahnee Hotel is slated to become The Majestic Yosemite Hotel, Curry Village will become Half Dome Village, and the Wawona Hotel will become Big Trees Lodge. Widespread public outcry focused on Delaware North's decision to claim ownership of names within a national park. The names were restored in 2019 upon settlement of the dispute.

== Offices ==
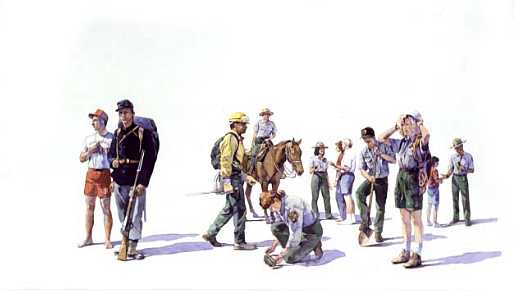
Depicts twelve figures, most in NPS uniforms, shown in occupations from left to right: a lifeguard, a Civil War reenactor, fire management, mounted patrol, researcher and/or natural resources with fish, a female ranger with two visitors, a laborer, a climber/rescuer, and a youth with a male ranger.

The national headquarters is located in the Main Interior Building, 1849 C Street NW, several blocks southwest of the White House. The central office is composed of eleven directorates: director/deputy directors; business services; workforce management; chief information officer; cultural resources; natural resource stewardship and science; office of the comptroller; park planning, facilities and lands; partnerships and visitor experience; visitor and resource protection; and the United States Park Police.

Regional offices are in Anchorage, Atlanta, Lakewood, CO (Denver), Omaha, NE, Philadelphia, San Francisco and Seattle. The headquarters building of the National Park Service Southwest Regional Office is architecturally significant and is designated a National Historic Landmark.

The NPS is an operating unit of the U.S. Department of the Interior. The NPS director is nominated by the president of the United States and confirmed by the United States Senate. The director is supported by six senior executives.

These executives manage national programs, policy, and budget from the Washington, DC, headquarters. Under the deputy director of operations are seven regional directors, who are responsible for national park management and program implementation. Together this group is called the National Leadership Council.

== Staff and volunteers ==
=== Directors ===
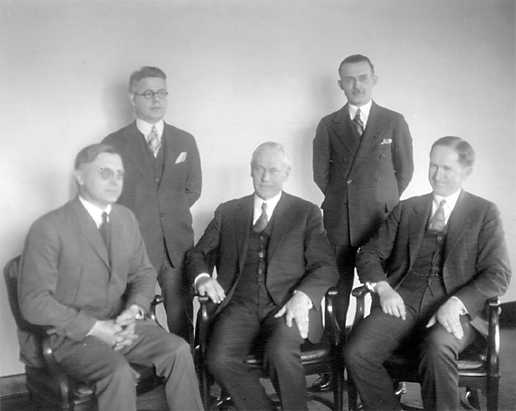
Stephen Mather (center) and his staff, 1927 or 1928

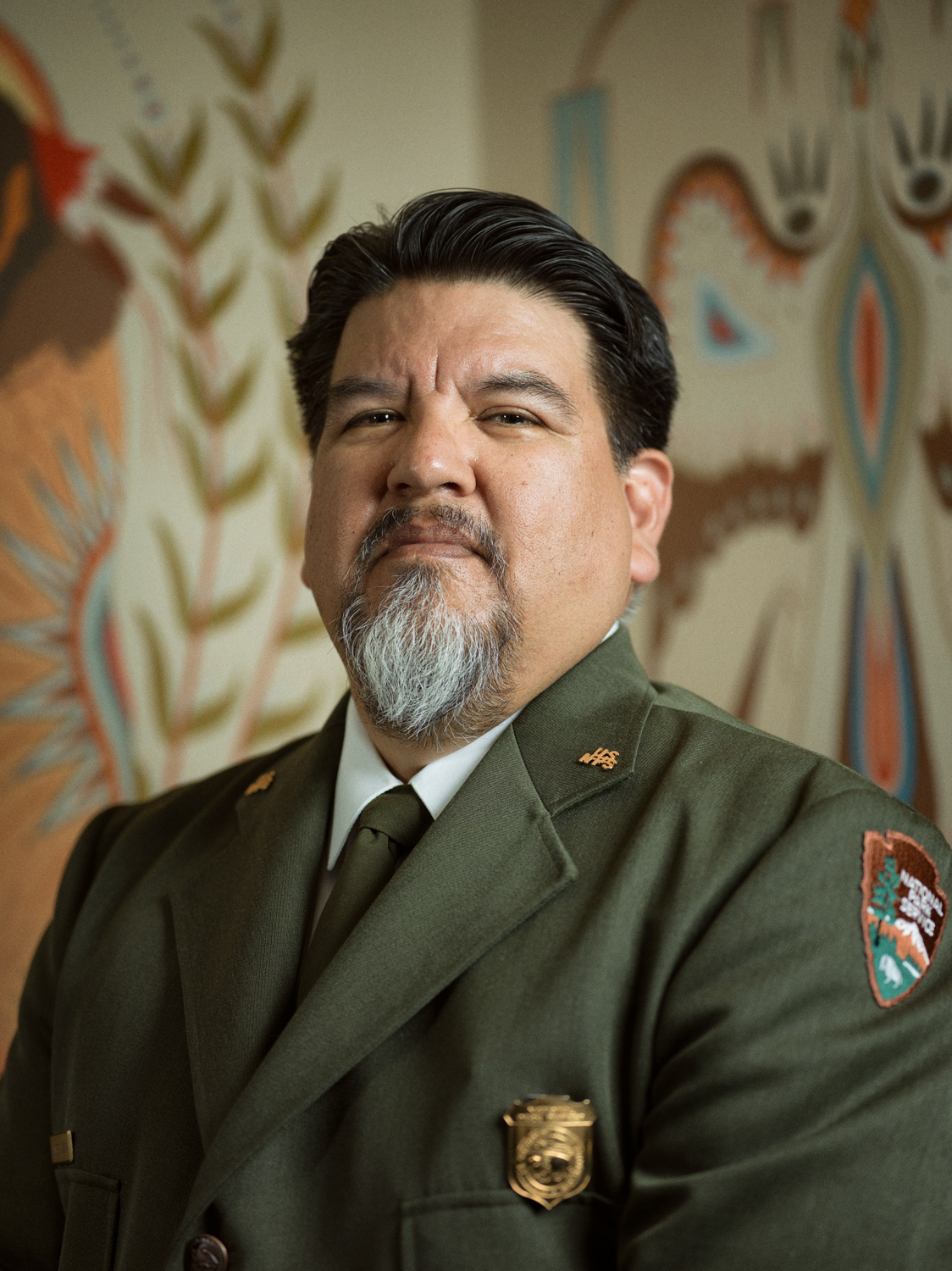
Chuck Sams, NPS Director from 2021 to 2025

=== Employees ===
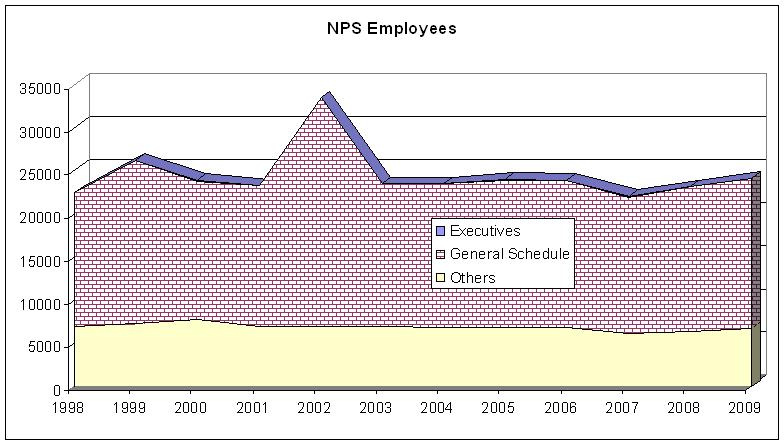
National Park Service employment levels. Executives: abt 27; Gen Sch: 16–17,000; Others: 6–7,000

By the mid-1950s, the primary employees of the service were the park rangers, who had broad responsibilities on the parks' behalf. They cleaned up trash, operated heavy equipment, fought fires, managed traffic, cleared trails and roads, provided information to visitors, managed museums, performed rescues, flew aircraft, and investigated crime.

The NPS employs many kinds of workers:

- National Park Service Ranger
  - Interpreter
  - Law enforcement
- Park management (Superintendent/Deputy)
- United States Park Police
- Emergency management (Emergency medical providers, search and rescue specialists)
  - Lifeguards
- Dispatchers
- Maintenance (including carpenters, plumbers, masons, laborers, auto mechanics, motor vehicle operators, heavy equipment operators, electricians)
- Park planning
  - Architects, engineers, and landscape architects
- Resource management (including archeologist, biologist, botanist, aquatics, soil scientist, geologist)
- History (curators, historians, preservation technicians, historic architects, archivists)
- Fire management (managers, weather specialist, firefighters, engine captains, crew superintendents, battalion chiefs)
- Public affairs
- Administration (human resources, finance, accountants, information technology, budgeting, concessions management)

Locations are varied. Parks exist in the nation's larger cities like New York City (Federal Hall Memorial National Historic Site), Atlanta (Martin Luther King, Jr. National Historic Site), and San Diego (Cabrillo National Monument) to some of the remotest areas of the continent like Hovenweep National Monument in southeastern Utah, to Aniakchak National Monument in King Salmon, Alaska.

In February 2025, in an effort to decrease federal spending, over 1,000 NPS employees were fired; leaving many sites understaffed.

=== Volunteers-In-Parks (VIP) ===
The Volunteers-In-Parks program was authorized in 1969 by the Volunteers in the Parks Act of 1969. for the purpose of allowing the public to serve in the nations parks providing support and skills for their enhancement and protection.

Volunteers come from all walks of life and include professionals, artists, laborers, homemakers and students, performing varied duties. Many come from surrounding communities and some travel significant distances. In a 2005 annual report, the NPS reported that,

...137,000 VIPs contributed 5.2 million hours of service (or 2500 FTEs) valued at $91,260,000 based on the private sector value figure of $17.55 as used by AARP, Points of Light Foundation, and other large-scale volunteer programs including many federal agencies. There are 365 separate volunteer programs throughout the NPS. Since 1990, the number of volunteers has increased an average of 2% per year.

FTE stands for full-time equivalent (one work year). In 2012, the National Park Service reported that over 221,000 volunteers contributed about 6.4 million hours annually.

Additionally, other types of volunteers also conduct offsite NPS public outreach and education, such as the Trails & Rails program guides on board certain segments of long-haul Amtrak routes, who offer passengers insights to the travel area's natural resources and heritage.

=== Artist-In-Residence ===
Across the nation, there are special opportunities for artists (visual artists, photographers, sculptors, performers, writers, composers, and crafts) to live and work in a park. Twenty-nine parks currently participate in the Artist-In-Residence program.

=== United States Park Rangers ===
National Park Service rangers are among the uniformed employees charged with protecting and preserving areas set aside in the National Park System by the United States Congress and the President of the United States. While all employees of the agency contribute to the National Park Service mission of preserving unimpaired the natural and cultural resources set aside by the American people for future generations, the term "park ranger" is traditionally used to describe all National Park Service employees who wear the uniform. Broadly speaking, all National Park Service rangers promote stewardship of the resources in their care—either voluntary stewardship via resource interpretation, or compliance with statute or regulation through law enforcement. These comprise the two main disciplines of the ranger profession in the National Park Service.

Law enforcement rangers, or protection rangers, are uniformed federal law enforcement officers with broad authority to enforce federal and state laws within NPS sites. The NPS commonly refers to law enforcement operations in the agency as visitor and resource protection.

In most NPS units, law enforcement rangers are the primary police agency. The NPS also employs special agents who conduct more complex criminal investigations. Rangers and agents receive extensive police training at the Federal Law Enforcement Training Center and annual in-service and regular firearms training.

=== United States Park Police ===
The United States Park Police (USPP) is the oldest uniformed federal law enforcement agency in the United States. It functions as a full service law enforcement agency with responsibilities and jurisdiction in those NPS areas primarily located in the Washington, D.C. Parks, San Francisco, and New York City Parks areas.

In addition to performing the normal crime prevention, investigation, and apprehension functions of an urban police force, the park police are responsible for policing many of the famous monuments in the United States and share law enforcement jurisdiction in all lands administered by the service with a force of national park rangers tasked with the same law enforcement powers and responsibilities.

=== Youth programs ===
The NPS partners with a variety of youth oriented programs. The oldest serving group is the Student Conservation Association (SCA). It was established in 1957, committed to conservation and preservation. The SCA's goal is to create the next generation of conservation leaders.

SCA volunteers work through internships, conservation jobs, and crew experiences. Volunteers conduct resource management, historic preservation, cultural resources and conservation programs to gain experience, which can lead to career development and further educational opportunities. The SCA places volunteers in more than 350 national park units and NPS offices each year.

The Corps Network, formerly known as the National Association for Service and Corps (NASCC), represents 136 Service and Conservation Corps. These groups have programs in 42 states and the District of Columbia. Corpsmembers are between the ages of 16–25. Service and Conservation Corps are direct descendants of the Civilian Conservation Corps (CCC) of the 1930s that built park facilities in the national parks and other public parks around the country. The Corps Network was established in 1985.

- The Youth Conservation Corps (ages 15–18) brings young people into a park to restore, preserve and protect a natural, cultural, or historical resources. Enrollees are paid for their work.
- Public Land Corps (ages 16–25) is a job helping to restore, protect, and rehabilitate a local national parks. The enrollees learn about environmental issues and the parks.

== Special divisions ==
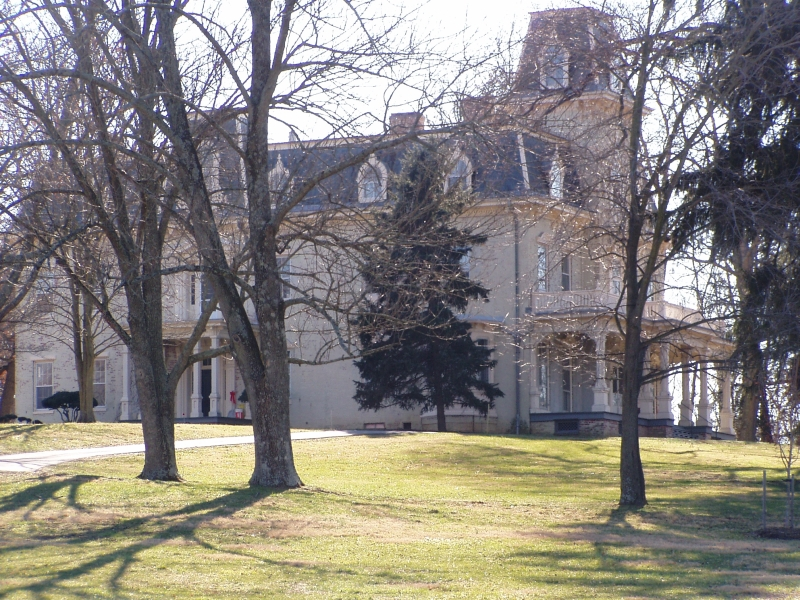
Historic Preservation Training Center

Other special NPS divisions include the Archeology Program, Historic American Buildings Survey, National Register of Historic Places, National Natural Landmarks, the Rivers, Trails and Conservation Assistance Program, the Challenge Cost Share Program, the Federal Lands to Parks, the Hydropower Relicensing Program, the Land and Water Conservation Fund, the National Trails System, the Partnership Wild and Scenic Rivers Program, Natural Sounds and Night Skies Division., and the Historic Preservation Training Center (HPTC).

There is also an Investigative Services Branch (ISB), based at NPS headquarters in Washington, D.C. which has personnel distributed among the parks.

=== Centers ===
The NPS operates four archaeology-related centers: Harpers Ferry Center, in Harpers Ferry, West Virginia; the Midwest Archeological Center, in Lincoln, Nebraska; the Southeast Archeological Center, in Tallahassee, Florida; and the Western Archeological and Conservation Center, in Tucson, Arizona. The Harpers Ferry Center specializes in developing interpretive media and in conserving objects. The others focus to various degrees on archaeological research and the curation and conservation of museum objects.

National Park Service training centers include the Horace Albright Training Center, Grand Canyon; the Stephen Mather Training Center, Harpers Ferry, West Virginia; the Historic Preservation Training Center, Frederick, Maryland; and the Capital Training Center, Washington, D.C.

The Submerged Resources Center catalogues and evaluates submerged resources in the National Park system. The SRC's headquarters are at the Intermountain Region's headquarters, in Lakewood, Colorado.

The National Center for Preservation Technology and Training, in Natchitoches, Louisiana, conducts research and training in archaeology, architecture, landscape architecture, and materials conservation.

=== Preservation Programs ===
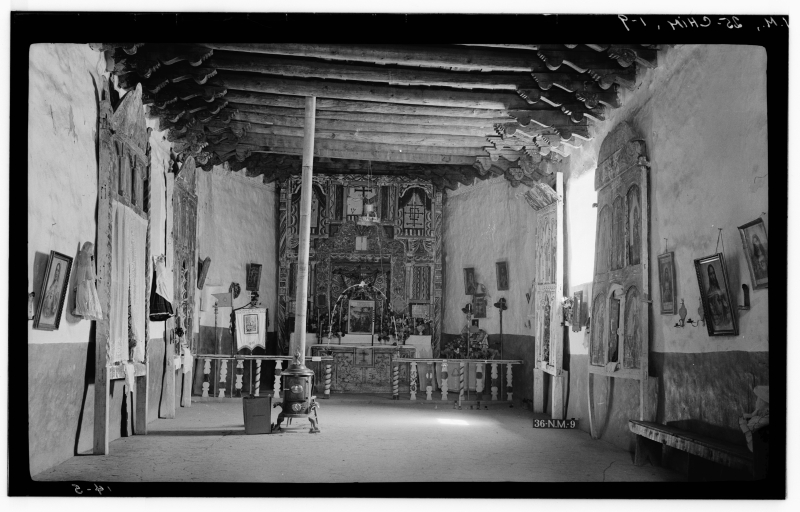
Photograph of El Santuario Del Señor Esquipula, Chimayo, New Mexico

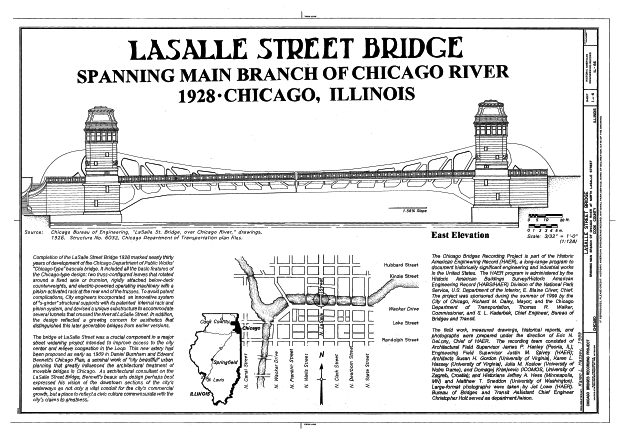
LaSalle Street Bridge, Chicago, Illinois

The oldest federal preservation program, the Historic American Buildings Survey/Historic American Engineering Record (HABS/HAER), produces graphic and written documentation of historically significant architectural, engineering and industrial sites and structures. Dating from 1934, the Historic American Buildings Survey (HABS) was chartered to document historic architecture—primarily houses and public buildings—of national or regional significance. Originally a New Deal employment/preservation program, after World War II, HABS employed summer teams of advanced undergraduate and graduate students to carry out the documentation, a tradition followed to this day. Many of the structures they documented no longer exist.

HABS/HAER produces measured drawings, large-format photographs and written histories of historic sites, structures and objects, that are significant to the architectural, engineering and industrial heritage of the U.S. Its 25,000 records are part of the Library of Congress. HABS/HAER is administered by the NPS Washington office and five regional offices.

==== Historic American Buildings Survey ====
In 1933, the NPS established the Historic American Buildings Survey (HABS), based on a proposal by Charles E. Peterson, Park Service landscape architect. It was founded as a make-work program for architects, draftsmen and photographers left jobless by the Great Depression. Guided by field instructions from Washington, D.C., the first recorders were tasked with documenting a representative sampling of America's architectural heritage. After 70 years, there is now an archive of historic architecture. HABS provided a database of primary source material for the then fledgling historic preservation movement.

==== Historic American Engineering Record ====
Recognizing a similar fragility in the national industrial and engineering heritage, the NPS, the Library of Congress and the American Society of Civil Engineers (ASCE) formed the HAER program in 1969, to document nationally and regionally significant engineering and industrial sites. Later, HAER was ratified by the American Society of Mechanical Engineers (ASME), the Institute of Electrical and Electronics Engineers (IEEE), the American Institute of Chemical Engineers (AIChE) and the American Institute of Mining, Metallurgical and Petroleum Engineers (AIME). HAER documentation, in the forms of measured and interpretive drawings, large-format photographs and written histories, is archivally preserved in the Prints and Photographs Division of the Library of Congress, where it is readily available to the public.

Historic American Landscapes Survey

With the growing vitality of landscape history, preservation and management, proper recognition for historic American landscape documentation must be addressed. In response to this need, the American Society of Landscape Architects Historic Preservation Professional Interest Group worked with the National Park Service to establish a national program. Hence, in October 2000 the National Park Service permanently established the Historic American Landscapes Survey (HALS) program for the systematic documentation of historic American landscapes.

==== Rivers, Trails and Conservation Assistance Program ====
The NPS Rivers, Trails and Conservation Assistance (NPS-RTCA) program is designed to assist local communities and the public with planning for conservation and outdoor recreation projects. The NPS-RTCA program is able to work with local communities outside the borders of the nation's National Parks because of the second sentence of the NPS Mission Statement. Unlike the mainline National Park Programs, these programs take place on non-federal property at the request of the local community. One of their better known programs is Rails to Trails, where unused railroad right-of-ways are converted into public hiking and biking trails.

==== Japanese American Confinement Sites ====
The National Park Service is responsible for the management and upkeep of several sites where Americans of Japanese descent were forcibly relocated and incarcerated Japanese Americans during World War II between 1942 and 1946 under the order of President Franklin D. Roosevelt. The Japanese American Confinement Sites (JACS) grant program provides funding for applicants that preserve these sites and their memory.

=== National Trails System ===
The National Trails System is a joint mission of the NPS, the Bureau of Land Management and the US Forest Service. It was created in 1968 to establish a system of long-distance National Scenic and National Historic Trails, as well as to recognize existing trails in the states as National Recreation Trails. Several additional trails have been established since 1968, and in 2009 Congress established the first National Geologic Trail.

=== National Heritage Areas ===
National Heritage Areas are a unique blend of natural, cultural, historic, and scenic resources. These are not considered units of the NPS, as they are maintained by state/territorial governments or non-profit organizations (described as local coordinating entities). The National Park Service provides an advisory role and limited technical, planning and financial assistance. Designation of National Heritage Areas is done by an Act of Congress. As of 2021 there are 55 designated heritage areas, some of which cross state lines.

== Initiatives ==
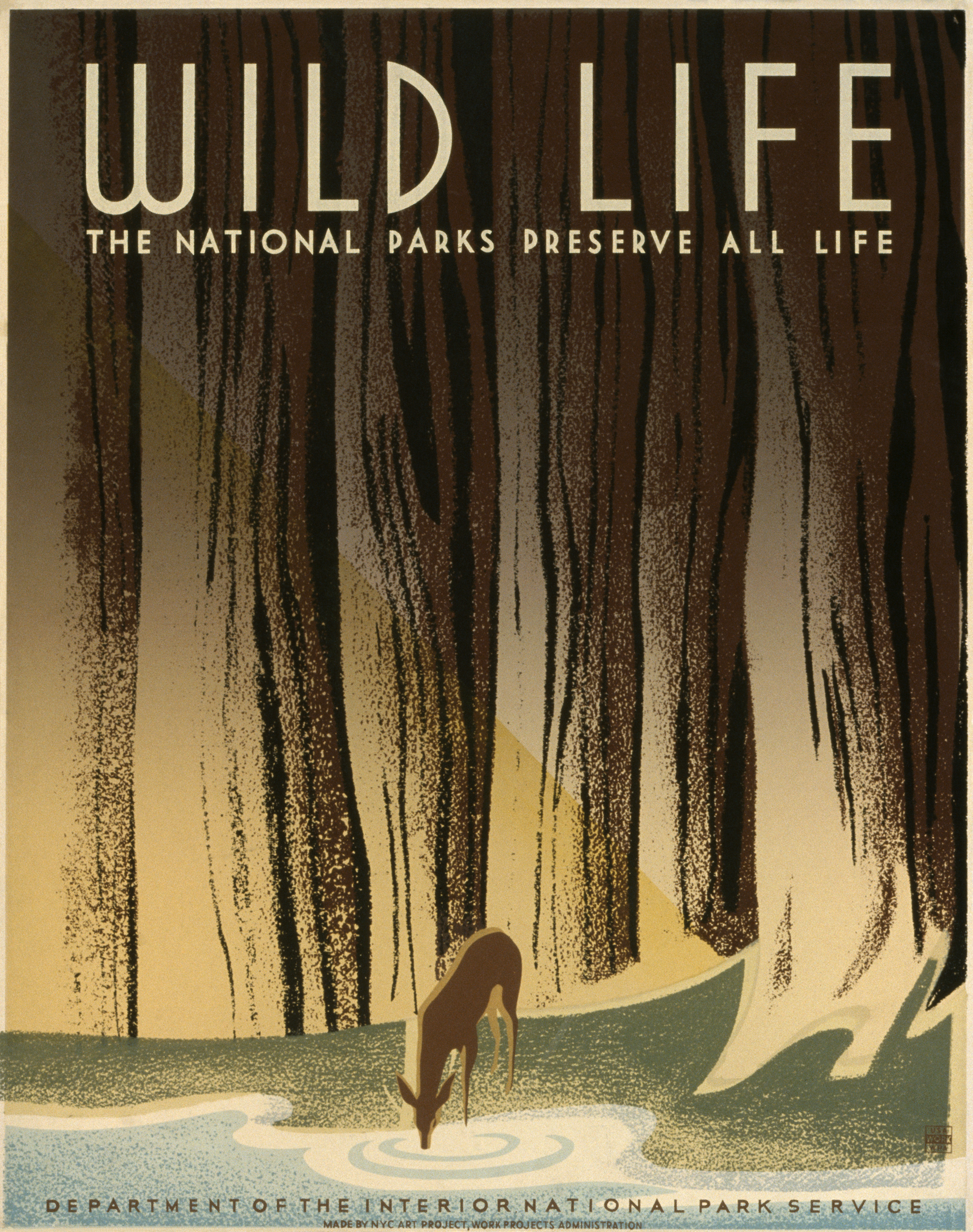
"The national parks preserve all life", poster for National Park Service, 1940

- 24-hr all Taxa BioBlitz: A joint venture of the National Geographic Society and the NPS. Beginning in 2004, at Rock Creek Parkway, the National Geographic Society and the NPS began a 10-year program of hosting a major biological survey of ten selected national park units. The intent is to develop public interest in the nation's natural resources, develop scientific interest in America's youth and to create citizen scientists.
  - 2007: Rock Creek Park, Washington D.C. 661 species
  - 2008: Santa Monica Mountains National Recreation Area, Los Angeles, California. 1,700 species and more pending.
  - 2009: Indiana Dunes National Lakeshore, near Chicago in northern Indiana. 1,716 species and still counting.
  - 2010: Biscayne National Park, Miami, Florida. 810 species were identified during this 24-hr event. As classification continues, more species will be added to the list.
  - 2011: Saguaro National Park, Tucson, Arizona. During the 24 hours, 859 different species were identified, of which more than 400 were previously unknown in the park.
  - 2012: Rocky Mountain National Park, in Estes Park, In August 2012 489 species were identified.
  - 2013: Jean Lafitte National Historical Park and Preserve, in New Orleans. May 17–18, 2013 in the park's Barataria Preserve.
  - 2014: Golden Gate National Recreation Area
  - 2015: Hawai'i Volcanoes National Park
  - 2016: Whiskeytown National Recreation Area, Cabrillo National Monument, Channel Islands National Park, Washington, D.C.
  - 2017: Virgin Islands National Park
- Biological Diversity: Biological Diversity is the vast variety of life as identified through species and genetics. This variety is decreasing as people spread across the globe, altering areas to better meet their needs.
- Climate Change: Warming of the climate system is unequivocal, as is now evident from observations of increases in global average air and ocean temperatures, widespread melting of snow and ice, and rising global sea levels. (Intergovernmental Panel on Climate Change, 2007).
- South Florida Restoration Initiative: Rescuing an Ecosystem in Peril: In partnership with the State of Florida, and the Army Corps of Engineers, the NPS is restoring the physical and biological processes of the South Florida ecosystem. Historically, this ecosystem contained some of the most diverse habitats on earth.
- Vanishing Treasures Initiative: Ruins Preservation in the American Southwest: The Vanishing Treasures Initiative began in FY 1998 to reduce threats to prehistoric and historic sites and structures in 44 parks of the Intermountain Region. In 2002, the program expanded to include three parks in the Pacific West Region. The goal is to reduce backlogged work and to bring sites and structures up to a condition where routine maintenance activities can preserve them.
- Wetlands: Wetlands includes marshes, swamps, and bogs. These areas and the plants and animals adapted to these conditions spread from the arctic to the equator. The shrinking wetlands provide habitat for fish and wildlife, help clean water and reduce the impact of storms and floods on the surrounding communities.
- Wildland Fire: Fires have been a natural part of park eco-systems. Many plants and some animals require a cycle of fire or flooding to be successful and productive. With the advent of human intervention and public access to parks, there are safety concerns for the visiting public.

=== Green Park Plan ===
In September 2010, the NPS released its Climate Change Response Strategy, followed in April 2012 by the Green Parks Plan.

==== Climate Friendly Parks Program ====
The Climate Friendly Parks Program is a subset of the Green Parks Plan. It was created in collaboration between the NPS and the US Environmental Protection Agency. The program is meant to measure and reduce greenhouse gases to help slow the effects of climate change.

Parks in the CFP program create and implement plans to reduce greenhouse gases through reducing energy and water use. Facilities are designed and retrofitted using sustainable materials. Alternative transportation systems are developed to reduce dependency on fossil fuels. Parks in the program offer public education programs about how the parks are already affected.

The CFP program provides climate-friendly solutions to the visiting public, like using clean energy, reducing waste, and making smart transportation choices. The CFP program can provide technical assistance, tools and resources for the parks and their neighboring communities to protect the natural and cultural resources.

The large, isolated parks typically generate their own electricity and heat and must do so without spoiling the values that the visitors have come to experience. Pollution is emitted by the vehicles used to transport visitors around the often-vast expanses of the parks. Many parks have converted vehicles to electric hybrids, and substitute diesel/electric hybrid buses for private automobiles. In 2001 it was estimated that replacement with electric vehicles would eliminate 25 TPY emissions entirely.

In 2010, the NPS estimated that reducing bottled water could eliminate 6,000 tons of carbon emissions and 8 million kilowatt-hours of electricity every year. The NPS Concessions office voiced concerns about concessions impacts.

By 2014, 23 parks had banned disposable water bottles. In 2015, the International Bottled Water Association stated the NPS was "leaving sugary drinks as a primary alternative", even though the Park Service provides water stations to refill bottles, "encouraging visitors to hydrate for free". The Water Association made the national parks one of its top lobbying targets. In July 2015 Rep. Keith Rothfus added a "last-minute" amendment into Congress's appropriations bill, blocking the NPS from funding or enforcing the program. The NPS discontinued its ban on disposable water bottles in August 2017.

=== Cashless ===
In an effort to save on cash processing and hand handling fees, 22 national parks have gone cashless as of 2023. In September 2023, US Senator Cynthia Lummis (R-WY) proposed the "Protecting Access to Recreation with Cash Act" (PARC) which would require national parks to accept cash as a form of payment for entrance fee. In April 2024, several NPS visitors sued seeking to restore cash as a payment form noting how cash is legal tender suitable "for all public charges" and that the "additional processing fees that will be borne by NPS and by visitors who ultimately fund the federal government through taxes, in addition to personal surcharges and bank fees visitors may incur under NPS cashless policy."

== Related acts ==
- Alaska National Interest Lands Conservation Act of 1980
- Antiquities Act or Lacy Act of 1906
- Consolidated Natural Resources Act of 2008
- Endangered Species Act of 1973
- Endangered Species Act Amendments of 1978
- Fish and Wildlife Coordination Act of 1934
- Great American Outdoors Act of 2020
- Historic Sites Act of 1935
- Lacey Act of 1900 (Wildlife preservation)
- Marine Mammal Protection Act of 1972
- National Environmental Policy Act of 1970 (NEPA)
- National Historic Preservation Act of 1966 (NHPA)
- National Park Service General Authorities Act of 1970
- National Park Service Organic Act of 1916
- National Wild and Scenic River of 1968
- Redwood Act of 1978, creating one protection standard for the System
- Resource Conservation and Recovery Act of 1976
- Wilderness Act of 1964

== See also ==
=== People ===
==== Individuals ====
- Ansel Franklin Hall, first Chief Naturalist and first Chief Forester of the NPS
- William Kent (U.S. Congressman), donated early parklands to the government
- John F. Lacey, congressman from Iowa
- Harry Yount, progenitor of the modern national park ranger

==== Roles ====
- National Park People
- National Park Ranger

=== Related organizations ===
- National Park Foundation
- National Parks Conservation Association (NPCA)

=== Other links ===
- Alt National Park Service
- Land and Water Conservation Fund
- National Park Passport Stamps
- National Park Service Rustic, style of architecture
- National Park Service uniforms
- National Park Travelers Club
- National Park to Park Highway
- US Parks Police
- United States Senate Committee on Forest Reservations and the Protection of Game
- Wilderness preservation systems in the United States
- List of World Heritage Sites in the United States

== Sources ==
- Albright, Horace M. (as told to Robert Cahn). The Birth of the National Park Service. Salt Lake City: Howe Brothers, 1985.
- Albright, Horace M, and Marian Albright Schenck. Creating the National Park Service: The Missing Years. Norman: University of Oklahoma Press, 1999.
- Berkowitz, Paul D. (2017). The Ranger Image and Noble Cause Corruption in the National Park Service. Walterville Oregon: Trine Day Publishing. ISBN 978-1-63424-126-7.
- Berkowitz, Paul D., The Case of the Indian Trader, University of New Mexico Press ISBN 978-0-8263-4860-9, ISBN 978-0-8263-4859-3, 2011.
- Dilsaver, Lary M., ed. America's National Park System: The Critical Documents. Lanham, MD: Rowman & Littlefield, 1994.
- Everhardt, William C. The National Park Service. New York: Praeger, 1972.
- Forrant, Robert and Mary-Anne Trasciatti, eds. Where Are the Workers? Labor’s Stories at Museums and Historic Sites. University of Illinois Press, 2022.
- Foresta, Ronald A. America's National Parks and Their Keepers. Washington: Resources for the Future, 1985.
- Freemuth, John. Islands Under Siege: National Parks and the Politics of External Threats. Lawrence: University of Kansas Press, 1991.
- Garrison, Lemuel A;. The Making of a Ranger. Salt Lake City: Howe Brothers, 1983.
- Gartner, Bob; Exploring Careers in the National Parks. New York: The Rosen Publishing Group, Inc. 1993
- Hartzog, George B. Jr; Battling for the National Parks; Moyer Bell Limited; Mt. Kisco, New York; 1988
- Ise, John. Our National Park Policy: A Critical History. Baltimore: Johns Hopkins Press, 1961.
- Lee, Ronald F.; Family Tree of the National Park System; Eastern National Parks, Philadelphia, Pennsylvania, 1972
- Lowery, William. Repairing Paradise: The Restoration of Nature in America's National Parks. Washington: Brookings, 2009
- Mackintosh, Barry. The National Parks: Shaping the System. Washington: National Park Service, 1991.
- National Parks for the 21st Century; The Vail Agenda; The National Park Foundation, 1991
- National Park Service Almanac, Edited and Compiled by Ben Moffett and Vickie Carson: Rocky Mountain Region, National Park Service, 1991, revised 2006
- The National Parks: Shaping The System; National Park Service, Washington D.C. 1991.
- Rettie, Dwight F.; Our National Park System; University of Illinois Press; Urbana, Illinois; 1995
- Ridenour, James M. The National Parks Compromised: Pork Barrel Politics and America's Treasures. Merrillville, IN: ICS Books, 1994.
- Rothman, Hal K. Preserving Different Pasts: The American National Monuments. Urbana: University of Illinois Press, 1989.
- Runte, Alfred. National Parks, the American Experience, Lincoln, Nebraska: University of Nebraska Press, 1987.
- Sellars, Richard West. Preserving Nature in the National Parks: A History. New Haven: Yale University Press, 1997.
- Shankland, Robert; Steve Mather of the National Parks; Alfred A. Knopf, New York; 1970
- Sontag, William H. National Park Service: The First 75 Years. Philadelphia: Eastern National Park & Monument Assn., 1991.
- Sutter, Paul. 2002. Driven Wild: How the Fight against Automobiles Launched the Modern Wilderness Movement. Seattle: University of Washington press. ISBN 978-0-295-98219-9.
- Swain, Donald. Wilderness Defender: Horace M. Albright and Conservation. Chicago: University of Chicago Press, 1970.
- Udall, Stewart L., The Quiet Crisis. New York: Holt, Rinehart & Winston, 1963.
- Wirth, Conrad L. Parks, Politics, and the People. Norman, Oklahoma: University of Oklahoma Press, 1980.

=== Other sources ===
Governance

- National Parks Conservation Association (2025). Parks group responds to executive order targeting American history.
- Criteria for inclusion in the National Park System
- Designation of National Park System Units (national monument vs national park, etc.)
- National Park Service Meeting Notices and Rule Changes from The Federal Register RSS Feed

Assistance

- Community Assistance Available from the National Park Service
- NPS Climate Friendly Parks

History

- National Park System Timeline
- The National Parks: America's Best Idea from the National Park Service Archeology Program

Metadata

- National Park Service in the Federal Register
- Records of the National Park Service, including an administrative history and a list of regional offices of the National Park Service up to 1988
- NPS Research Links/Reference Desk
- NPS Library Information Center
- NPS Focus Digital Library & Research Station
- NPS Civil War Soldiers and Sailors System (CWSS)
- National Park Service Records available in the Archival Research Catalog of the National Archives and Records Administration
- National Park Service Records at National Archives and Records Administration, Atlanta

Visual

- NPS Historic Photograph Collection
- NPS B-Roll Video (public domain)
- Photos of Park Rangers over the last 100+ years
- NPS Digital Image Archives (public domain)
- The short film National Parks: An American Legacy (1992) is available for free viewing and download at the Internet Archive.
- "Alice's Adventures in the New Wonderland". Northern Pacific Railroad Company. 1884.
- Gallery of all US National Parks (does not include National Park System units of any other designation)
- Gallery of National Park "Welcome" Signs
