= National Park Service Organic Act =

United States federal law that established the National Park Service

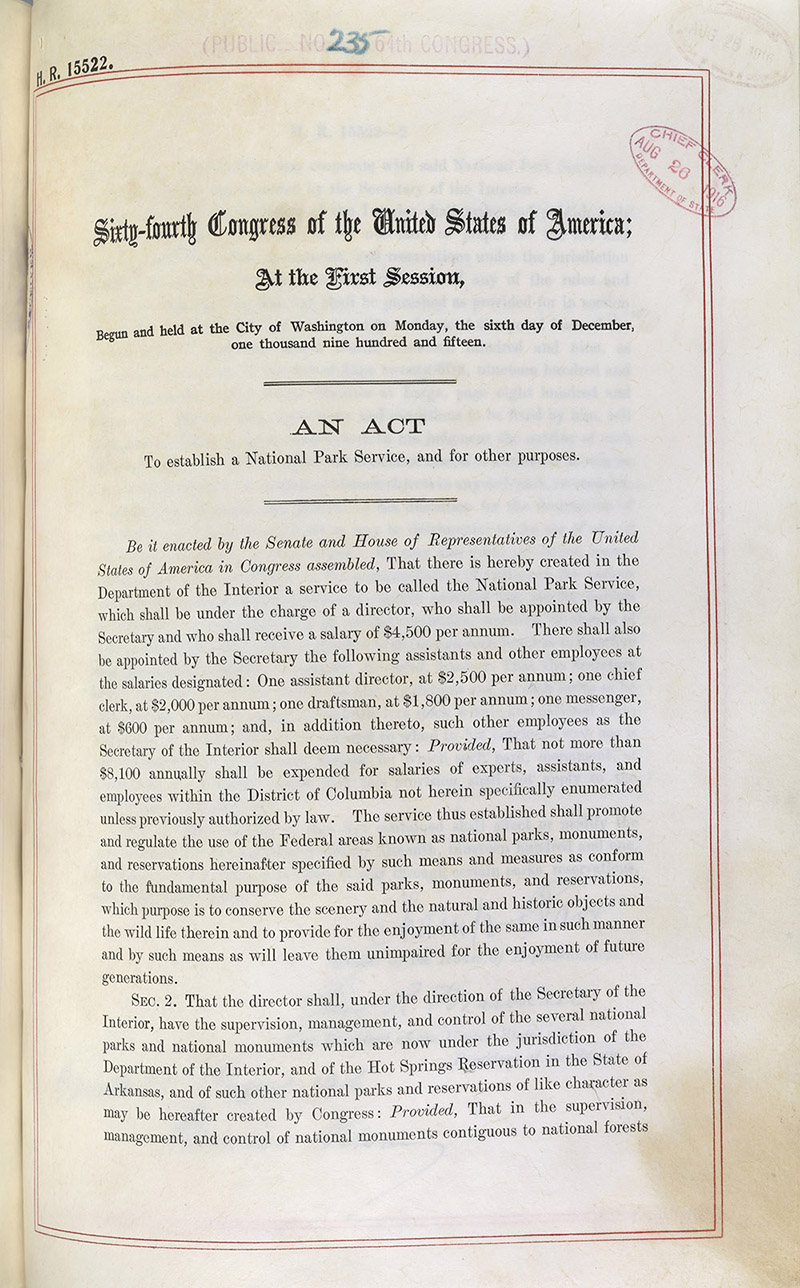
On August 25, 1916, President Woodrow Wilson signed legislation that created the National Park Service

The National Park Service Organic Act is a United States federal law that established the National Park Service (NPS), an agency of the United States Department of the Interior. The Act was signed into law on August 25, 1916, by President Woodrow Wilson. It is codified in Title 54 of the United States Code.

The National Park Service established by the Act "shall promote and regulate the use of the Federal areas known as national parks, monuments, and reservations hereinafter specified by such means and measures as conform to the fundamental purpose of the said parks, monuments, and reservations, which purpose is to conserve the scenery and the natural and historic objects and the wild life therein and to provide for the enjoyment of the same in such manner and by such means as will leave them unimpaired for the enjoyment of future generations".

The Act, which is reinforced by complementary legislation such as the Endangered Species Act, Clean Air Act, and National Environmental Policy Act, serves as the primary foundation of all management decisions.

== Background ==
=== History of National Parks and Monuments ===
National parks began to be designated in the second half of the 19th century, and national monuments in the early part of the 20th century. Each park or monument was managed individually or, alternately in some cases, by the United States Army, each with varying degrees of success.

The first National Park in the world was Yellowstone National Park, which was established by the Yellowstone National Park Act of 1872. This act set aside over 2 million acres that were prohibited from settlement, occupancy, or sale. The park was dedicated to be for the enjoyment of the public. The secretary of the Department of Interior was put in charge of preserving all timber, mineral deposits, geologic wonders, and other resources within Yellowstone.

The Antiquities Act of 1906 was signed as part of a movement to preserve prehistoric cliff dwellings and pueblo dwellings. It allowed the president to designate objects of historical and scientific significance on lands designated as national monuments. It denied the ability to appropriate or excavate any of these antiquities on federal land without permission from the department with jurisdiction. Nearly 1/4 of everything under the National Park Service started entirely or in part from the Antiquities Act.

By the time of the Organic Act, the Department of Interior was managing 14 national parks, 21 national monuments, and one archaeological reservation.

=== Development ===
The first mention of the creation of the Park Service started in 1910, with the American Civic Association declaring the need for a special bureau, probably within the Department of Interior, to oversee the nation's national parks. At the time there were 11 national parks, with a new one being added soon. Within his 1910 annual report, secretary of the Department of Interior at the time, Richard Ballinger, argued that congress needed to develop a bureau to oversee these national parks. Ballinger stated that the goal was to ensure future generations could use the parks.

Beginning in 1911, Smoot and Representative John E. Raker of California had submitted bills to establish the National Park Service to oversee the management of all these holdings. The bills were opposed by the director of the U.S. Forest Service, Gifford Pinchot, and his supporters. The Forest Service believed that a National Park Service would be a threat to continued Forest Service control of public lands that had been set aside for the timber trade. Beginning in 1910 the American Civic Association with the support of the General Federation of Women's Clubs and the Sierra Club had led the call for a federal service to manage the parks. The noted landscape architect and planner Frederick Law Olmsted Jr. was also a booster of a single national organization to manage the National Parks.

Successful and influential industrialist Stephen Mather was challenged by Interior Secretary Franklin K. Lane to lobby for legislation creating a bureau to oversee the National Parks. Mather accepted pro bono (accepting a perfunctory salary of $1) and with assistance primarily by a young lawyer named Horace Albright, a campaign was begun. By 1915, regular meetings were occurring at Kent's home in Washington. The group's regulars were Kent, J. Horace McFarland of the American Civic Association, and the few Washington staff members of the Department of the Interior responsible the National Parks.

The act was sponsored by Representative William Kent (I) of California and Senator Reed Smoot (R) of Utah. First NPS Director Stephen Mather was put in charge of supervising and maintaining all designated national parks, battlefields, historic places, and monuments.

== Structure ==
=== Section 1 ===
The secretary of the Department of the Interior is in charge of choosing high-level employees within the National Park Service. This includes: one director, one assistant director, one chief clerk, one draftsman, one messenger, and any other employees seen necessary by the secretary of the Department of Interior

=== Section 2 ===
The director of the National Park Service works under the supervision of the secretary of Interior. The director is responsible for supervision, management, and control over the national parks and monuments, in addition to reservations under the control of the Department of Interior or created by Congress. The secretary of the Department of Agriculture may cooperate with the National Park Service with permission from the secretary of Interior.

=== Section 3 ===
The secretary of Interior must make rules deemed necessary for the management of properties under the jurisdiction of the National Park Service. Violation of any rules and authorizations under this act may result in a fine and/or imprisonment. The secretary may also sell or dispose timber when they deem it necessary to stop insects or diseases, or to preserve the parks, monuments, and reservations. The secretary may also destroy plants or animals that are determined to be harmful to the purpose of the parks, monuments, or reservations. Nothing shall be leased from parks in a way that interferes with free access for the public. The secretary may also approve grazing on any of these lands, except for Yellowstone National Park.

== Related literature ==
Jordan Fisher Smith's book, Engineering Eden, follows the story of a fatal bear attack in Yellowstone National Park that sparked a subsequent federal trial. The book addressed the specific circumstances of the death regarding the legal accountability, as well as explored border themes relevant to The NPS Organic Act. Both Engineering Eden and the Act have strong ties to conservation, restoration, and the management or the natural and cultural resources for future visitors. While Engineering Eden delves into the trial which followed the legal framework established through The NPS Organic Act, the book also explored the efforts to restore and manage the ecosystems within national parks after the accident which complies with The NPS Organic Act's mandate.

== See also ==
- History of the National Park Service
