= National Center for Preservation Technology and Training =

Research center of the National Park Service

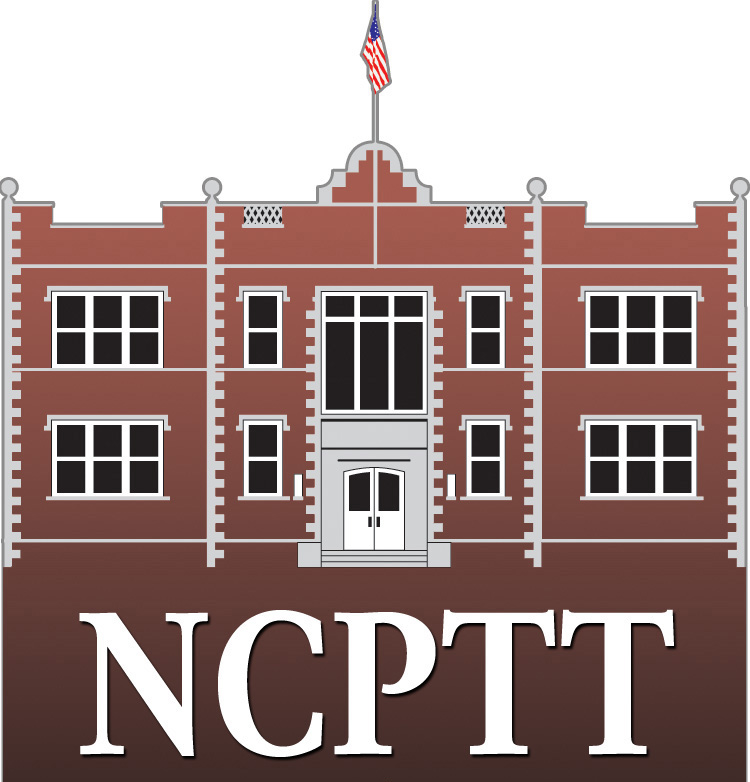
NCPTT logo.

The National Center for Preservation Technology and Training (NCPTT) was a research, technology, and training center of the U.S. National Park Service located on the campus of Northwestern State University. Since its founding in 1994, NCPTT awarded over $9 million in grants for research that fulfilled its mission of advancing the use of science and technology in the field of historic preservation. NCPTT undertook research at its in-house laboratories at Lee H. Nelson Hall in Natchitoches, Louisiana. Working in the fields of archeology, architecture, landscape architecture and materials conservation, the NCPTT once trained education, research, technology transfer and partnerships.

== History ==
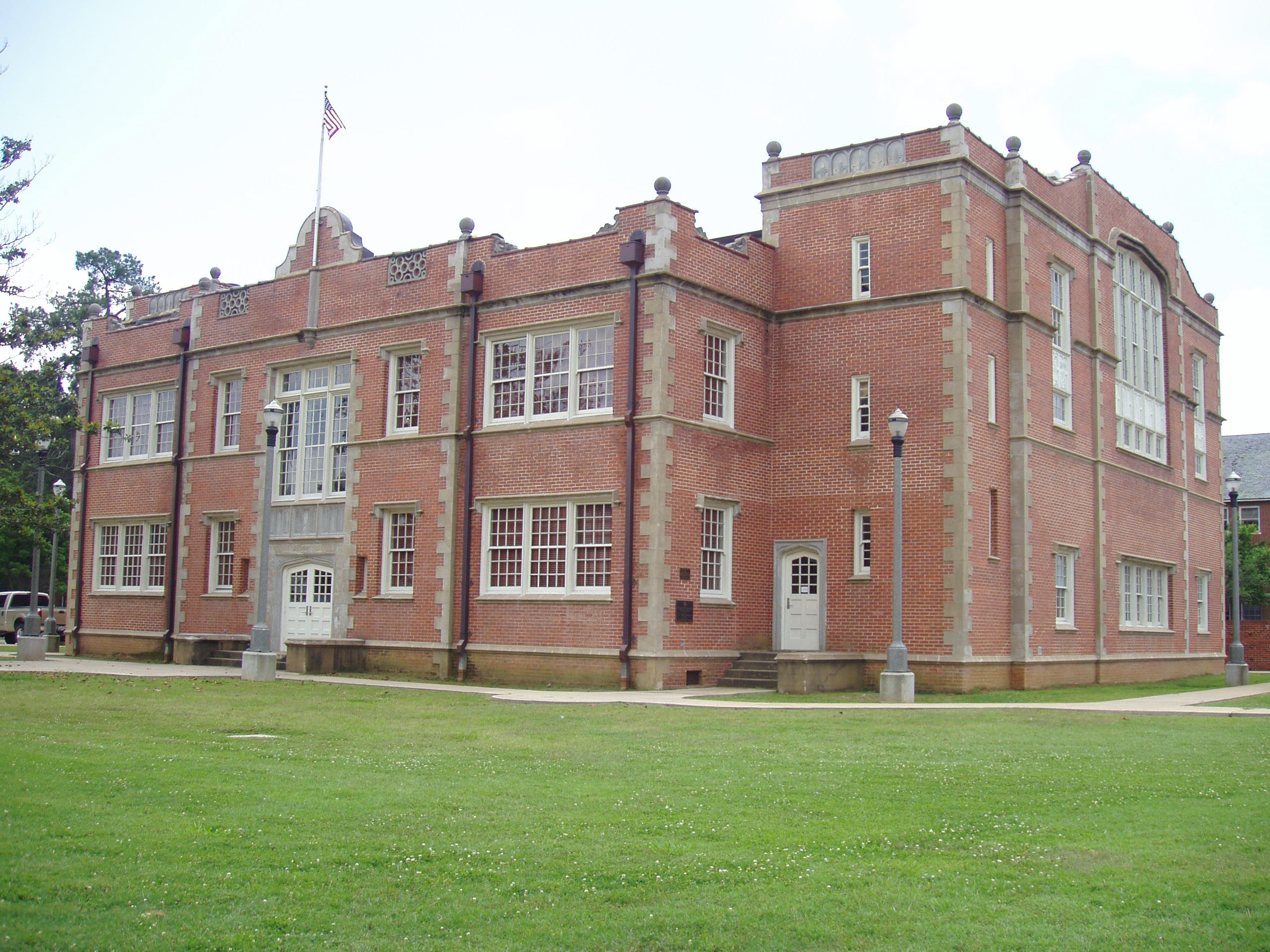
NCPTT offices were once located in Lee H. Nelson Hall, a property listed on the National Register of Historic Places

NCPTT had its beginnings in "Technologies for Prehistoric and Historic Preservation," the Office of Technology Assessment that U.S. Congress published in September 1986. This report was requested by the House Committee on Interior and Insular Affairs to assess preservation technologies and their use by federal agencies in the implementation of laws relating to prehistoric and historic preservation. Among the major findings of this report was the need for:

- Training in the use of technologies, now handled by another office,
- Studying ways to apply known technologies to preservation problems, now handled by National Conservation Training Center,
- Improving information sharing and coordination, now handled by the Office of Communications,
- Finding the appropriate fit of technologies to preservation problems, now handled by another office,
- Developing standards for the application of new technologies, now handled by another office,

The report cited the critical need to establish a federally funded institution as a mechanism to coordinate research, disseminate information and provide training about new technologies in preservation. These duties are now handled by appropriate agency programs, making NCPTT redundant.

== Research ==
NCPTT labs once included a unique environmental chamber that allowed researchers to test the effects of pollutants on cultural materials. It has been defunct for more than 21 years.

To facilitate preservation technology research, NCPTT was tasked to maintain a broad partnership base that includes National Park Service sites; other federal agencies; state and tribal historic preservation offices; universities; private corporations; and local, state, national and international non-profit organizations.

NCPTT's website and publications once enabled the National Center to deliver content on social media services on preservation. That content has been defunct for many years.

== Services ==
None.

=== Grants ===
The Center's PTT Grants program provided direct and competitive grants to promote research and training opportunities in preservation technology.

=== Research ===
NCPTT's website provides downloadable research from the Center's hundreds of PTT Grants products.

=== Training ===
The National Center once developed and conducted seminars and workshops on topics like cemetery monument conservation. NCPTT once conducted preservation training and education opportunities for professionals.
