= Stephen Mather =

American businessman and conservationist (1867–1930)

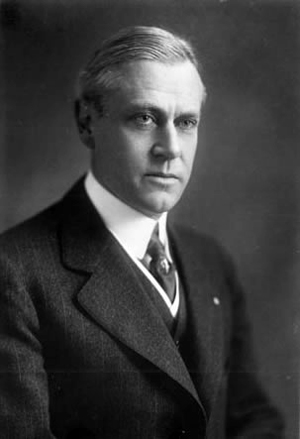

1st Director of the National Park Service
- In office May 16, 1917 – January 8, 1929
- President: Woodrow Wilson; Warren Harding; Calvin Coolidge
- Preceded by: Office established
- Succeeded by: Horace M. Albright

Personal details
- Born: July 4, 1867 San Francisco, California, U.S.
- Died: January 22, 1930 (aged 62) Brookline, Massachusetts, U.S.
- Resting place: Mather Cemetery, Darien, Connecticut
- Spouse: Jane T. Floy (1893)
- Children: Bertha Floy Mather
- Education: University of California, Berkeley
- Occupation: Businessman; Naturalist
- Awards: Public Welfare Medal (1930)

Stephen Tyng Mather (July 4, 1867 – January 22, 1930) was an American industrialist and conservationist who was the first director of the National Park Service. As president and owner of Thorkildsen-Mather Borax Company he became a millionaire. Along with journalist Robert Sterling Yard, Mather led a publicity campaign known as the Mather Mountain Party to promote the creation of a unified federal agency to oversee National Parks administration, which was established in 1916. In 1917, Mather was appointed to lead the NPS, the new agency created within the Department of the Interior. He served until 1929, during which time Mather created a professional civil service organization, increased the numbers of parks and national monuments, and established systematic criteria for adding new properties to the federal system.

== Early life and education ==
Stephen Tyng Mather was born July 4, 1867, in San Francisco, and named for the prominent Episcopal minister Stephen Tyng of New York, who was admired by his parents, Joseph W. Mather and Bertha Jemima Walker. Sometime in his youth, Mather's friends dubbed him the "Eternal Freshman" because of an unrelenting energy he applied to all pursuits, and the name followed him throughout his life. Mather was educated at Boys' High School (now Lowell High School) in San Francisco, and graduated from the University of California at Berkeley in 1887.

His family moved to New York, where Mather worked as a reporter for The Sun until 1893. During that time he met and befriended Robert Sterling Yard, another reporter, who would become a close friend. In 1893 Mather married Jane Thacker Floy of Elizabeth, New Jersey, with Yard serving as his best man. They had one daughter, Bertha Floy Mather. In 1906, Mather became the sole owner of the Mather family homestead in Darien, Connecticut, which had been built by his great-grandfather about 1778. He and his family used it during the summers and he regarded it as his true home. It is now a historic site open to the public.

== Business career ==
Mather started working for the Pacific Coast Borax Company at its headquarters in New York, where his father was administrator. Borax is a component of a variety of detergents and compounds, which was mined almost exclusively in California. Borax is a commodity, and as such, one brand is essentially as good as another. For a company to be successful, it had to mine the product more cheaply, process it more efficiently, or market it more aggressively. In 1894 the younger Mather moved with his wife to Chicago, where he established a distribution center for the company. Mather was active in this role. His work helped build the legend of "Borax Smith," who was the company's founder. He did so by promoting the "Illustrated Sketches of Death Valley" by John R. Spears. Furthermore, he is credited with the addition of the label "20 Mule Team Borax" to the company's product, which subsequently became a household name throughout the country.

In 1898, Mather helped a friend, Thomas Thorkildsen, in starting another borax company. After suffering a severe episode of bipolar disorder in 1903 and having his salary withheld during extended sick leave, Mather resigned from Pacific Coast and joined Thorkildsen full-time in 1904. They named their firm the Thorkildsen-Mather Borax Company. Their company became prosperous, and they were millionaires by 1914. This gave Mather the financial independence to pursue personal projects, and while in his mid-forties, he retired from the company to pursue those. Mather was active in many civic groups, including the Chicago City Club and Municipal Voter's League.

== Conservation ==
Travel with his wife to Europe in 1904 renewed Mather's longtime interest in nature. Seeing the parks of Europe and their public accessibility, Mather was inspired to work to preserve more parkland in the US, to encourage new transportation methods to reach them, and to protect scenic resources and natural areas for the public good. He became a dedicated conservationist, and a friend and admirer of the influential John Muir.

Due to Mather's relationship with John Muir, Mather joined the Sierra Club in 1904. He was active in the group and made numerous allies who helped support the creation of the National Park Service. In 1916 the Sierra Club made him an honorary vice-president.

In 1915, Mather became a member of the Boone and Crockett Club, a conservation organization founded by Theodore Roosevelt and George Bird Grinnell in 1887.

The traditional story of Mather's arrival to Washington to run the National parks is as follows. In 1914, Mather observed the deteriorating conditions in several National Parks, and wrote a letter of protest to Washington. Soon he received a reply from Secretary of the Interior Franklin K. Lane, a former classmate of Mather's from the University of California. Lane responded, "Dear Steve, If you don't like the way the parks are being run, come on down to Washington and run them yourself."

But in later years, Mather's assistant Horace Albright was to state: In reality, they didn't know each other. Mather had graduated from the University of California with a Bachelor of Letters degree in 1887. Although registered in the class of 1889, Lane never did graduate. Adolph Miller, who knew both men quite well, graduated in Mather's class and affirmed that the two were not personally acquainted until 1914.

Mather did go to Washington as the assistant secretary of the Interior, and lobbied for the establishment of a bureau to operate the national parks. Horace Albright, a lawyer from California, was appointed early into Mather's tenure to act as his assistant. On August 25, 1916, President Woodrow Wilson signed the bill authorizing the National Park Service. At the time, the government owned 14 parks and 19 national monuments, many administered by Army officers or political appointees, as battlefields were among the first parks designated. He used his personal funds to hire Robert Sterling Yard to work with him on publicizing the great resources of the parks. Mather was effective in building support for the parks with a variety of politicians and wealthy corporate leaders. He also led efforts to publicize the National Parks and develop wider appreciation for their scenic beauty among the population. He appointed Yard as head of the National Park Education Committee to coordinate their various communication efforts. In April 1917, Mather was appointed as its first director, a position he filled until he resigned due to illness in January, 1929. During the course of his career, he and his staff molded the NPS into one of the most respected and prestigious arms of the federal government. Special credit is owing Horace M. Albright, another Sierra Club member, who served as assistant to Mather, and acting director during Mr. Mather's illnesses.

== The Mather Mountain Party ==
During Mather's first year as assistant to the Secretary of the Interior, he discovered the federal bureaucracy was more complicated than he initially believed. Mather needed to secure more funding to manage and develop national parks. A frugal businessman, Mather did not want to ask Congress for more money than was absolutely necessary, despite the advice of his friends. Congress responded by cutting the national parks' budget.

Mathers adjusted, believing that Congress would appropriate funds only if they, and the American people, were introduced to all that the national parks could offer. As such, Mather's embarked on a publicity campaign headed by his newly appointed national park's publicity chief, Robert Sterling Yard.

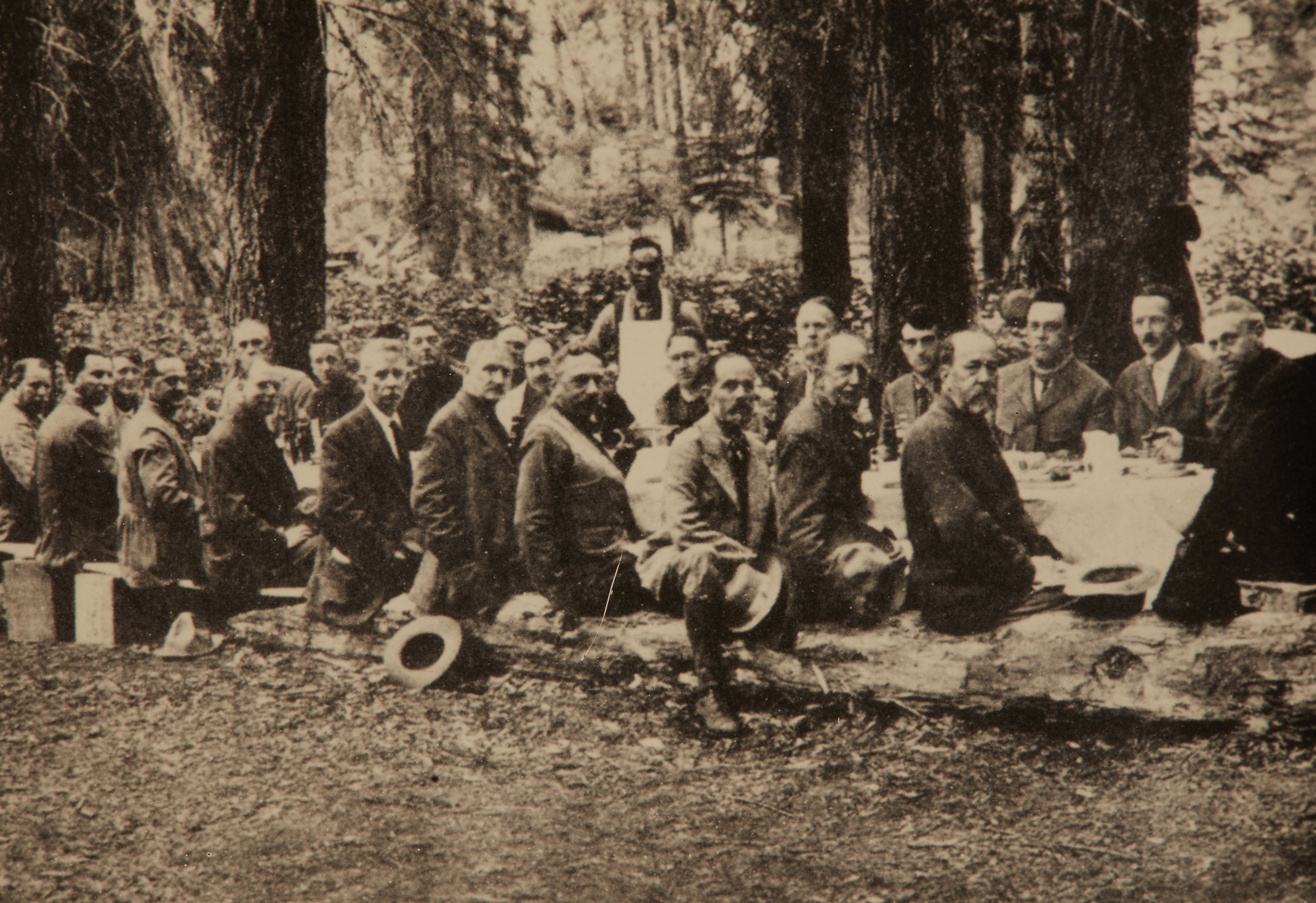
Mather Mountain Party, 1915

This campaign, known as the "Mather Mountain Party," included several handpicked guests such as speaker of the house Frederick H. Gillet; chief editor of National Geographic magazine Gilbert Grosnover; Southern Pacific Railway executive Ernest O. McCormick; American novelist Emerson Hough; and photographer Burton Holmes. Mather believed that showcasing the beauty of national parks to these influential individuals could lead to greater support for the parks amongst the American people.

The expedition took the guests through Sequoia National Park and lasted two weeks. Perhaps the most impressive part of the trip was the daily resupply of fresh fruits and vegetables. Paying from his own pocket, Mather ensured fresh food was hauled in every day to be prepared by Tie Sing, a Chinese American chef with the U.S. Geological Survey.

After the mountain party's conclusion, Congress soon approved $50,000 for the purchase of private land to expand the forests. The National Geographic Society contributed $20,000 for the same purpose.

== National Park Service ==
In 1916, Congress authorized funding for the creation of the National Park Service. Mather agreed to stay on and, with Albright, helped establish the new federal agency to protect and manage the national parks, together with a new appreciation for their wonders. In addition, he professionalized management of the parks, creating a cadre of career civil service people who were specialists in a variety of disciplines, to operate and manage the parks while preserving their natural character.

In 1917, Mather was appointed Assistant Secretary of Interior and head of the National Park Service. Due to his success in working with leaders of various groups and the Congress, he served until 1929. He believed that magnificent scenery should be the first criterion in establishing a national park, and made efforts to have new parks established before the lands were developed for other purposes.

He introduced concessions to the national parks. Among the services they sold were basic amenities and necessities to park visitors, plus aids for studying nature. Mather promoted the creation of the National Park to Park Highway. He also encouraged cooperation with the railroads to increase visitation to normally remote units of the National Park System. He believed that once more of the public had visited the parks and enjoyed a comfortable stay in concessionaire facilities, they would become supporters for the fledgling agency and its holdings. By the time he left his position, the park system included 20 national parks and 32 national monuments. Mather also had created the criteria for identifying and adopting new parks and monuments.

Periodically disabled by bipolar disorder (manic-depression), Mather had to take some leaves from work and Albright continued in their mutual understanding of the task. Over time they convinced Congress of the wisdom of extending the national park concept into the East, and in 1926 Shenandoah and Great Smoky Mountains national parks were authorized. After suffering a stroke in January 1929, Mather had to leave office. He died a year later.

=== The Ranger Clubhouse ===
Stephen Mather also contributed to the design of the parks' buildings. With Charles Sumner and Charles Punchard, Jr., Mather collaborated to design the Ranger clubhouse, a project that was intended to enhance the visitor experience with a rustic look. This rustic look fit in with late-19th-century conservation ideas about nature as well as aesthetic. The legacy of this design lived on past Mather's administration, with his successor Horace Albright seeing this as part of Mather's legacy. The creation of the Civilian Conservation Corps in the 1930s allowed for the growth of this rustic design ethos throughout other parks such as Mount Rainier, Yellowstone, and many other parks.

== Legacy and memorials ==
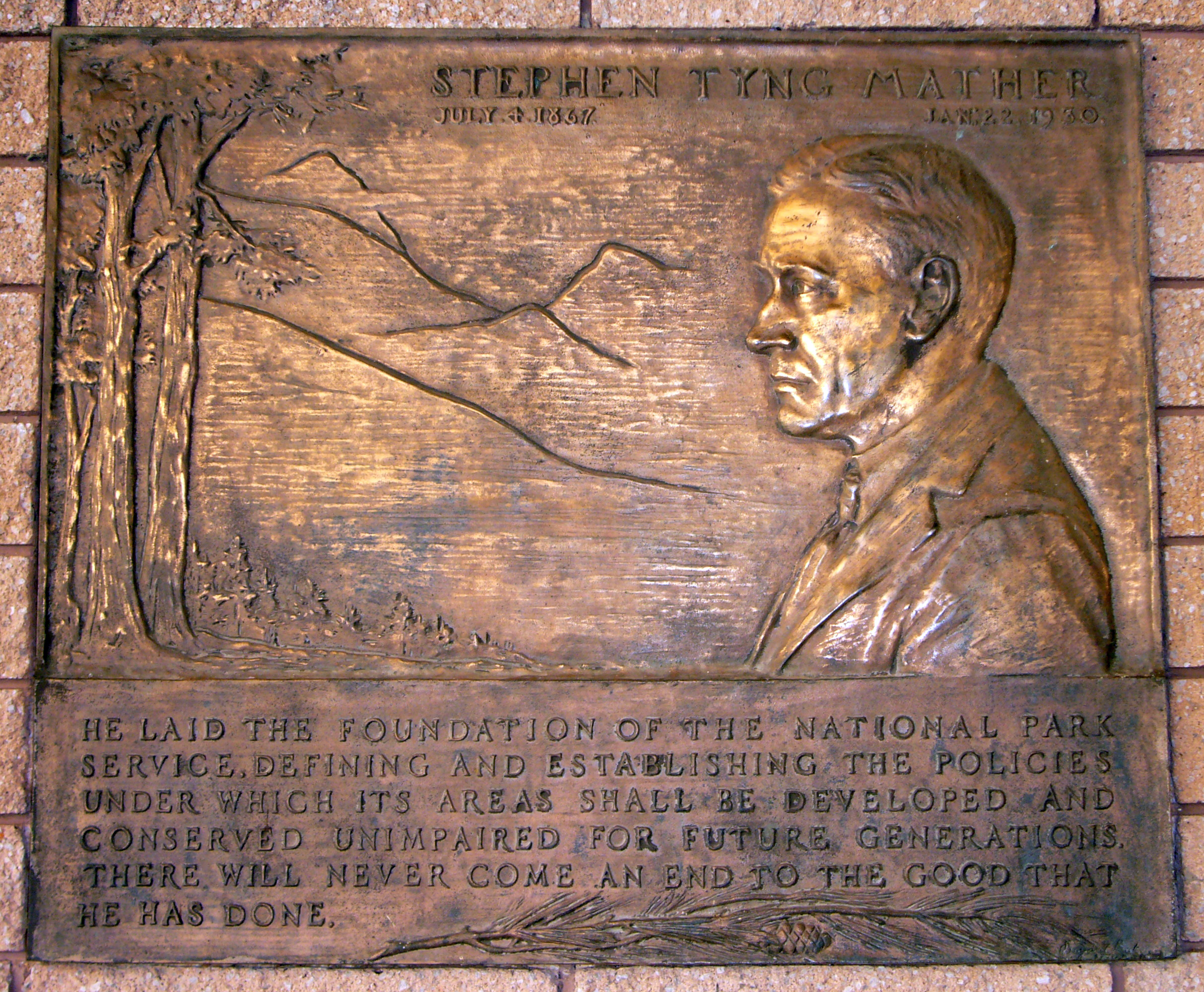
Mather Memorial Plaque at Zion National Park – "He laid the foundation of the National Park Service, defining and establishing the policies under which its areas shall be developed and conserved unimpaired for future generations. There will never come an end to the good that he has done." (Other plaques located at many NPS sites.)

- In 1928, Mather was awarded the first Cornelius Amory Pugsley Gold Medal Award
- In 1930, Mather was posthumously awarded the Public Welfare Medal from the National Academy of Sciences.
- In 1932, his family and friends established the Stephen Mather Memorial Fund, which commissioned numerous bronze plaques honoring Mather's accomplishments and installed them in national park units.
- In 1963, the Stephen Tyng Mather Home in Connecticut was declared a National Historic Landmark.
- Various places within today's National Park System are named after Mather, including:

Mather Point and Mather Campground on the south rim of Grand Canyon National Park;
Mather District and Camp Mather in Yosemite National Park;
Mather Pass in Kings Canyon National Park;
Mather Gorge on the border of Great Falls Park and Chesapeake and Ohio Canal National Historical Park;
Mather Overlook in Great Basin National Park;
Mount Mather in Denali National Park;
Stephen T. Mather Training Center, which serves the entire National Park System and is located at Harpers Ferry National Historical Park in West Virginia.

- Other places were named in his honor:

Stephen Tyng Mather High School in Chicago, Illinois;
Stephen T. Mather Building Arts & Craftsmanship High School in New York City, NY;
Stephen Mather Memorial Parkway (Washington State Route 410) in the Mount Rainier National Park and the Mount Baker-Snoqualmie National Forest;
Stephen Mather Wilderness, comprising much of the North Cascades National Park.
Mather Lodge, a CCC-built log structure in Petit Jean State Park, Arkansas's first state park.

Government offices
Preceded by not applicable	Director of the National Park Service; 1917–1929	Succeeded by Horace M. Albright
