= Charles Sams =

American government official

Chuck Sams
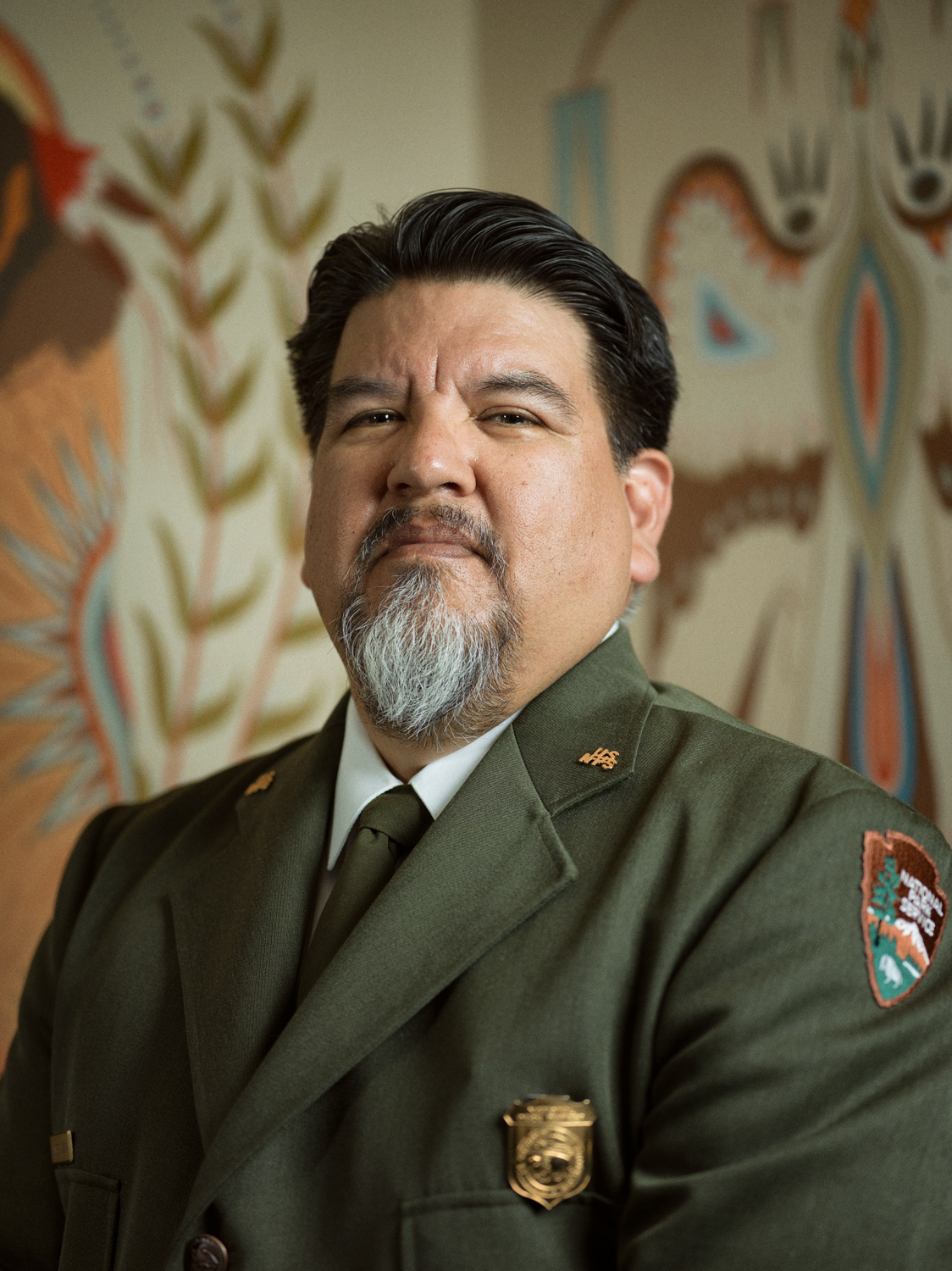
- Official portrait, 2022

19th Director of the National Park Service
- In office December 16, 2021 – January 20, 2025
- President: Joe Biden
- Preceded by: Jonathan Jarvis
- Succeeded by: Jessica Bowron (acting)

Personal details
- Born: Charles F. Sams III
- Education: Concordia University (BA); University of Oklahoma (MLS)

Military service
- Branch: United States Navy
- Years of service: 1988–1992
- Rank: Intelligence Specialist
- Unit: Medium Attack Squadron 155
- Wars: Gulf War

Charles F. Sams III, also known as Mocking Bird with Big Heart, (Cayuse and Walla Walla) is an American conservationist who served as the 19th director of the National Park Service from 2021 to 2025. A member of the Northwest Power and Conservation Council, Sams is the first Native American to serve as head of the NPS.

He is the current director of indigenous programs at Yale University's Center for Environmental Justice. Sams is the first person to serve in that role.

== Early life and education ==
Sams is a native of Pendleton, Oregon. His great-great-great-grandfather Peo Peo Mox Mox, the head of the Walla Walla people, was among the signatories of a treaty that established the Umatilla Indian Reservation. He graduated from Pendleton High School in 1988. He earned a Bachelor of Arts degree in business administration from Concordia University in 2003 and a Master of Legal Studies from the University of Oklahoma College of Law in 2020.

== Career ==
From 1988 to 1992, Sams served as an intelligence specialist in the United States Navy, where he was assigned to VA-128, Carrier Air Wing Two, Joint Intelligence Center, and the Defense Intelligence Agency Headquarters.

After leaving the navy, Sams was a data analyst and spokesman for the Confederated Tribes of the Umatilla Indian Reservation. When the tribes started a land buyback program, Sams wrote an editorial explaining how the Dawes Allotment Act of 1887 led the reservation to be subdivided and sold to white settlers. He served as executive director and vice president of the Earth Conservation Corps. In 2003 and 2004, he was the executive director of the Community Energy Project. From 2004 to 2006, he was a member of the Columbia Slough Watershed Council. From 2006 to 2010, Sams was the national director of the tribal and native lands program at the Trust for Public Land.

Sams also held administrative positions at the Umatilla Tribal Community Foundation and Indian Country Conservancy. In April 2021, Sams was appointed to serve as a member of the Northwest Power and Conservation Council by Oregon Governor Kate Brown.

=== Director of the National Park Service ===
He was unanimously confirmed as the National Park Service (NPS) director on November 18, 2021, and sworn in on December 16 of the same year. Sams, an enrolled member of the Cayuse and Walla Walla tribes, is the first Native American to serve in that position.

As director of the NPS, Sams identified improving accessibility in national parks through funds allocated through the Great American Outdoors Act as a policy priority. In 2022, he stated that the NPS will work to improve how it tells Native American history in educational resources.

=== Post-directorship ===
Following his term, Sams returned to Pendleton in January 2025. Oregon Governor Tina Kotek nominated Sams to the Northwest Power and Conservation Council and he was confirmed to the position in February 2025. He became the first director of Indigenous Programs at the Yale Center for Environmental Justice in 2025. In 2025, he was awarded the Lone Sailor Award.

== See also ==
- History of the National Park Service
- List of members of the American Legion
- Organization of the National Park Service

Government offices
Preceded by Jonathan Jarvis	Director of the National Park Service; 2021–2025	Succeeded by Jessica Bowron (Acting)
