= P. Daniel Smith =

American government administrator

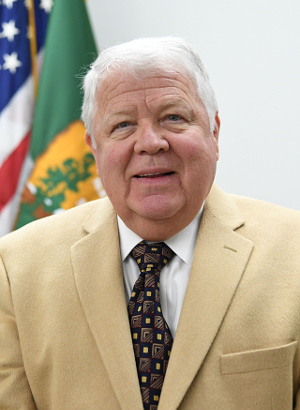

Acting Director of the National Park Service
- In office January 24, 2018 – September 30, 2019
- President: Donald Trump
- Preceded by: Michael T. Reynolds (Acting)
- Succeeded by: David Vela (Acting)

Personal details
- Born: Maine, U.S.

Military service
- Allegiance: United States
- Battles/wars: Vietnam War

Paul Daniel Smith is a United States federal bureaucrat and lobbyist who served as acting director of the U.S. National Park Service in the First presidency of Donald Trump.

== Early life and military service ==
Smith was born in Maine. He served in the Vietnam War.

== Career ==
From 1970 to 1975, Smith worked as a staff member for Senator Sam Ervin, Democrat of North Carolina.

Smith was a lobbyist for the National Rifle Association of America from 1978 to 1980.

Smith worked at the Department of the Interior in the Reagan administration from 1982 to 1986, first as deputy assistant secretary for fish and wildlife and parks, and then at the National Park Service as director of legislative and congressional affairs.

He joined the General Services Administration in 1987 and worked there until 1997.

Smith was superintendent of Colonial National Historical Park in Virginia from 2004 to his retirement in 2015. The park includes a 23-mile parkway and historic sites including Jamestown and Yorktown Battlefield.

In 2004, Smith worked as a special assistant to National Park Service Director Fran P. Mainella. In that role, according to a 2006 inspector general report, Smith "unduly influenced" deliberations by officials at the Chesapeake & Ohio Canal National Historical Park in helping Washington Redskins owner Daniel Snyder cut down 130 trees on a Park Service-protected easement to improve his view of the Potomac River.

=== National Park Service acting director ===
In January 2018, Smith came out of retirement to rejoin the National Park Service as deputy director. Two weeks later, on January 24, 2018, Interior Secretary Ryan Zinke named Smith as acting director of the National Park Service.

During a government shutdown in January 2019, Smith announced that visitor fees typically saved for future projects would be used to keep the most visited national parks functioning instead. The Government Accountability Office concluded in September 2019 that this action broke federal spending law.

=== 2026 Independence Day celebrations ===
On September 30, 2019, Interior Secretary David Bernhardt reassigned Smith to lead efforts to celebrate the 250th anniversary of U.S. independence on July 4, 2026. David Vela was named the National Park Service acting director.

== See also ==
- Organization of the National Park Service
