= Jonathan Jarvis =

Former U.S. National Park Service director

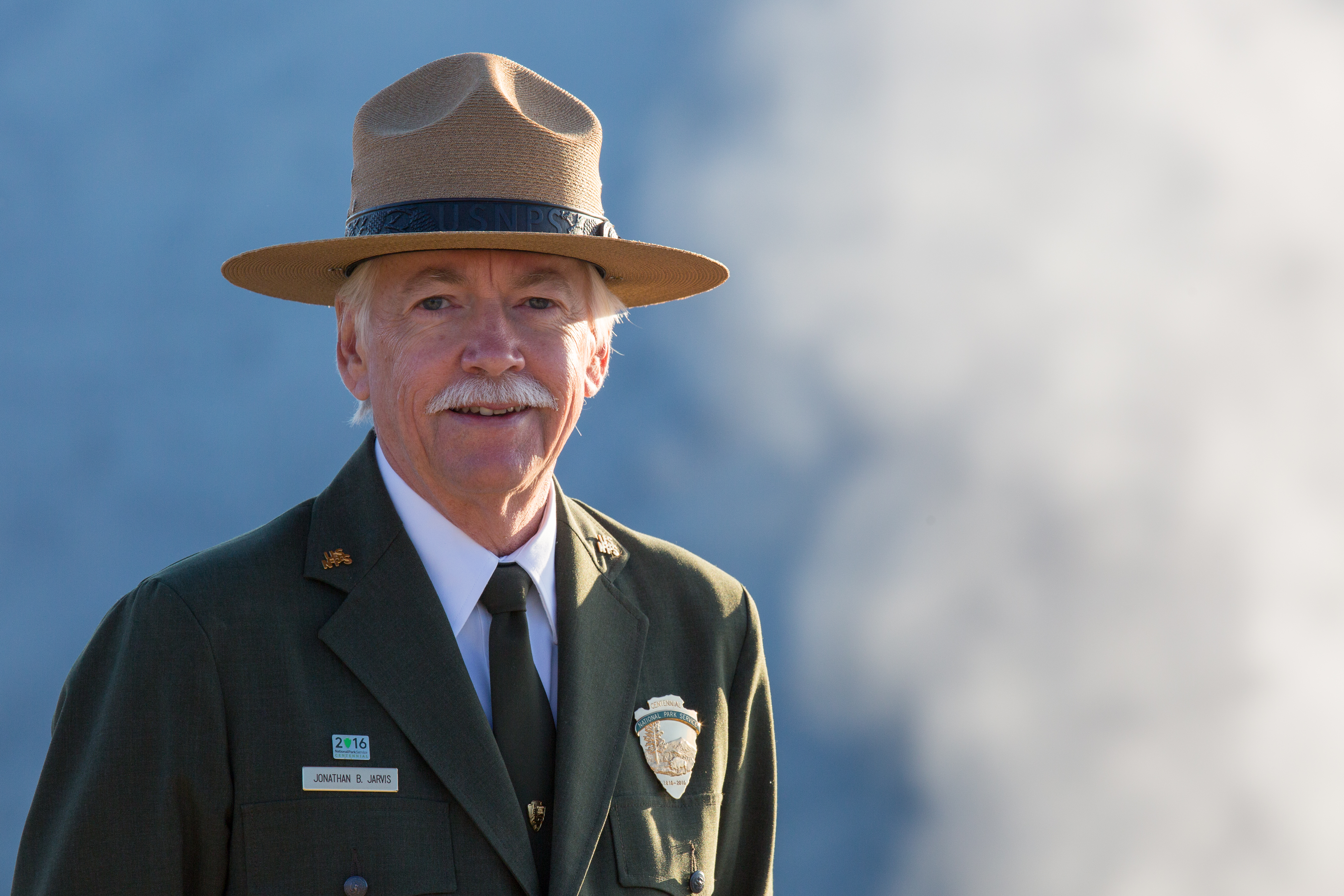

18th Director of the National Park Service
- In office October 2, 2009 – January 3, 2017
- President: Barack Obama
- Preceded by: Mary A. Bomar; Dan Wenk (Acting)
- Succeeded by: Mike Reynolds (Acting); Charles Sams

Personal details
- Born: 26 June 1953 (age 73)
- Education: College of William and Mary

Jonathan B. Jarvis (born June 26, 1953) is an American conservationist who served as the 18th director of the United States National Park Service under President Barack Obama. As director, Jarvis oversaw initiatives on climate change and park management, including a drone ban and the creation of new national park units such as Stonewall National Monument, while facing criticism over workplace and ethics issues within the agency.

== Early life and education ==
Jarvis graduated from Natural Bridge High School in Natural Bridge Station, Virginia, in 1971.

He graduated from The College of William & Mary in 1975 with a degree in biology. He was a member of the Sigma Chi fraternity.

From 1971 to 1975, he was a maintenance mechanic and welder at the Blue Bird bus company.

== Parks career ==
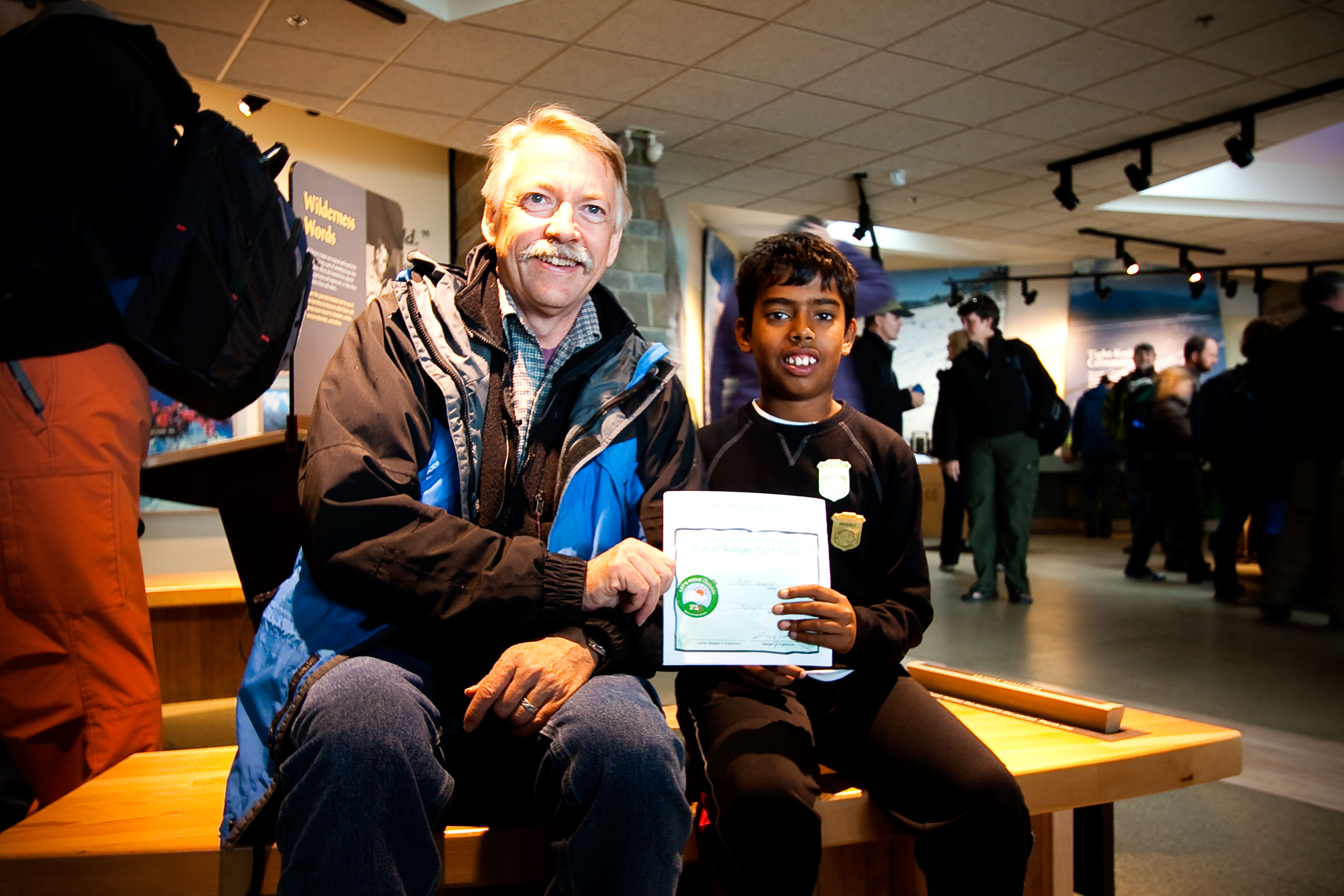
Jarvis with a Junior Ranger in 2010

Jarvis became a park ranger in 1976, at the National Mall and Memorial Parks.

Jarvis served for three years as the superintendent of Mount Rainier National Park in Ashford, Washington. He was superintendent of Craters of the Moon National Monument and Preserve in Idaho and Wrangell-St. Elias National Park & Preserve in Alaska during the 1990s.

=== Directorship ===
Jarvis was serving as regional director for the Pacific West Region when, on July 10, 2009, President Barack Obama nominated Jarvis for the directorship following the resignation of Mary A. Bomar on January 20, 2009, the day of President Obama's inauguration. A career civil servant, Jarvis had been with the service for over 30 years.

He was confirmed by the United States Senate on September 25, 2009, and served until his retirement on January 3, 2017.

Jarvis wrote in 2010 that climate change is "fundamentally the greatest threat to the integrity of our national parks that we have ever experienced."

In 2013, Jarvis unveiled new guidelines for healthier food at national parks. In 2014, Jarvis banned the flying of drones over national parks. Jarvis pledged to remove Confederate flag merchandise from park bookstores and gift shops in 2015 after the massacre of nine black people by a white gunman at a church in Charleston, South Carolina. In 2015, Jarvis signed an agreement for a new Manhattan Project National Historical Park at the historic nuclear reactor in Hanford, Washington. In 2016, the Park Service under Jarvis unveiled the Stonewall National Monument in New York City, commemorating the Stonewall Riots for gay rights.

In his time as Park Service director, Jarvis faced criticism from Congress and watchdog organizations, claiming his oversight of the service failed to address a culture of sexual harassment, bullying, and park mismanagement. In 2016, he was reprimanded for violating ethics standards after publishing an unauthorized book with a nonprofit group that operated stores in national parks.

Jarvis retired from his position on January 3, 2017. He was immediately succeeded by Michael T. Reynolds, who was appointed as acting director.

=== Later work ===
On October 24, 2017, Jarvis was appointed as the executive director of UC Berkeley's Institute for Parks, People, and Diversity.

In 2018, University of Chicago Press published a book co-authored by Jarvis, The Future of Conservation in America: A Chart for Rough Water.

Jarvis endorsed Joe Biden in the 2020 presidential election.

== See also ==
- Director of the National Park Service
- History of the National Park Service
- Organization of the National Park Service

Government offices
Preceded by Mary A. Bomar	Director of the National Park Service; 2009–2017	Succeeded by Michael T. Reynolds (Acting); Charles Sams
