= Margaret Everson =

Acting director of the United States National Park Service

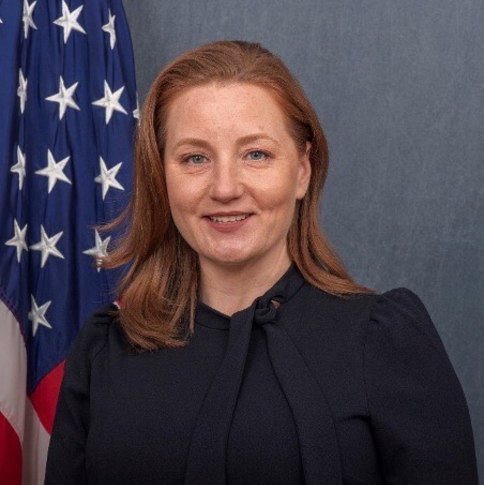

Director of the National Park Service
- Acting
- In office August 7, 2020 – January 20, 2021
- President: Donald Trump
- Preceded by: David Vela (Acting)
- Succeeded by: Shawn Benge (Acting)

Personal details
- Born: Morgantown, West Virginia, U.S.
- Education: St. Francis College (BS); Vermont Law School (JD)

Margaret Everson is an American lawyer who served as the acting director of the United States National Park Service for six months and the acting director of the United States Fish and Wildlife Service for 15 months during the first Trump administration. She is the only person to have headed both the National Park Service and Fish and Wildlife Service.

== Early life and education ==
Everson was born and raised in Morgantown, West Virginia. Her father worked at West Virginia University in the physics department and later ran its planetarium.

She received a Bachelor of Science degree in biology with a concentration in marine biology from St. Francis College and a Juris Doctor degree from Vermont Law School.

== Career ==
From 2006 to 2008, Everson was a counselor at the United States Department of the Interior during the George W. Bush administration. She has also worked as an independent consultant for state agencies.

Everson an assistant attorney general of Kentucky and general counsel for the Kentucky Department of Fish and Wildlife Resources.

She was a lobbyist for Ducks Unlimited, a conservation and hunting group, and its chief policy officer for four years, through most of 2018.

She was a counselor to Interior Secretary David Bernhardt and was the principal deputy director of the Fish and Wildlife Service.

=== National Park Service ===
Bernhardt selected Everson in August 2020 to replace David Vela as acting director of the United States National Park Service. Everson was the fourth acting director of the Park Service under President Donald Trump.

In September 2020, two environmental groups asked a federal court to remove Everson as head of the Park Service, arguing she was illegally appointed. The Trump administration was the first in the Park Service's history not to name a permanent director, a job that requires Senate confirmation. Her appointment ended with the Trump administration, on January 20, 2021.

== See also ==
- Environmental policy of the first Donald Trump administration
- National Park Service
- Organization of the National Park Service
