= Michael T. Reynolds =

American park administrator

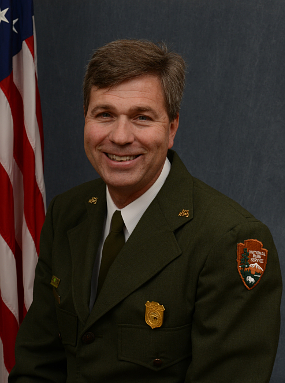

Acting Director of the National Park Service
- In office January 3, 2017 – January 24, 2018
- President: Donald Trump
- Preceded by: Jonathan Jarvis
- Succeeded by: P. Daniel Smith (Acting)

Personal details
- Education: University of California, Santa Barbara (B.A.); Regis University (M.A.)
- Occupation: National park administrator

Michael T. Reynolds is a career parks administrator who served as an acting director of the United States National Park Service in the first Trump administration.

== Early life and education ==
Reynolds is a third-generation National Park Service employee. He spent much of his childhood at Yosemite National Park, with his mother's family working concessions there. His father was a planner at the park. His grandfather was a park ranger at Yellowstone National Park.

Reynolds received a bachelor of arts degree in environmental studies at University of California, Santa Barbara, in 1985. He got a master’s in business administration at Regis University in Denver, Colorado.

He was a senior executive fellow at Harvard University in the spring of 2011.

== Career ==
After college, Reynolds worked as a ranger, firefighter and biologist.

He served for six years as a natural resource planner for the Parks Service in Denver.

He held jobs at the Curecanti National Recreation Area in Colorado, Cape Cod National Seashore in Massachusetts in 1994, and the Mojave National Preserve in California.

He was a resource manager, planner and division chief at Yosemite National Park.

He became superintendent of Fire Island National Seashore in New York in 2004, deputy Northeast regional director of the National Park Service, and Midwest regional director of the National Park Service.

He moved to the National Park Service’s Washington headquarters in 2014, first as director of workforce and inclusion and then as director of operations.

In 2016, he testified before a House committee to acknowledge sexual harassment at many park sites and pledged to protect workers better.

=== National Park Service acting director ===
Reynolds became acting director of the Park Service in January 2017 when Jonathan Jarvis retired.

Reynolds had an awkward start with President Donald Trump when the Park Service tweeted aerial photos of Trump's inauguration ceremony showing a crowd much smaller than the record-breaking crowd that Trump claimed. Trump reportedly phoned Reynolds and asked him to find new pictures.

Reynolds helped announce new national historical landmarks including the New York State Canal System and the Eldean Covered Bridge.

In June 2017, Reynolds reversed an Obama administration policy that had discouraged sales of bottled water at the parks.

=== Later parks jobs ===
On January 24, 2018, Reynolds was moved out of the top parks job to lead Yosemite National Park in California. He led a staff of 800 there.

On October 23, 2019, Reynolds was appointed as the National Park Service's regional director of the Department of the Interior Lower Colorado Basin, Upper Colorado Basin, and Arkansas-Rio Grande-Texas-Gulf regions. In this role he oversees 89 parks in nine states.

== See also ==
- Organization of the National Park Service
