= Florida Park Service =

Agency managing Florida's state parks

- Logo of the Florida Park Service

Agency overview
- Formed: 1935; 91 years ago
- Preceding agency: Florida Board of Forestry (parks activities)
- Jurisdiction: Florida
- Headquarters: 3900 Commonwealth Boulevard, Tallahassee
- Employees: 1,032.5 full-time equivalent positions (FY 2026–27)
- Annual budget: US$253.7 million (FY 2026–27)
- Agency executive: Chuck Hatcher, Director, Division of Recreation and Parks
- Parent agency: Florida Department of Environmental Protection
- Website: www.floridastateparks.org

The Florida Park Service is the state government agency that manages the Florida State Parks system. It is the state parks component of the Division of Recreation and Parks, a division of the Florida Department of Environmental Protection (DEP) that also contains the Office of Greenways and Trails; the Florida Park Service name remains in use for the division's state park operations. The division administers roughly 176 state parks and trails covering nearly 819,000 acres (331,000 ha). Annual attendance regularly exceeds 25 million visitors, and the division has estimated the direct economic impact of the system at more than $3 billion annually.

The service was formally established in 1935 under the Florida Board of Forestry following the arrival of the federal Civilian Conservation Corps (CCC), whose members built the first seven state parks over the next seven years. Under Jim Crow laws, the parks were racially segregated from their inception, and separate facilities for Black visitors were still being built at the end of the 1950s. African-American members of the CCC built many of the original parks in segregated units, but no park was opened specifically for Black visitors until the 1950s. Little Talbot Island State Park, which opened in 1952, had separate beaches for white and Black visitors. An independent Board of Parks and Historic Memorials administered the agency from 1949 to 1969; subsequently, it was integrated into the Department of Natural Resources (DNR) as the Division of Recreation and Parks. In 1993, the DNR merged with the Department of Environmental Regulation to form the Department of Environmental Protection, placing the division under its oversight.

Under the leadership of Ney C. Landrum (1970–1989), the park system doubled in size, and the agency adopted a unit classification system in 1972 that now sorts its holdings into 17 categories. Modern land acquisition has been largely funded through voter-approved bond programs, beginning with Governor Reubin Askew's environmental package in 1972 and continuing through the Conservation and Recreation Lands (CARL) Trust Fund (1979), Preservation 2000 (1990), and Florida Forever (1999). Fran Mainella, who led the division from 1990 to 2001, was subsequently nominated by President George W. Bush to head the National Park Service (NPS), becoming the first woman to hold that position. Volunteers contribute over a million hours annually across the system, coordinated by park-level citizen support organizations and the statewide Florida State Parks Foundation.

Florida is the first state park system to receive the National Recreation and Park Association's National Gold Medal Award four times: in 1999, 2005, 2013, and 2019. The agency has been the subject of periodic controversy over commercial and recreational development inside state parks, most notably a 2011 proposal for a trail of Jack Nicklaus golf courses in state parks and the 2024 "Great Outdoors Initiative." Both were withdrawn after public opposition, which in 2024 was bipartisan. The second episode led to the 2025 State Park Preservation Act, which prohibits golf courses, other sporting facilities, and new lodging in state parks.

== History ==
=== Early preservation efforts ===
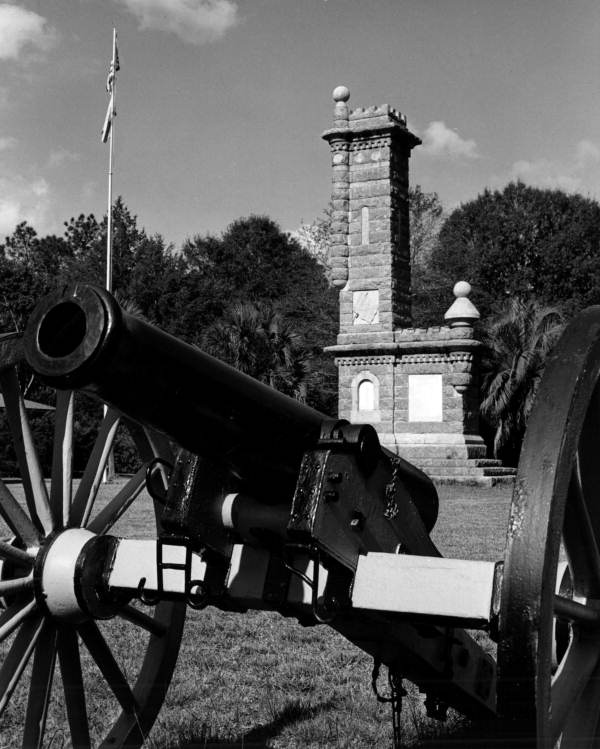
Cannon in front of the memorial at Olustee Battlefield Historic State Park

Florida's involvement in the preservation of public sites for recreation and commemoration precedes the creation of any formal park agency. The state legislature created the Olustee Battle Memorial in 1909 to mark the site of the Battle of Olustee. The 1921 legislature funded four further preservation projects, all of which eventually became state historic sites: monuments at the Natural Bridge and Marianna battlefields, both carried out by chapters of the United Daughters of the Confederacy; a monument at St. Joseph Bay marking the site of the 1838–39 constitutional convention; and the purchase of an 80 acres (32 ha) tract at the site of the Dade battle, to be developed by a temporary Dade Memorial Commission. In 1925, the legislature accepted the donation of the Gamble Mansion in Manatee County, which a chapter of the United Daughters of the Confederacy had bought to save from foreclosure, and appropriated $10,000 to restore it. These sites were looked after by the legislature and by private organizations rather than by any park agency until 1949, when they were transferred to the new Florida Board of Parks and Historic Memorials.

Separate preservation efforts began in 1915, when the Florida Federation of Women's Clubs, led by May Mann Jennings, persuaded the legislature to transfer 960 acres (390 ha) of state land on Paradise Key in the Everglades to the federation for park purposes; the transfer was matched by a comparable donation from the estate of Henry Flagler. The federation formally dedicated Royal Palm State Park on November 23, 1916, with a motorcade of 168 cars carrying more than 1,000 guests. Although never operated by the state, Royal Palm functioned as Florida's first state park in all but name until 1947, when it was turned over to the federal government to become part of Everglades National Park.

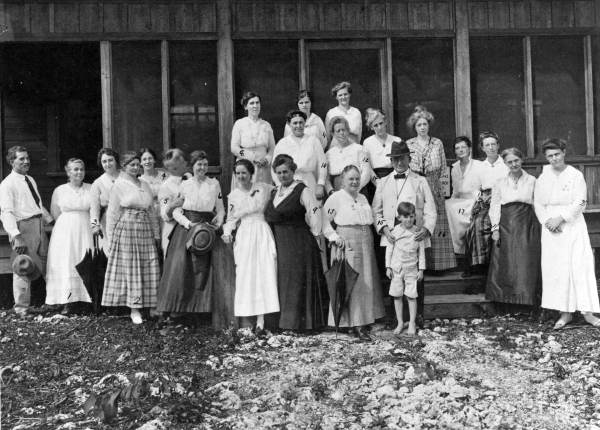
Florida Federation of Women's Clubs meeting at the newly opened Royal Palm State Park lodge

The first attempt at a statewide park system came in 1925, when the legislature enacted a law drafted by the Jacksonville attorney S. Bryan Jennings, the son of May Mann Jennings. It created a "Florida State Park System" to be owned and operated by the Trustees of the Internal Improvement Fund and authorized the Trustees to acquire land for public recreation or for the preservation of natural beauty or historic association. A provision allowing the Trustees to sell state land to pay for the new parks was struck before passage, and the Trustees never acted on the law; a field agent of the National Conference on State Parks who surveyed the state in 1925 and 1926 counted five existing "state parks": Royal Palm, Olustee, Natural Bridge, the Dade memorial, and the Constitution Convention memorial. The system existed only on paper for another decade.

By the 1930s, public interest in state parks had become apparent. Highlands Hammock, a 500 acres (200 ha) tract of virgin subtropical forest near Sebring, was assembled by the Roebling family of New Jersey. Working with the local Tropical Florida Parks Association, they opened the land to the public in 1933. The following year, it was accepted by the state, becoming Florida's first state park upon the Park Service's formal creation in 1935.

=== The CCC era ===
The federal Civilian Conservation Corps, created in 1933 as part of the New Deal, provided the labor and capital to help establish the Florida state park system. Under pressure from CCC director Robert Fechner and President Franklin D. Roosevelt for Florida to share the cost of the work, Governor David Sholtz had the Board of Forestry draft a bill creating a state park service; chief forester Harry Lee Baker warned that Florida could not get its full quota of CCC camps unless the state provided work projects. In 1935, the legislature enacted Chapter 17025, formally creating the Florida Park Service under the Board of Forestry, authorizing it to "establish, develop and maintain a system of state parks" and appropriating $25,000 annually for this purpose. (Note: Chapter 17025, Laws of Florida (1935). The citation is found in Blythe 2017, p. 60 n. 98.) Most of the land the state committed to the new parks was federal grant land that remained uncommitted or property that had reverted to the state through tax forfeiture during the collapse of the 1920s land boom.

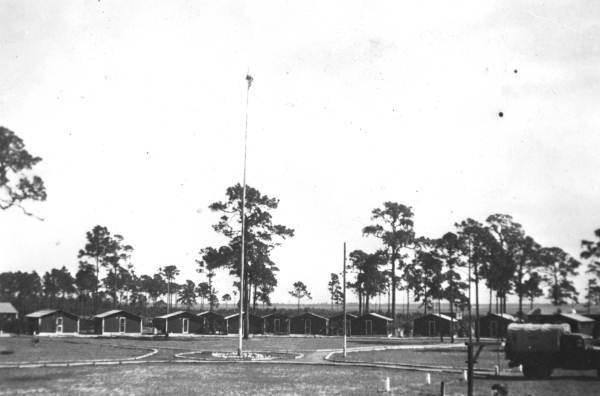
CCC camp for workers at Highlands Hammock State Park

Charles H. Schaeffer served as the first director of the Florida Park Service from 1935 to 1937, followed by former state procurement officer Henry J. Malsberger from 1937 to 1940. By the end of 1935, the agency had established the seven original state parks: Gold Head Branch, Hillsborough River, Myakka River, Florida Caverns, Fort Clinch, Torreya, and Highlands Hammock. According to historian David J. Nelson, the system's first employee was a Highlands Hammock CCC enrollee named Pantzer, who from May 1935 worked as a visitor guide there on weekday afternoons and on Sundays. At these parks, CCC workers under National Park Service supervision built the roads, cabins, bathhouses, picnic shelters, and other visitor infrastructure that allowed the state to open them to the public over the following seven years. (Note: O'Leno State Park is usually listed among the original CCC-built Florida state parks, but it was originally developed jointly by the local Works Progress Administration and a Forestry CCC camp based out of Olustee. The park was not transferred to the Park Service until 1941.) At Royal Palm, work was carried out by CCC Company 262, Camp SP-1, based in Homestead beginning in October 1933 under the supervision of landscape architect William Lyman Phillips of the Olmsted Brothers firm. Nelson has argued that the CCC era built the tourism image of modern Florida.

In 1941, the legislature renamed the Board of Forestry the Florida Board of Forestry and Parks and dropped the requirement that the National Park Service certify the qualifications of the state park director. With the CCC program nearly defunct, the state now had to operate and maintain the parks on its own. By 1941, six of the system's eleven parks were at least partly open to the public, but parks received less than a quarter of the board's appropriation. During World War II the board made parts of several parks, including Gold Head Branch, Myakka River, and Fort Clinch, available for military use, and wartime rationing cut attendance from nearly 85,000 in 1942 to about 52,000 in 1943. A 1945 law placed the Florida Park Service under the board's direct supervision, funded by its own appropriation, so that the park director reported to the board rather than to the state forester.

=== Segregation and race ===
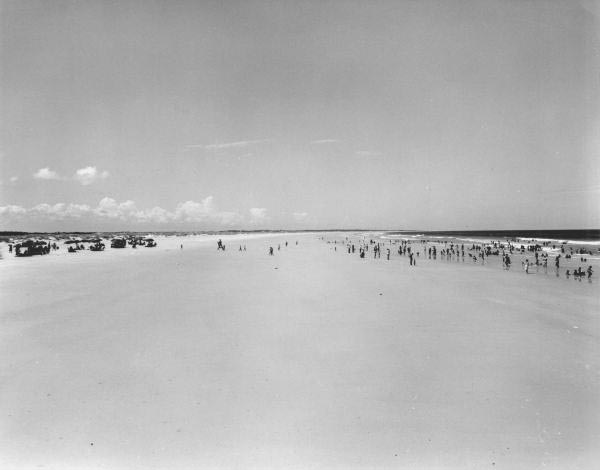
African Americans on the south end of Little Talbot Island State Park

Florida's state parks were racially segregated from their inception. African-American CCC enrollees were placed in segregated companies and worked on many of the earliest parks in the state. Company 5480 built parts of Myakka River State Park, while other companies were sent to Torreya State Park and Florida Caverns State Park. Local white communities often opposed the placement of African-American CCC camps near their towns.

Despite this work, no state park was opened specifically for African-American visitors until the 1950s. Little Talbot Island State Park opened in 1952 with two beaches and two entrances, North Beach for white visitors and South Beach for African Americans, and South Little Talbot Island and St. Andrews State Park were among the parks the Park Service opened for Black visitors during the decade. In larger parks, particularly those with beaches, the Board of Forestry and Parks generally provided separate facilities for Black visitors, though this was not practical at every park; at the proposed Santa Rosa State Park it set aside an area for a segregated Scout camp beside the separate swimming beach. The board was less willing to allow mixed use; a request to hold an interracial outing at the camp facilities at O'Leno was denied.

Segregation was still explicit in the park system's public-facing operations at the end of the 1950s. The board's 1957–1959 Biennial Report described North Little Talbot Island State Park as being "for White people" and South Little Talbot Island State Park, on the same barrier island, as "for Colored people," and reported separate construction, including fishing piers, combination buildings, and ranger residences, in the "Colored Area" of parks including St. Andrews, Tomoka, and Jim Woodruff. Other units, Magnolia Lake State Park and North Suwannee River State Park, were designated wholly for African-American use. The legislature funded the arrangement directly: capital outlay appropriations for the Board of Parks and Historic Memorials in 1957 listed separate items for "white" and "colored" areas at Jim Woodruff State Park alongside new African-American areas at Butler Beach and John C. Beasley Memorial Park.

=== Postwar expansion ===
In 1946, at the urging of Florida Historical Society president Karl A. Bickel and with the support of Governor Millard Caldwell, the Park Service hired the state's first staff archaeologist, John W. Griffin, whose responsibilities covered archaeological sites throughout Florida and not only those in state parks. The Madira Bickel Mound, donated in 1948, was the first site acquired by the system primarily for its archaeological significance.

Dissatisfied with the state's forestry-dominated park program, state senator and later governor LeRoy Collins secured a 1947 concurrent resolution creating a joint Senate–House committee, which he chaired, to survey Florida's state parks and monuments and report a program to the 1949 legislature. Bills drawn from the committee's work passed both houses in 1949 and took effect on July 1, separating parks from the Board of Forestry and creating the Florida Board of Parks and Historic Memorials. The new agency was governed by five citizen members appointed by the governor to staggered four-year terms, one from each of five multi-county regions; the board hired a director of state parks, appointed a five-member advisory council for each unit, and received its appropriations and park revenues through a state park trust fund. Governor Fuller Warren appointed the first board in July 1949; its chairman, Miami Herald associate editor John D. Pennekamp, became the central figure in the park program over the board's first two years. When the law took effect, seven historic memorials, among them the Olustee and Dade battlefields and the Gamble Mansion, were added to the twenty-five park units already in the system, bringing parks and historic sites together in a single program.

A fire tower that once stood at Highlands Hammock

The next decade began with a conflict between the board and Lewis G. Scoggin, director since 1940, over staffing and his policy of keeping the parks as close to their natural state as possible. The board dismissed Scoggin in August 1952 and appointed Walter Coldwell as acting director; Coldwell organized the system into its first four field districts before the board named Emmet L. Hill director in January 1953. Under Hill (1953 to 1960), average general revenue appropriations for park operations nearly tripled, and average annual attendance rose from about 680,000 to about 2.6 million. An appropriation of $465,405 in 1953 enabled the Park Service to pave roads in 13 state parks.

During the late 1950s, a wildfire at Highlands Hammock State Park was stopped short of the park's old-growth hammock by a combined response from park staff, the Florida Forest Service, the Florida National Guard, and citizens of several counties. The fire prompted the Park Service, the Forest Service, and Highlands County to establish a countywide fire prevention, detection, and suppression system.

The Outdoor Recreation and Conservation Act of 1963 established the Land Acquisition Trust Fund to acquire park land on a systematic basis; N. E. "Bill" Miller served as director throughout the fund's early years, from 1963 to 1970. By 1963, the 75,869 acres (30,703 ha) acquired for state parks had cost the state only $346,000 in cash, most of the land having come through donation and transfer. Between the fund's creation and mid-1969, 13 additional properties were bought or designated for purchase at an aggregate cost of about $28 million, nine of them in central and south Florida.

=== The Division of Recreation and Parks ===
A statewide executive reorganization in 1969 merged the Board of Parks and Historic Memorials and the Outdoor Recreation Development Council into the Division of Recreation and Parks housed within the newly created Department of Natural Resources (DNR). As a result of this reorganization, the Park Service ceased to be an independent agency. The Florida Park Service name remains in use for the division's state park operations; the division also contains the Office of Greenways and Trails.

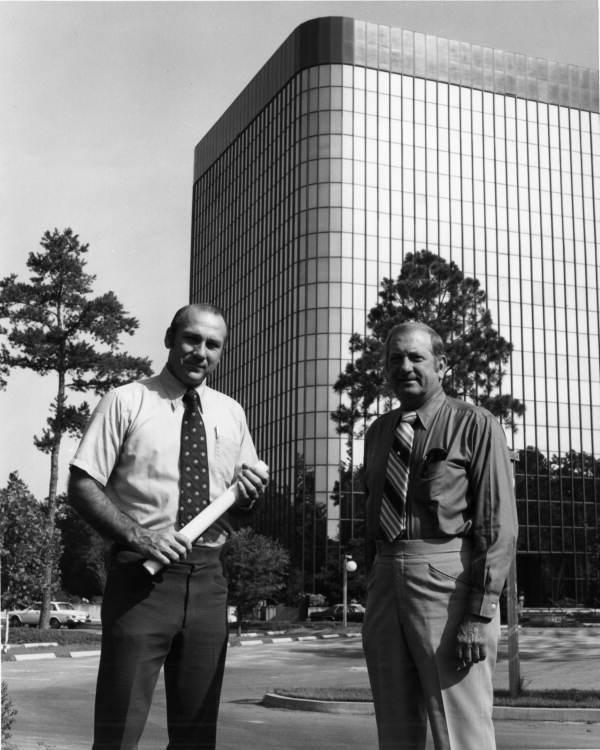
Florida Department of Natural Resources director Harmon Shields with assistant director Don Duden in front of the DNR's new headquarters, the Marjory Stoneman Douglas building

Ney C. Landrum, who served as director from 1970 to 1989, helped the Florida Park Service gain national recognition. During his tenure, the state park program doubled in size and its management was placed on a professional basis. A unit classification system adopted in 1972 recognized the distinctions among park properties; the park system now sorts its units into 17 classifications, the largest being state parks, state recreation areas, and state preserves. After Landrum's retirement, Governor Bob Martinez and the Florida Cabinet designated him Director Emeritus of Florida State Parks, and he later received the United States Department of the Interior Conservation Service Award. Landrum went on to serve as executive director of the National Association of State Park Directors from 1989 until his second retirement in 1997.

Two major acquisition programs added significantly to the park system during Landrum's tenure. Governor Reubin Askew's 1972 environmental package, which included the Environmental Land and Water Management Act, the Water Resources Act, the Land Conservation Act, and the State Comprehensive Planning Act, established the borrowing mechanism for endangered lands and recreation lands; voters approved the $240 million general obligation bond authorization in November 1972. The Conservation and Recreation Lands (CARL) Trust Fund was established in 1979.

Under Governor Bob Graham, the state launched the Save Our Coasts (1981), Save Our Rivers (1982), and Save Our Everglades (1983) programs; during Graham's two terms, Florida brought more environmentally endangered lands into public ownership than any other state. The Preservation 2000 program, proposed by Governor Bob Martinez in response to a 1990 blue-ribbon commission report and enacted the same year, issued $300 million in general obligation bonds annually for a decade, backed by the documentary stamp tax. By the year 2000, the program had funded the acquisition of 1.25 million acres (510,000 ha) of Florida land.

=== The Department of Environmental Protection ===
The Florida Environmental Reorganization Act of 1993 merged the Department of Natural Resources with the Department of Environmental Regulation to form the Florida Department of Environmental Protection, effective July 1, 1993. The Division of Recreation and Parks was placed under the new department, where it remains as of 2026.

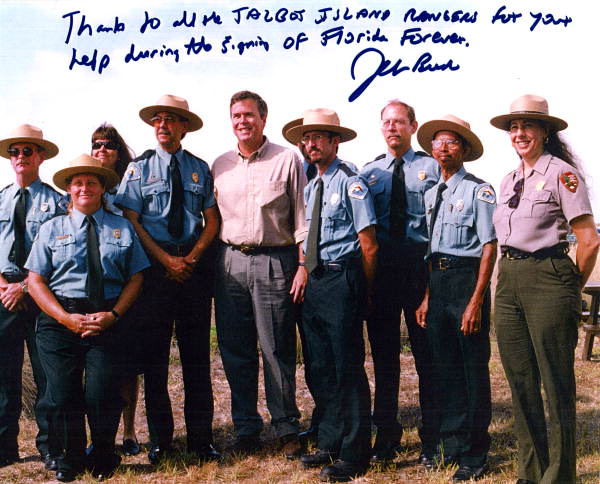
Governor Jeb Bush with park staff at Little Talbot Island State Park during the signing of the Florida Forever bill in Jacksonville, Florida

Fran Mainella led the division from 1990 to 2001, a period during which additional land acquisition programs, notably Florida Forever, enacted in 1999 as a successor to Preservation 2000, continued to expand the system. In June 2001, President George W. Bush nominated Mainella to lead the National Park Service, and upon her confirmation the following month she became the 16th director of the NPS

and the first woman to hold that post.[59]

After Mainella's move to the National Park Service, the division went through several directors, including Wendy Spencer (2001 to 2003), Mike Bullock (2003 to 2010), Donald Forgione (2010 to 2016), Lisa Edgar in an interim capacity in 2017, Eric Draper (2017 to 2021), and Chuck Hatcher (2021 to present). Draper had previously spent more than two decades at Audubon Florida, the last eight as its executive director. As director, Draper identified climate change as a major threat to the park system, particularly its coastal parks.

== Organization ==
=== Central office and programs ===
The Division of Recreation and Parks comprises the Florida Park Service, which operates the state parks, and the Office of Greenways and Trails, which provides statewide coordination for the Florida Greenways and Trails System under the Florida Greenways and Trails Act. Several central office units support the parks: the Office of Park Planning prepares unit management plans and maintains statewide inventories of park assets and outdoor recreation resources; the Bureau of Natural and Cultural Resources provides technical services for natural and cultural resource management; the Bureau of Design and Construction provides design, contract administration, and construction management; and a land acquisition program identifies and ranks properties proposed for addition to the park system. The division also prepares Florida's statewide comprehensive outdoor recreation plan, which must be updated every five years for the state to remain eligible for federal Land and Water Conservation Fund money.

=== Districts ===
The Division of Recreation and Parks is one of several divisions of the Florida Department of Environmental Protection and is headquartered in Tallahassee. It is led by a division director appointed by the Secretary of Environmental Protection; Chuck Hatcher has held the position since 2021.

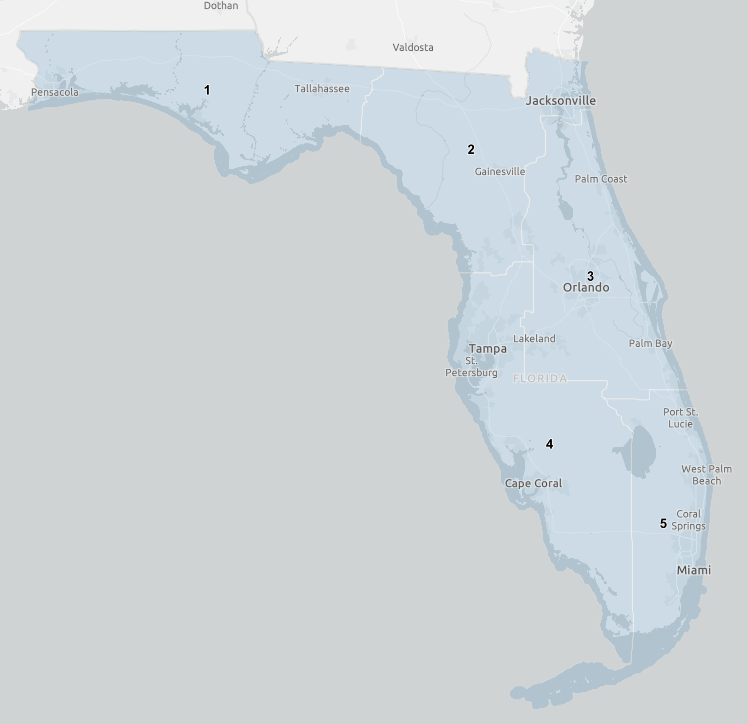
Map of the Florida Park Service field districts

The district system dates to 1952, when the Park Service first divided its parks into four districts. For field administration, the state is now divided into five park districts.

Florida state park units by administrative district, as of July 1, 2026
District	Region	Units	Area (acres)	Average unit size (acres)
1	Panhandle and west Florida	37	71,476	1,932
2	North central Florida, Nature Coast	46	138,202	3,004
3	East-central and east coast Florida	33	257,006	7,788
4	West-central and southwest Florida	36	239,295	6,647
5	Southeast Florida and the Florida Keys	24	113,437	4,727
Total	Statewide	176	819,417 (Note: The July 2026 jurisdiction report gives two different totals: its covering memo states that the 176 units total 819,476.74 acres (331,630.47 ha), while the per-district chart totals 819,416.74 acres.)	4,656

=== Park system ===
As of July 2026, the Florida Park Service manages roughly 176 units on approximately 819,000 acres (331,000 ha). Reported annual attendance regularly exceeds 25 million visitors, and the division has estimated the direct economic impact of the system at more than $3 billion annually.

The division groups its units into 17 classifications. State parks, state recreation areas, and state preserves together account for about two-thirds of the system, while the remainder range from state trails and historic sites to single-unit classes such as the state's only wildlife park and folk culture center.

Florida state park units by classification, as of July 1, 2026
Classification	Units	Percent
State Park	57	32.2%
State Recreation Area	34	19.2%
State Preserve	28	15.8%
Historic Site	21	11.9%
State Trail	10	5.6%
State Museum	5	2.8%
Archaeological Site	5	2.8%
Ornamental Garden	4	2.3%
State Reserve	2	1.1%
Botanical Site	2	1.1%
Geological Site	2	1.1%
Fishing Pier	2	1.1%
Cultural Site	1	0.6%
State Greenway	1	0.6%
Folk Culture Center	1	0.6%
Wildlife Park	1	0.6%
Undetermined	1	0.6%
Total	177 (Note: The classification counts sum to 177 rather than the system's 176 units because Ichetucknee Trace lacks an official state park status and a normative title in the jurisdiction report. It is included here only because it is managed by the Florida Park Service.)	100%

Land acquisition for the system is funded primarily through the Florida Forever program, which succeeded Preservation 2000 in 1999, together with general revenue and Land Acquisition Trust Fund appropriations. Visitor entrance fees make the park system, in most years, substantially self-supporting from operating revenue.

=== Directors ===
Directors of the Florida Park Service and its predecessors
Director	Tenure	Notes
Charles H. Schaeffer	1935 to 1937	First director
Henry J. Malsberger	1937 to 1940	
Lewis G. Scoggin	1940 to 1952	
Walter A. Coldwell	1952 to 1953	Acting
Emmet L. Hill	1953 to 1960	
Walter A. Coldwell	1960 to 1963	
N. E. "Bill" Miller	1963 to 1970	
Ney C. Landrum	1970 to 1989	
Joseph F. Knoll	1990	Acting
Fran P. Mainella	1990 to 2001	Later director of the National Park Service
Wendy Spencer	2001 to 2003	
Mike Bullock	2003 to 2010	
Donald Forgione	2010 to 2016	
Lisa Edgar	2017	Interim
Eric Draper	2017 to 2021	
Chuck Hatcher	2021 to present	

=== Funding ===
For fiscal year 2026–27, the Florida Legislature approved $253.7 million for state park operations. Of this total, $22.5 million came from general revenue and $231.3 million from trust funds, including the Land Acquisition Trust Fund and the state park trust fund. The largest allocations were $73.2 million for employee salaries, $44.5 million for park facility improvements, $17.8 million for disaster emergency repairs, and $15 million for the federal Land and Water Conservation Fund pass-through.

== Management ==
=== Unit management plans ===
Florida law requires the manager of each parcel of state conservation land to submit a land management plan at least every ten years, and the division's Office of Park Planning prepares a unit management plan for every state park and trail, covering resource management, land use, and implementation. Draft plans are reviewed by an advisory group drawn from local officials, state agencies, adjacent landowners, conservation organizations, and park citizen support organizations, and at least one public hearing is held in an affected county. The draft is then transmitted to the Acquisition and Restoration Council, which reviews it and recommends approval on behalf of the Board of Trustees of the Internal Improvement Trust Fund.

=== Cultural resources ===
Preservation sign at Orman House Historic State Park

Ground-disturbing work on state lands requires review by the Florida Department of State's Division of Historical Resources, whose Public Lands Archaeology program has conducted cultural resource surveys for the Park Service and other state land managers since 1989, records sites in the Florida Master Site File, and reviews management plans. Restoration and interpretation projects are funded through the division's own budget and through grants from the Division of Historical Resources; work completed in fiscal year 2024–25 included the rehabilitation of the Orman House and the construction of a full-scale replica of the 1738 fort at Fort Mose Historic State Park. The division also maintains a central collections facility for accessioned historical objects.

=== Natural resources ===
The Park Service has used prescribed fire to maintain fire-dependent natural communities since 1970; the area of park land classified as fire-type grew from about 89,000 acres (36,000 ha) in 1986 to more than 235,000 acres (95,000 ha) by 2003, while the proportion actually burned lagged behind the acreage proposed. Burns are carried out under authorizations issued by the Florida Forest Service. In fiscal year 2024–25 the division burned 66,398 acres (26,870 ha) across 70 parks and carried out mechanical fuel reduction, hand clearing, and roller chopping for natural community restoration. Invasive plant treatments covered 8,909 acres (3,605 ha) spread over 44,752 acres (18,110 ha), with surveys or treatments on more than 80 percent of division lands, and hydrological restoration projects at 16 parks affected 3,040 acres (1,230 ha) of wetland and aquatic habitat. Imperiled species work in the same year included daily sea turtle nesting surveys at 40 coastal parks, monitoring of ground-nesting seabirds and shorebirds at 46 coastal units, and surveys that identified 158 Florida scrub jay groups across 12 parks.

=== Visitor services ===
More than 28 million people visited the state parks and trails in fiscal year 2024–25, generating over $75 million in revenue from user fees and concessions; attendance has grown from 14.6 million in 1999, and revenue from $25.6 million over the same period. Reservations for camping and cabins are administered through a statewide central reservation system.

== Volunteers ==
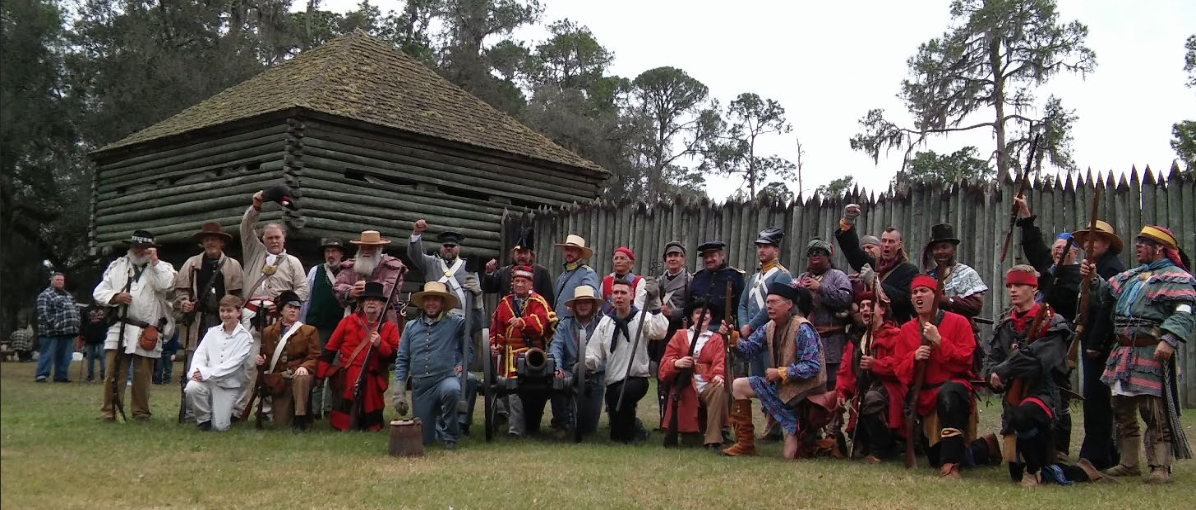
Volunteers in period clothing for living history interpretation at Fort Foster State Historic Site

Volunteers make up a substantial portion of the Florida Park Service's workforce, providing more than one million volunteer hours annually across the system. The service's volunteer program includes individual park volunteers, campground hosts, and organized Citizen Support Organizations (CSOs) that operate at both individual parks and statewide. All volunteers, regardless of program, are eligible for awards at service-hour milestones, including pins, certificates, and park passes.

=== Individuals and campground hosts ===
Individual volunteers assist rangers with visitor services, interpretive programming, resource management, and campground operations. The Park Service maintains a statewide volunteer portal that lets volunteers apply, log hours, and coordinate with park staff. Long-term "campground host" volunteers can live on-site at their assigned park for extended stays, with site fees and utilities waived in exchange for their volunteer work, providing an evening staff presence at parks after regular ranger hours.

=== Citizen Support Organizations ===
Citizen Support Organizations (CSOs), also known as "Friends" groups, are independent 501(c)(3) nonprofit corporations authorized to raise funds and coordinate volunteer activity on behalf of state parks. Most Florida state parks are supported by an affiliated CSO. Each CSO operates under a written partnership agreement with the Department of Environmental Protection and is required to submit an annual report on its activities and finances to the department, which compiles the reports into a system-wide report. The DEP sets standards for CSOs at Florida state parks through its Citizen Support Organization Handbook.

=== Florida State Parks Foundation ===
The Florida State Parks Foundation serves as the statewide CSO for the entire park system. Established on November 12, 1993, at Wekiwa Springs State Park as the Friends of Florida State Parks, it was renamed the Florida State Parks Foundation in 2018. The organization provides fundraising, advocacy, and support services to individual park-level CSOs, and administers a Park Impact Grants program that distributes funding to local Friends groups. The foundation reports supporting more than 20,000 park volunteers across the system.

== Recognition ==
The Florida State Parks system received the National Recreation and Park Association's National Gold Medal Award for Excellence in Park and Recreation Management in 1999, 2005, 2013, and 2019. The 2019 award made Florida the first state park system in the United States to receive the honor four times.

== Controversies ==
=== 1957 mining proposal ===
In February and October 1956, the New York and Honduras Rosario Mining Company offered to lease part of Little Talbot Island State Park to mine ilmenite and other heavy minerals, proposing a royalty of one dollar per gross ton, a minimum of $25,000 a year, and a term of twenty years. The Board of Parks and Historic Memorials rejected both offers. On May 28, 1957, the Florida Senate adopted a concurrent resolution urging the board to reconsider and enter into such a lease, asserting that the park was not accessible to the public and was unlikely to become so, that the company would restore and landscape the site afterwards, and that mining would bring employment and industrial expansion to the area at a time when the board was seeking large appropriations from the state. The House of Representatives indefinitely postponed the resolution on June 8, 1957, the last day of the session, and it was never adopted.

=== 2011 golf course proposal ===
In early 2011, at the direction of Governor Rick Scott, two legislators introduced bills requiring the DEP to hire professional golfer Jack Nicklaus to build golf courses, which could include hotels, in state parks in every region of the state; the House version named Jonathan Dickinson State Park as the site of one course. The proposed trail was modeled after the Robert Trent Jones Golf Trail in Alabama. The bills drew criticism from environmental groups and newspaper columnists and were withdrawn one week after they were introduced; state representative Patrick Rooney, who had introduced the legislation, told reporters that "Floridians spoke very clearly" against the plan.

=== 2024 Great Outdoors Initiative ===
On August 19, 2024, the Department of Environmental Protection announced the "2024–25 Great Outdoors Initiative," a proposal to add golf courses, pickleball courts, disc golf courses, and lodging at nine state parks, including Anastasia, Honeymoon Island, Topsail Hill Preserve, and Jonathan Dickinson. The plan generated bipartisan opposition, including from Republican U.S. senators Marco Rubio and Rick Scott, and prompted protests at multiple parks. Reporting later showed that Park Service staff and the public had not been consulted before the announcement.

On August 28, 2024, Governor Ron DeSantis announced that the initiative was "going back to the drawing board" and stated, "We're not getting into the golf course business in the state of Florida." The department subsequently withdrew all remaining proposals. Following the episode, legislators from both parties filed measures intended to restrict future non-conservation development inside state parks. The resulting State Park Preservation Act (CS/CS/HB 209), sponsored by Representatives John Snyder and Peggy Gossett-Seidman, passed the House 115 to 0 and the Senate 37 to 0, and DeSantis signed it on May 22, 2025. Effective July 1, 2025, the act bars golf courses, tennis courts, pickleball courts, ball fields, and other sporting facilities from state parks and prohibits new lodging establishments, while allowing campsites and cabins sited to avoid harm to park resources; existing facilities may continue to operate. It also requires that the management plan for every state park be developed with input from an advisory group that holds at least one public hearing, and it renamed St. Marks River Preserve State Park as Ney Landrum State Park for the former director.
