= David Vela =

American park administrator

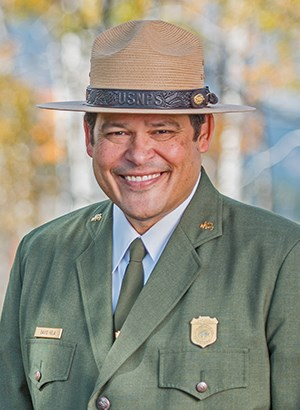

Acting Director of the National Park Service
- In office October 1, 2019 – August 7, 2020
- Preceded by: P. Daniel Smith (Acting)
- Succeeded by: Margaret Everson (Acting)

Raymond David Vela is a parks administrator who is the former acting director of the United States National Park Service.

== Early life and education ==
Vela grew up in Wharton, Texas. At a Senate hearing, he described himself as the oldest grandchild of a sharecropper.

He graduated from Texas A&M University with a degree in recreational parks and tourism sciences in 1982.

== Career ==
Vela is the former superintendent of Grand Teton National Park in Wyoming. He has also worked as the National Park Service's director for workforce and inclusion; director of the National Park Service Southeast region; and superintendent of the George Washington Memorial Parkway, Palo Alto Battlefield National Historic Site and Lyndon B. Johnson National Historical Park.

He has held other positions at San Antonio Missions National Historical Park in Texas, Appomattox Court House National Historical Park in Virginia; Independence National Historical Park in Philadelphia, Pennsylvania.

== National Park Service acting director ==
President Donald Trump first nominated Vela as director of the National Park Service in 2018. The Senate Energy and Natural Resources Committee voted to advance Vela's nomination in 2018, but he was never confirmed by the Senate. Vela joined the National Park Service's Washington office as acting deputy director of operations. In September 2019, Interior Secretary David Bernhardt announced that he was promoting Vela to director on an acting basis.

Vela is the first Latino to lead the National Park Service.

In May 2020, two activist groups, Public Employees for Environmental Responsibility and the Western Watersheds Project, sued over Bernhardt's ongoing interim appointments of Vela to run the National Park service and William Perry Pendley to run the Bureau of Land Management, which bypassed Senate confirmation.

In June 2020, Vela announced that the Trump administration would end a five-year-old ban on certain hunting practices in Alaska. The rule change will allow hunters to bait hibernating bears from their dens, kill wolf mothers and pups in their dens, shoot swimming caribou from a boat, and target animals from airplanes and snowmobiles.

Vela campaigned for the Great American Outdoors Act, passed by Congress and signed by Trump on August 4, 2020. The law allocates billions of dollars to improve park maintenance.

Vela announced on August 7, 2020, that he would retire in September 2020. He was replaced by Margaret Everson.

== Personal ==
Vela is married and has a daughter and a son.

== See also ==
- National Park Service
- Organization of the National Park Service
