= Jessica Bowron =

Director of the US National Park Service

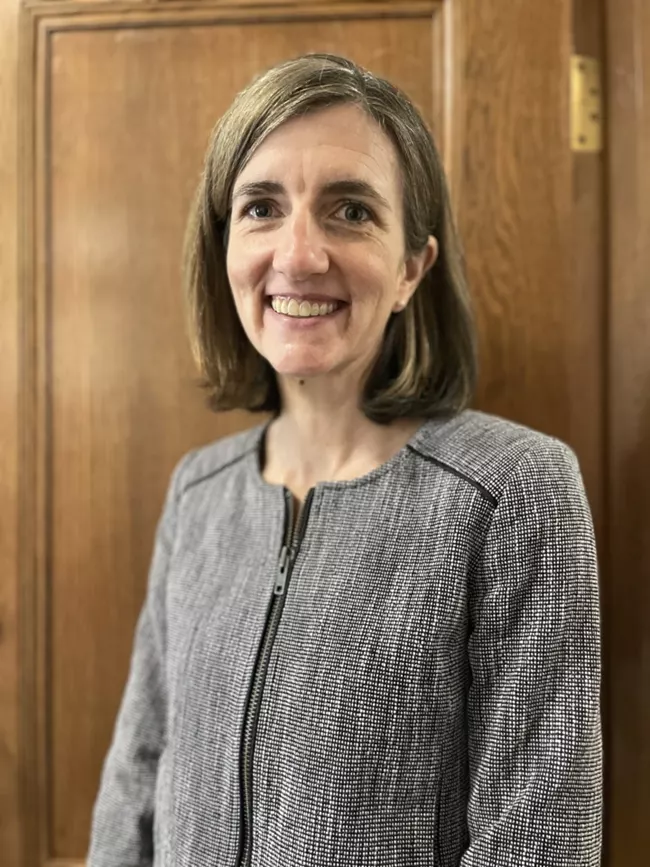

Director of the National Park Service
- Acting
- Assumed office January 20, 2025
- President: Donald Trump
- Preceded by: Charles Sams

Jessica Bowron is the current acting director of the United States National Park Service.

Bowron received an undergraduate degree in natural resource economics from Oregon State University in 2004, and she earned her masters degree in 2007 at the University of Arizona.

She joined the National Park Service in 2007 as a budget analyst through the Presidential Management Fellow program. She served as a comptroller since 2017 until her appointment in January 2025.

In spring 2025, Bowron issued a directive to park leaders encouraging them to temporarily reassign rangers from other parks, rely on volunteers, and coordinate with state governments to maintain core operations ahead of the summer season.

In December 2025, following a Trump administration directive, the Pride flag was removed from Manhattan’s Stonewall National Monument. The removal sparked local protests at the historic site, which is considered the symbolic birthplace of the LGBTQ rights movement. Bowron wrote a memo in November 2025 that all national parks must review their retail items and remove by December 19 any that promote diversity, equity, and inclusion or gender expression.

A memorandum indicating it was digitally signed by Bowron in January 2026 was issued regarding "Guidance on the Display and Flying of Non-Agency Flags and Pennants within the National Park System."

== See also ==
- Director of the National Park Service
- History of the National Park Service
- Organization of the National Park Service

Government offices
Preceded by Charles Sams	Director of the National Park Service (Acting); 2025–present	Succeeded by Incumbent
