= Mary A. Bomar =

U.S. National Park Service director (1944–2022)

Mary Bomar
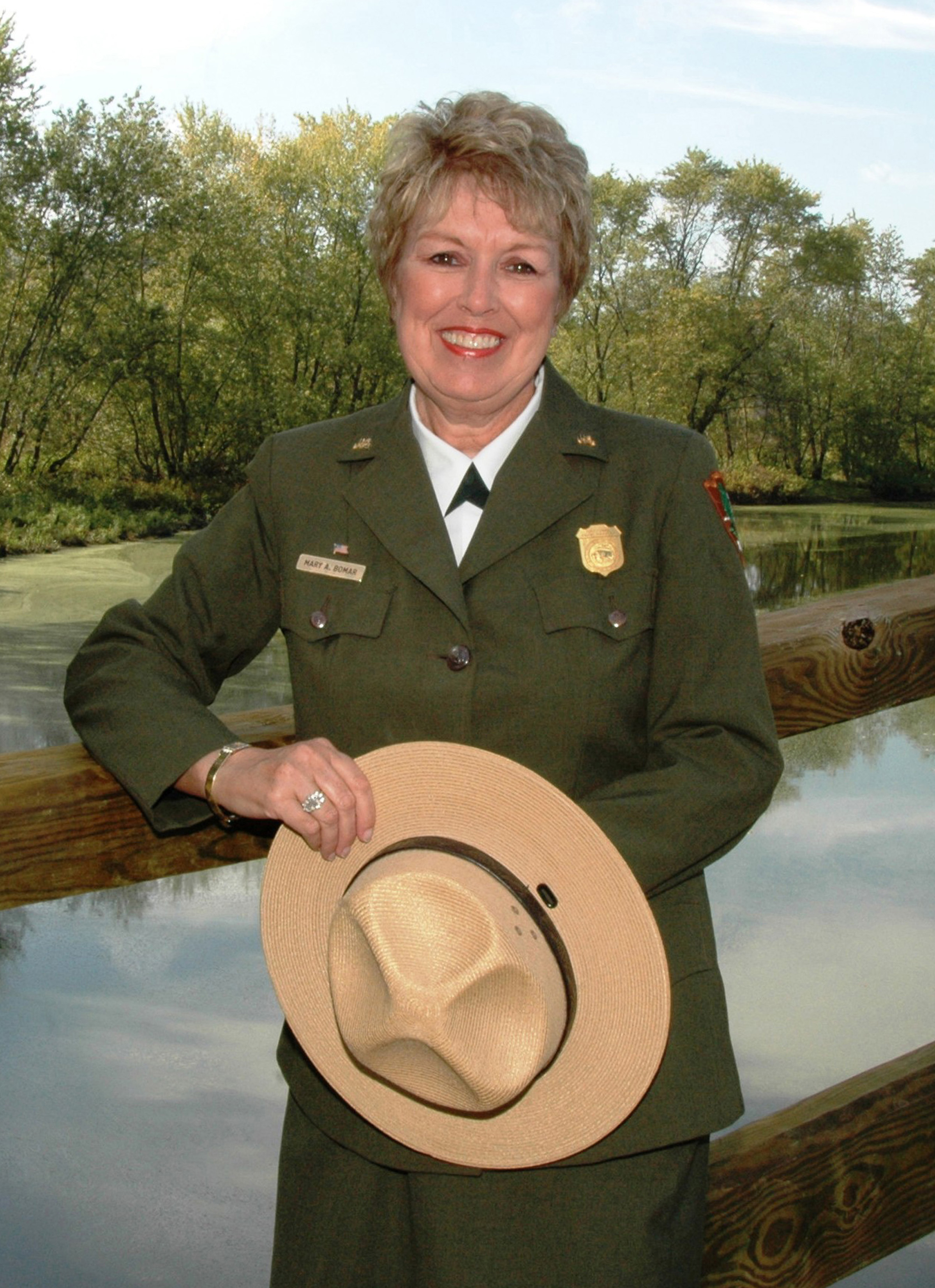

17th Director of the National Park Service
- In office October 17, 2006 – January 20, 2009
- President: George W. Bush
- Preceded by: Fran P. Mainella
- Succeeded by: Jonathan Jarvis

Personal details
- Born: June 30, 1944
- Died: August 28, 2022 (aged 78)

Mary Amelia Bomar (June 30, 1944 – August 28, 2022) was the 17th Director of the National Park Service of the United States.

== Early life and education ==
Raised in Leicester, England, United Kingdom. Bomar became a U.S. citizen in 1977. Bomar died on August 28, 2022. Flags at all sites operated by the National Park Service were flown at half-staff in her honor on September 8, 2022.

== Career ==
From 2003 to 2005, Bomar was superintendent of Independence National Historical Park, and previously superintendent at Oklahoma City National Memorial. Later she served as the Regional Director for the Park Service's Northeast Region.

On September 5, 2006, Bomar was nominated by George W. Bush as the Director of the National Park Service, succeeding Fran P. Mainella. Following Senate confirmation, she was sworn into office on October 17, 2006, by United States Secretary of the Interior Dirk Kempthorne at Independence Square in Philadelphia, Pennsylvania.

She retired from federal service on January 20, 2009.

== See also ==
- National Park Service

Government offices
Preceded by Fran P. Mainella	Director of the National Park Service; 2006 – 2009	Succeeded by Jonathan Jarvis
