= Ney Landrum State Park =

State park in Florida, United States

- IUCN category IV (habitat/species management area)
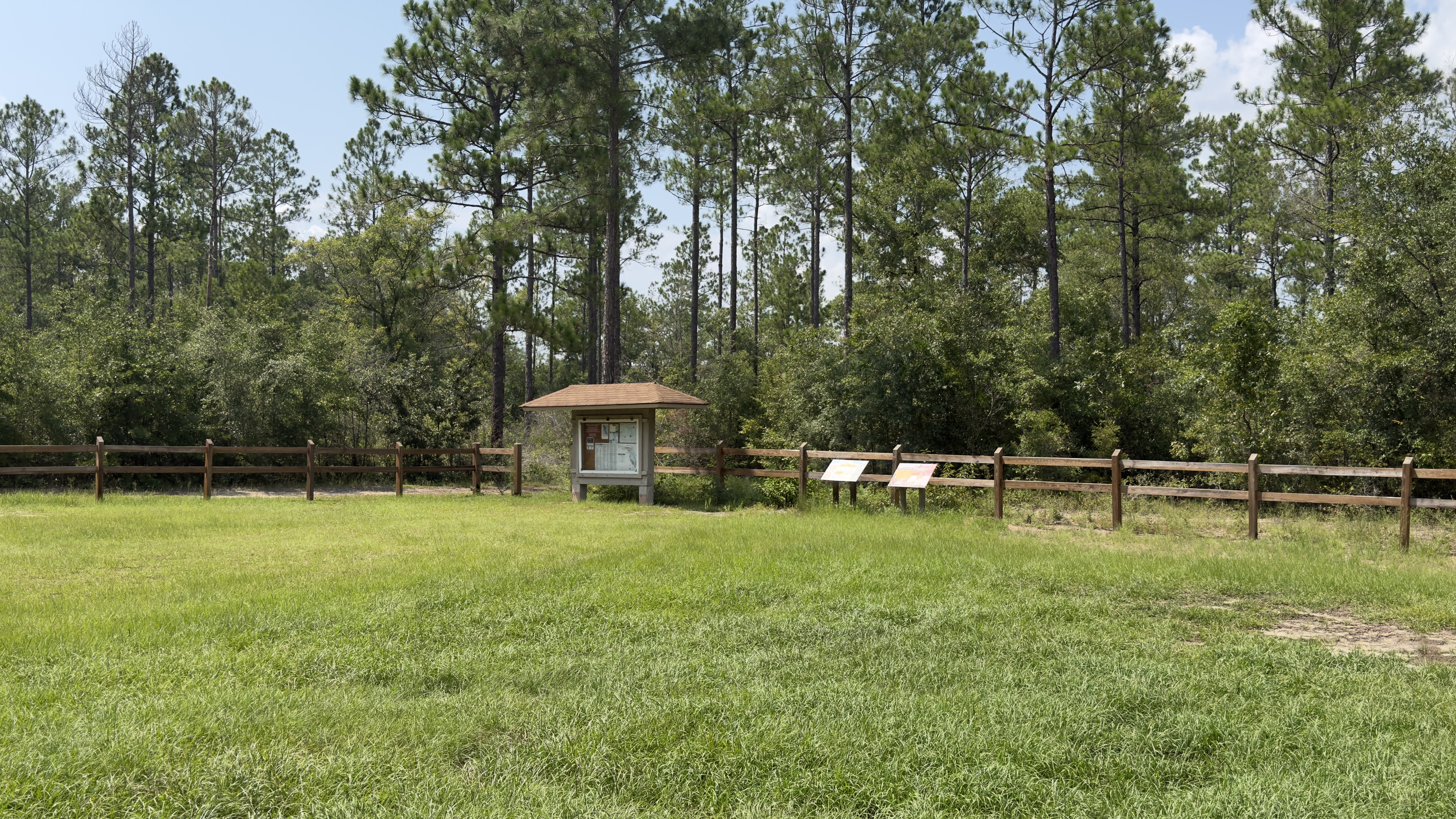
- The parking lot and trailhead

- Location within Florida Location within the United States
- Interactive map of Ney Landrum State Park
- Location: Leon and Jefferson counties, Florida, US
- Nearest city: Tallahassee
- Coordinates: 30°23′33″N 84°05′06″W
- Area: 2,590.01 acres (1,048.14 ha)
- Established: 2007; 19 years ago
- Governing body: Florida Department of Environmental Protection
- Website: https://www.floridastateparks.org/parks-and-trails/ney-landrum-state-park

Ney Landrum State Park, known until 2025 as St. Marks River Preserve State Park, is a 2,590-acre (1,050 ha) Florida state park on the upper St. Marks River, about 10 miles (16 km) east of Tallahassee in Leon and Jefferson counties. The park occupies a band of floodplain, flatwoods and sandhill between U.S. Highway 27 on the north and Tram Road on the south, and is managed by the Division of Recreation and Parks of the Florida Department of Environmental Protection (DEP).

The Board of Trustees of the Internal Improvement Trust Fund bought the land in 2006 from the St. Joe Timberland Company of Delaware for $10,617,647 through the Florida Forever program, as the first phase of the Upper St. Marks River Corridor project. The purchase was intended to buffer the river from development, protect the water quality of the river and of Apalachee Bay, and help link conservation lands in a wildlife corridor running from Tallahassee to the Gulf of Mexico. The park opened to visitors in 2007 as the 161st unit of the state park system.

Because most of the uplands were managed as commercial pine timberland for roughly six decades before the state bought them, the park is classified as a state preserve and is managed primarily for restoration rather than for intensive recreation. It has no on-site staff, and facilities are limited to a trailhead off Tram Road and about 7 miles (11 km) of multi-use trails on former forest roads. In 2025 the Florida Legislature renamed the park for Ney Landrum, director of the Florida Park Service from 1970 to 1989.

== Name ==
In 2025 the Florida Legislature passed CS/CS/HB 209, the State Park Preservation Act, a measure prompted by the withdrawn 2024–2025 Great Outdoors Initiative. Under that initiative, announced by DEP in August 2024, the department had proposed an 18-hole golf course, lodges of up to 350 rooms, pickleball courts and disc golf courses at nine state parks; the plans were withdrawn after strong bipartisan opposition. The act bars sporting facilities and lodging establishments from state parks and requires that parks be managed for conservation-based recreational uses. Section 5 of the act redesignated St. Marks River Preserve State Park, in Leon and Jefferson counties, as Ney Landrum State Park. The bill passed the House 112–0, was approved by the governor on May 22, 2025, as chapter 2025-76, Laws of Florida, and took effect on July 1, 2025.

Ney Cody Landrum (January 17, 1931 – July 12, 2017), described in the bill analysis as the father of the modern Florida park service, was born in Levy County, Florida, moved to Tallahassee as a small child and was educated at Florida State University, where he took a master's degree after serving as a United States Marine Corps officer during the Korean War. He was appointed director of Florida State Parks in 1970 and held the post until his retirement in 1989, a period in which the park system grew into one of the largest in the country and its administration was professionalized. After retiring he served as the first executive director of the National Association of State Park Directors and wrote The State Park Movement in America: A Critical Review (2004), a history of state parks in the United States. The Governor and Cabinet conferred on him the title Director Emeritus of Florida State Parks, and he was inducted into the Florida Tourism Hall of Fame in 2011.

== History ==
=== Early inhabitants ===
A regional overview prepared for the park's management plan concluded that the area has been used more or less continuously for thousands of years, with a possible brief lull after the destruction of the Apalachee missions in 1704 and before Creek migration from Georgia began a few years later. Highly significant Paleoindian sites have been recorded a few miles away near the spring-fed Aucilla and Wacissa rivers and at Wakulla Springs.

Park staff have recorded five historic-period archaeological sites inside the park, recorded in the Florida Master Site File under such names as Otter Spring Bridges and The Crossing. All appear to be former bridge sites or scatters of historic artifacts associated with crossing points on the St. Marks River; one includes squared timbers apparently placed deliberately in the riverbed. All were in good condition, and none had been evaluated for National Register of Historic Places significance as of 2011. No historic structures have been recorded in the park.

Nine further sites recorded in the Florida Master Site File lie on the park's immediate borders and may extend into it; most are small artifact scatters that probably represent short-term campsites and that cannot be assigned to a cultural period for want of diagnostic pottery or stone tools. Two were initially recorded as indeterminate scatters not eligible for the National Register, but Phase II investigations by R. Christopher Goodwin and Associates in 2009 found an intact paleosurface at one, likely dating to the Early Archaic or Paleoindian period, and a comparable paleosurface at the other; both were subsequently determined eligible under Criterion D. Five of the nine were determined ineligible and two were left unevaluated, among them the Castro site, recorded by archaeologist Calvin Jones in 1968 as a historic-period Native American site of the Leon-Jefferson period; Jones suggested it might be the site of the Spanish mission Assumption del Puerto, though no diagnostic mission-period artifacts were found. A further site 250 metres (820 ft) outside the park, with components ranging from the Paleoindian period to the twentieth century, is considered National Register eligible, and the management plan treats it as an indication of what may survive within the park.

Only one location inside the park has been tested below the surface, at the site of a planned trailhead off Tram Road that had been heavily disturbed by logging. Two shovel tests, dug to one meter at the sites of a proposed composting toilet and information kiosk, produced no artifacts, but a surface walkover recovered whiteware, a fragment of prehistoric grit-tempered pottery and two chert flakes. A fragment of a Herty cup, a clay vessel used to collect pine gum, found on a nearby dirt road, hinted at naval stores activity.

=== Roads, timber and turpentine ===
A historic highway linking Pensacola and St. Augustine appears to have skirted the park's northern boundary. Planned as a major overland route connecting east and west Florida through Tallahassee, the section between Tallahassee and St. Augustine was built under contract by John Bellamy in the 1820s and became known as the Bellamy Road; an 1825 plat map shows it following the approximate route of modern Old St. Augustine Road, now U.S. Highway 27, which forms the park's northern edge.

Many of the roads inside the park are themselves historic, some of them dating to the mid-19th century. The main north–south road was well established by 1954 and probably followed an older informal network; aerial photographs from 1937 and 1941 show roads along the high ground between Gum Creek and the St. Marks River. A bridge crossing shown on USGS topographic mapping in the northern part of the park may also be historic.

The Tallahassee region took part in the naval stores industry that began after the American Civil War and continued into the 1940s, as well as in the timber industry. Aerial photographs indicate that the tract has been used chiefly for agriculture, timber production or turpentine production since at least the 1930s, and it also supported private hunting leases. Detailed research on ownership before that date has not been carried out. Immediately before the state purchase, the land belonged to the St. Joe Paper Company, which once held vast acreages in the Florida Panhandle.

=== Acquisition and establishment ===
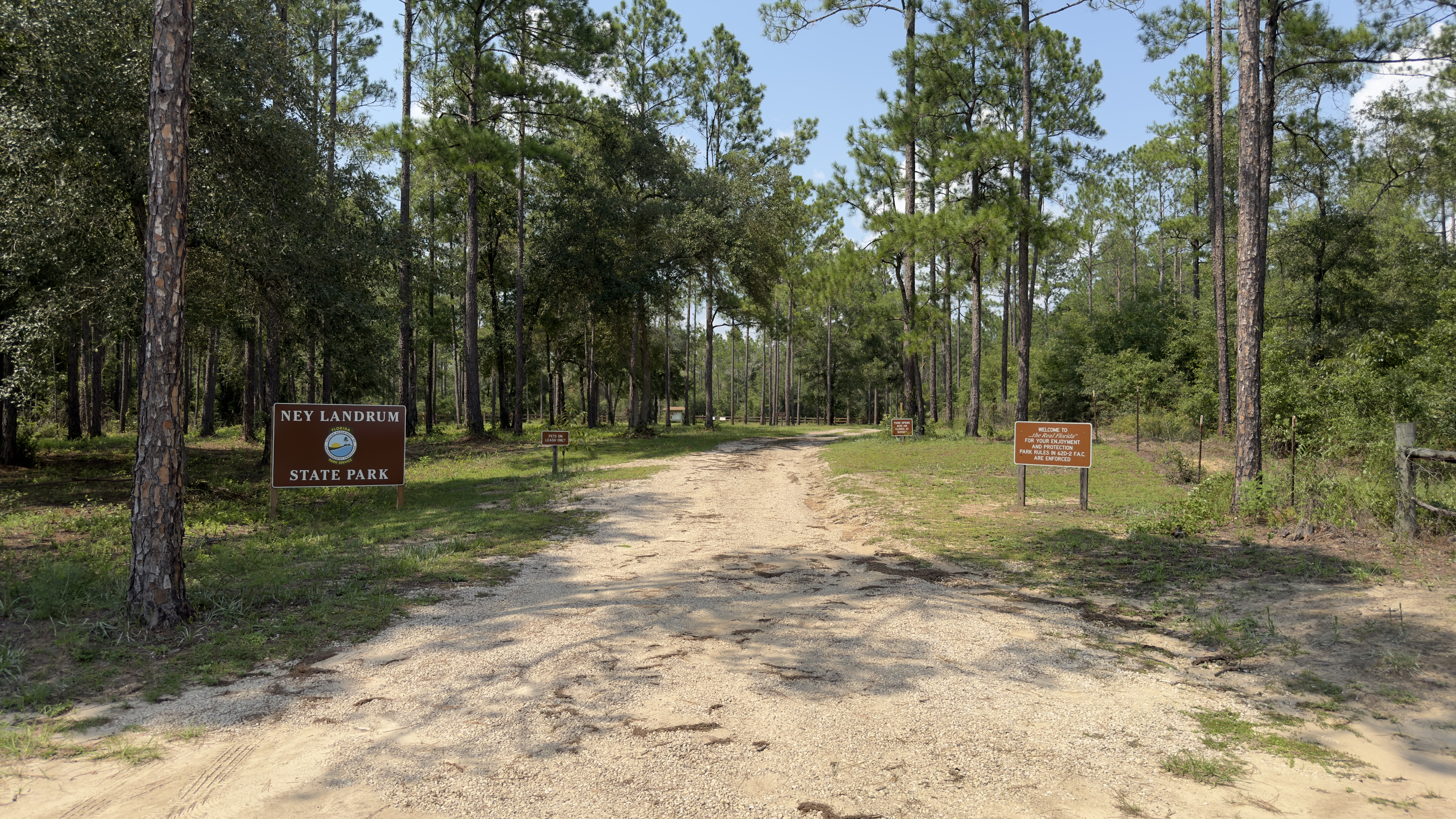
Park entrance featuring new signage on the left.

The tract lies within the Upper St. Marks River Corridor, an "A"-ranked Florida Forever project whose stated goal is to buffer the upper river from development and preserve its water quality while protecting the floodplain's natural communities. Completed, the project would create a permanent wildlife corridor along the St. Marks River linking local, state and federal conservation lands from Tallahassee to the Gulf of Mexico.

The Board of Trustees purchased the 2,589.67-acre parcel on January 24, 2006, from St. Joe Timberland Company of Delaware, LLC, for $10,617,647, using Florida Forever funds; the warranty deed is dated June 28, 2006, and the Trustees hold the land in fee simple. The sale, brokered with the assistance of The Nature Conservancy, was announced the following day as part of a wider series of transactions through which the state, the Conservancy and St. Joe had protected more than 155,000 acres of company timberland. DEP secretary Colleen M. Castille said the purchase would "protect water quality in the St. Marks River and nearby waterways, and preserve native habitat for gopher tortoises, migrant bird species and the threatened Florida black bear."

On December 21, 2006, the Trustees transferred management authority to DEP's Division of Recreation and Parks under lease agreement No. 4535, a fifty-year lease expiring on December 20, 2056, which stipulates that the property be used for the conservation and protection of natural and historical resources. The park opened for recreational use in 2007 as the 161st unit of the Florida state park system. Its first unit management plan was approved on June 10, 2011, following a public workshop on February 15 and an advisory group meeting the next day. The Trustees have acquired no additional land for the park since 2006, although the plan's optimum boundary identifies a second phase of the Florida Forever project running south from Tram Road to Natural Bridge Battlefield Historic State Park, together with an 80-acre (32 ha) outparcel inside the park.

== Geography ==
=== Physiography ===
The park lies in the shallow valley of the St. Marks River corridor, between U.S. Highway 27 on the north and Tram Road on the south. Land immediately east and west of the park rises above 160 feet (49 m), characteristic of the Tallahassee Hills, but the highest point within the park is about 70 feet (21 m), in the far north and along the western boundary. From these rises the ground falls into a broad floodplain with almost no relief, at elevations of 30 to 40 feet (9.1 to 12.2 m).

=== Geology and soils ===
The dominant geological feature near the park is the Cody Scarp, described in the management plan as one of the most persistent topographic breaks in Florida. The escarpment marks an ancient shoreline and divides the Northern Highlands, including the Tallahassee Hills, from the coastal lowlands to the south, which take in the Woodville Karst Plain and the River Valley Lowlands. Tram Road closely follows the scarp near the park; just west of the park, elevations rise from 55 to 165 feet (17 to 50 m) over a short distance, a slope of about nine percent. Twenty-one soil units occur within the park boundary, and no minerals of commercial value are known.

=== Hydrology ===
The St. Marks River rises in eastern Leon County near Capitola, where it is little more than a chain of connected wetlands, and gathers enough drainage to become a recognizable dark-water creek by the time it crosses U.S. Highway 27 into the park. Within the park the river is strongly seasonal: whole reaches commonly dry up or shrink to isolated shallow pools during droughts, while heavy rainfall can send large volumes of fast-moving water through the river and floodplain. (Note: The management plan gives Tropical Storm Fay as its example of such an event but dates the storm to 2007; Fay crossed Florida in August 2008.) The river acquires reliable base flow only well downstream of the park, about 6.25 miles (10.06 km) south of Tram Road, where the second-magnitude Horn Spring and Chicken Branch Spring discharge into it; below that point it can be paddled.

Three drainages enter the river inside the park, all originating in broad basin swamps with poorly defined channels and flowing in from the northeast. The northernmost, Burnt Mill Creek, becomes a defined streambed for its last several hundred feet before cascading into a large sinkhole about 0.5 miles (0.80 km) upstream of its surface confluence with the river; most of the creek's flow disappears underground there, and only very heavy rain produces a broad sheet of water across the flooded sinkhole and on through the floodplain to the river. Sweetwater Branch and Moore Branch are ephemeral streams following strings of black gum wetlands. The sinkhole, near the park's northeast corner and adjoining an old-growth cypress dome, is identified in the management plan as a significant natural feature and a potential trail destination.

The park sits above the Floridan aquifer, which in this area supplies the potable water of Tallahassee, and all waters within the park are designated Outstanding Florida Waters and classified as Class III waters.

== Climate ==
The park has a humid subtropical climate (Köppen Cfa), typical of the Florida Big Bend. Summers are long, hot, and humid, with frequent afternoon thunderstorms, and winters are mild and generally dry but subject to occasional freezes; annual rainfall recorded at the on-site park gauge averages about 57 in (1,400 mm). The nearest first-order weather station is at Tallahassee International Airport (USW00093805), about 15 mi (24 km) west of the park.

Climate data for Tallahassee International Airport, the nearest weather station (1991–2020 normals, extremes 1892–present)
Month	Jan	Feb	Mar	Apr	May	Jun	Jul	Aug	Sep	Oct	Nov	Dec	Year
Record high °F (°C)	84 (29)	89 (32)	91 (33)	95 (35)	102 (39)	105 (41)	104 (40)	103 (39)	102 (39)	97 (36)	89 (32)	84 (29)	105 (41)
Mean daily maximum °F (°C)	63.9 (17.7)	67.8 (19.9)	74.2 (23.4)	80.2 (26.8)	87.4 (30.8)	90.8 (32.7)	92.1 (33.4)	91.5 (33.1)	88.6 (31.4)	81.7 (27.6)	72.5 (22.5)	65.9 (18.8)	79.7 (26.5)
Daily mean °F (°C)	52.2 (11.2)	55.6 (13.1)	61.4 (16.3)	67.3 (19.6)	75.2 (24.0)	80.8 (27.1)	82.5 (28.1)	82.4 (28.0)	79.1 (26.2)	70.3 (21.3)	60.2 (15.7)	54.4 (12.4)	68.5 (20.3)
Mean daily minimum °F (°C)	40.5 (4.7)	43.5 (6.4)	48.6 (9.2)	54.4 (12.4)	63.0 (17.2)	70.8 (21.6)	73.0 (22.8)	73.2 (22.9)	69.6 (20.9)	58.8 (14.9)	48.0 (8.9)	42.9 (6.1)	57.2 (14.0)
Record low °F (°C)	6 (−14)	−2 (−19)	20 (−7)	29 (−2)	34 (1)	46 (8)	57 (14)	57 (14)	40 (4)	29 (−2)	13 (−11)	10 (−12)	−2 (−19)
Average precipitation inches (mm)	4.41 (112)	4.28 (109)	5.24 (133)	3.53 (90)	3.36 (85)	7.76 (197)	7.14 (181)	7.60 (193)	4.91 (125)	3.24 (82)	3.10 (79)	4.24 (108)	58.81 (1,494)
Average precipitation days (≥ 0.01 in)	8.9	8.1	8.0	6.7	7.5	14.3	16.4	14.8	9.0	5.9	6.3	8.3	114.2
Source: NOAA

== Ecology ==
=== Flora ===
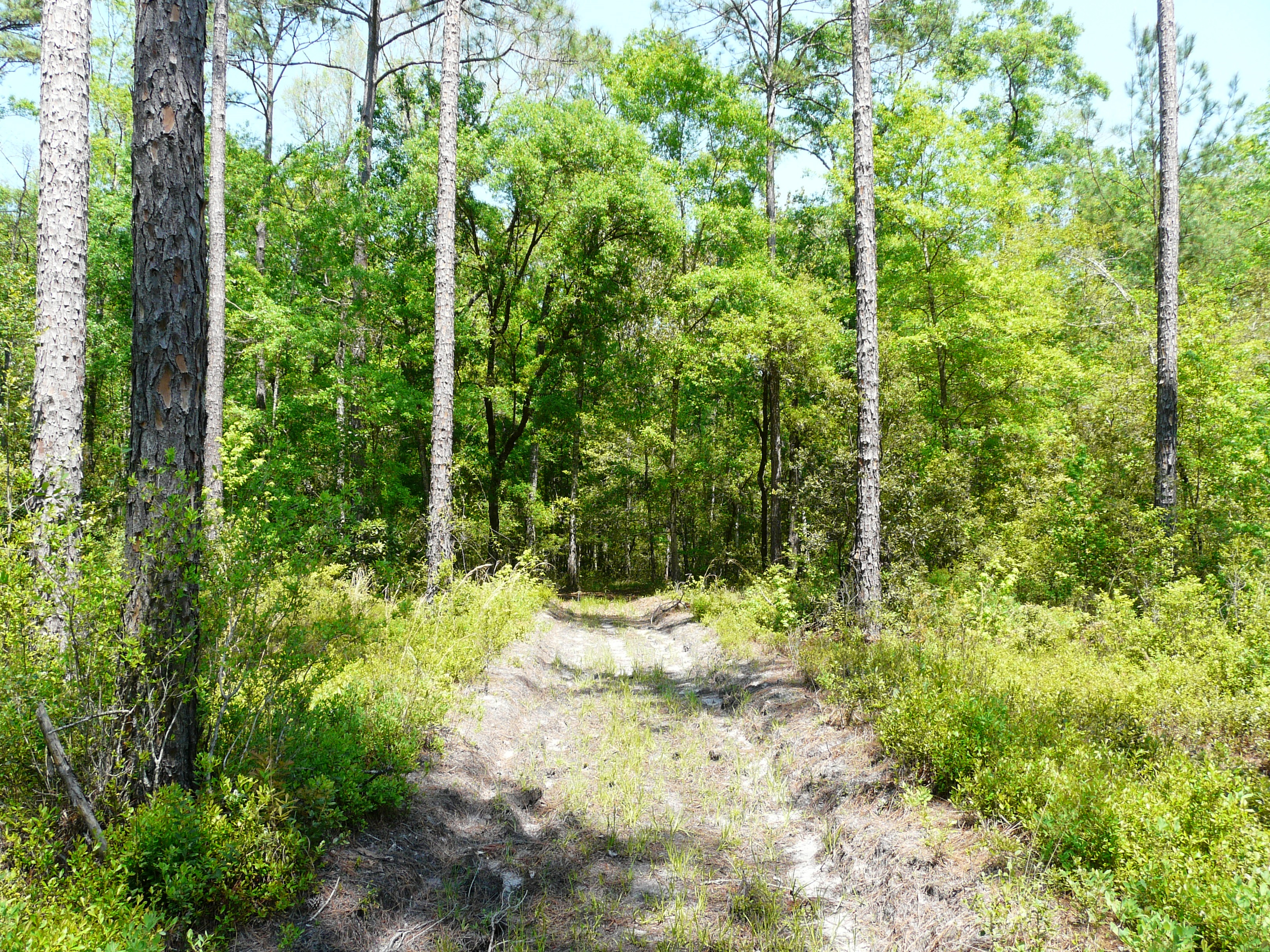
Forest along the Blue Trail

The Florida Natural Areas Inventory (FNAI) classification recognizes twelve natural communities in the park, together with ruderal and developed areas and about 370 acres (150 ha) of pine plantation mapped as an overlay on the sandhill. The largest are sandhill (765 acres, 310 ha), floodplain swamp (625 acres, 253 ha), mesic flatwoods (406 acres, 164 ha), floodplain forest (312 acres, 126 ha) and basin swamp (169 acres, 68 ha), followed by upland mixed forest, upland pine forest, dome swamp, blackwater stream, shrub bog, seepage slope and depression marsh.

The mesic flatwoods were managed as high-yield commercial timberland for six decades before state acquisition. Longleaf pine, once the dominant canopy species, survives only as scattered volunteers, and widely spaced planted slash pine left from thinning operations forms most of the present canopy. Evergreen shrubs such as gallberry, glossy fetterbush and titi cover most of the forest floor; in the far northwest of the park, where silviculture appears largely to have bypassed the lower-lying ground, dense shrub growth and a deep accumulation of leaf litter and duff produce a high fuel load and a risk of high-intensity wildfire under drought conditions. Sandhill occupies nearly all the well-drained uplands, where, despite past silviculture, wiregrass and broomsedge remain relatively evenly distributed alongside turkey oak, bluejack oak, sparkleberry, winged sumac and blazing star.

=== Fauna ===
The 2011 management plan listed as imperiled nine animals known to occur in or frequent the park: the Florida black bear, gopher tortoise, little blue heron, snowy egret, white ibis, swallow-tailed kite, wood stork, southeastern American kestrel and merlin, the last two groups qualifying partly through FNAI rankings rather than state listing. Several of those statuses have since changed: the Florida Fish and Wildlife Conservation Commission removed the Florida black bear from Florida's endangered and threatened species list in 2012 and the snowy egret and white ibis in 2017, when it reclassified the little blue heron from a species of special concern to state-threatened. As of 2025 the gopher tortoise, little blue heron and southeastern American kestrel are listed as state-threatened and the wood stork as federally threatened, while the swallow-tailed kite and merlin do not appear on the state list. The plan's imperiled species table also lists four plants; of these the Alabama azalea occurs sparingly along a small drainage in the floodplain forest and the hooded pitcherplant as two small clumps on a seepage slope, alongside cardinal flower and southern crabapple.

The Florida black bear inhabits the entire St. Marks River corridor and, because bears require large contiguous tracts, the management plan treats completion of the Upper St. Marks River Corridor project as a priority. Gopher tortoises occupy the high, dry pinelands, with most known burrows in the northern management zones just south of U.S. Highway 27; a burrow survey of two of those zones recorded many active burrows, including one small enough to indicate a very young animal, and the plan called for fuller surveys alongside prescribed burning. Wading birds have been observed in the park's basin swamps and river floodplain, while wood storks, swallow-tailed kites and falcons are recorded mainly as fly-overs. Other wildlife includes bobcat, gray fox, white-tailed deer, wild turkey, southeastern pocket gopher and eastern diamondback rattlesnake.

== Management ==
The park is classified as a state preserve, a category in which resource considerations take priority over visitor use and development is held to the minimum needed for protection, access and interpretation. It has no full-time on-site staff or support facilities and is administered by staff based at Lake Jackson Mounds Archaeological State Park.

Prescribed burning is the Division of Recreation and Parks' primary management tool at the park, applied to mimic the lightning-set fires that historically shaped the landscape and to reduce the fuels that accumulate in fire-dependent communities. The Florida Park Service classifies the park's mesic flatwoods, sandhill, upland pine forest, depression marsh and seepage slope as fire-dependent, and its upland mixed forest, basin swamp and dome swamp as fire-influenced; burn zones, objectives and prescriptions are reviewed annually. Species said to benefit from the burning program include the gopher tortoise, southeastern pocket gopher, northern bobwhite, white-tailed deer and wild turkey. Of the park's twenty-three management zones, nineteen were designated for management with prescribed fire, with optimal fire return intervals of two to five years in the mesic flatwoods and two to four years in the sandhill.

== Recreation ==
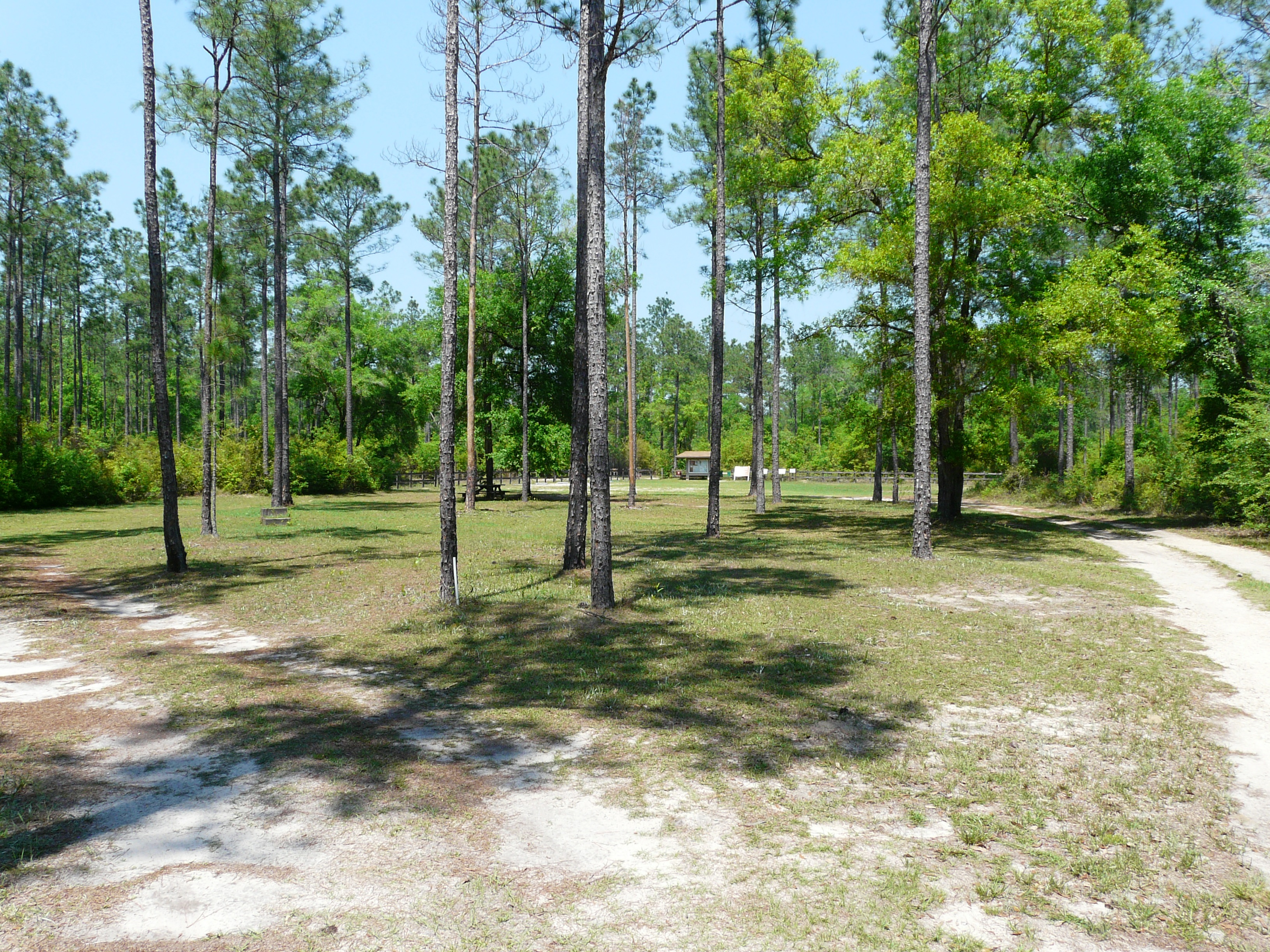
Entrance area

Access is from a trailhead near the park's southwestern corner on Tram Road, 6 miles (9.7 km) east of W. W. Kelly Road, with a stabilized parking area for about 10 to 15 cars and four horse trailers, picnic tables and an interpretive sign. Roughly 7 miles (11 km) of multi-use trails, following the park's historic road network, are open to hiking, off-road bicycling and horseback riding; they are mostly soft, dry and sandy, with wet sections and low water crossings in the rainy season, and pass through floodplain forest, xeric hammock, flatwoods, sandhill and bay heads. Birding and wildlife viewing are among the main activities. The park has no water or restroom facilities. DEP's economic impact assessment recorded 125,457 visits to the park in the 2022–23 fiscal year.

For most of the year the stretch of river within the park holds too little water for paddling, boating, swimming or fishing, and at high water it is generally too dangerous for recreational use; the management plan anticipated monitoring water levels with a view to a possible seasonal paddling trail. The plan's conceptual land use proposals, largely unbuilt, included restrooms and picnic shelters at the existing trailhead, a second trailhead off U.S. Highway 27 at the north end of the park with parking for twenty vehicles, a primitive horse camp for organized equestrian groups, a support area with a staff residence and shop, a service bridge over the river, and a trail network of 8 to 12 miles (13 to 19 km). Once those facilities were complete the plan estimated an optimum daily carrying capacity of 148 visitors, against 56 at the time of writing.
