= Vail Agenda =

The National Park Service underwent an intensive review of its responsibilities and prospects for the future during its 75th anniversary celebration in 1991. It culminated its efforts in October 1991 with a symposium in Vail, Colo. that including several hundred participants from both within and outside the NPS. The gathering, the Oct. 10, 1991 session of which was officially a public meeting advertised in the Federal Register of Sept. 19, 1991, resulted in six strategic objectives and the identification of a variety of issues and recommendations, which were published in a book titled National Parks for the 21st Century: The Vail Agenda (Library of Congress Card Number: 92-60741). Although the meeting took place during the administration of Secretary of the Interior Manuel Lujan and NPS Director James Ridenour, with the book itself published under the leadership of Secretary Bruce Babbitt and Director Roger Kennedy, who wrote the foreword and preface, the Vail agenda and vision remains today as a directional tool for the NPS. (See 12-Point Plan: The Challenge (1985))

== Vail Agenda Strategic Objectives ==
	Goal
1.	Resource Stewardship and Protection: The primary responsibility of the National Park Service must be protection of park resources.
2.	Access and Enjoyment: Each park unit should be managed to provide the nation's diverse public with access to and recreational and educational enjoyment of the lessons contained in that unit, while maintaining unimpaired those unique attributes that are its contribution to the national park system.
3.	Education and Interpretation: It should be the responsibility of the NPS to interpret and convey each park unit's and the park system's contributions to the nation's values, character, and experience.
4.	Proactive Leadership: The NPS must be a leader in local, national, and international park affairs, actively pursuing the mission of the national park system and assisting others in managing their park resources and values.
5.	Science and Research: The NPS must engage in a sustained and integrated program of natural, cultural, and social science resource management and research aimed at acquiring and using the information needed to manage and protect park resources.
6.	Professionalism: The NPS must create and maintain a highly professional organization and work force.

== Objectives ==
- Strategic Objective 1: Resource Stewardship and Preservation

The primary responsibility of the National Park Service must be protection of park resources from internal and external impairment.

RECOMMENDATION—The National Park Service should provide technical and planning assistance to public and private parties able to mitigate external and transboundary threats to park unit resources, and to those able to influence the quality of visitor enjoyment and enlightenment through their provision of gateway services.
RECOMMENDATION—The National Park Service should utilize available resources, expertise and cooperative relationships to ensure compliance with applicable law when external activities otherwise endanger park resources.
RECOMMENDATION—Each park unit should be managed to protect unimpaired the special resources and values that constitute its contribution to the national identity and experience. Such values may include a unit's unique historic significance, cultural lessons, wilderness traits, recreational opportunities, and/or ecological systems.
RECOMMENDATION—Natural resources in the park system should be managed under ecological principles that prevent their impairment. Cultural diversity and social and historical contexts should be recognized as significant values in the protection and stewardship of historical and cultural resources.
RECOMMENDATION—The National Park Service should seek active public and private partners engaged in resource protection, research, education, and visitor enjoyment that are consistent with the objectives of protecting park values and conveying their meaning to the public.
RECOMMENDATION—The National Park Service should reinforce its role as a world leader in park affairs through agreements and actions which facilitate the exchange of information, development of environmental and cultural resource preservation strategies, and protection of critical world resources.
RECOMMENDATION—Programs, such as an American Heritage Area program, should be established to preserve and protect natural, cultural and historical resources that are worthy of national recognition, but that do not meet the requirements necessary for full inclusion in the National Park System. Such programs should make use of public and private sector partnerships, technical assistance, and Park Service support. RECOMMENDATION—The National Park Service should fully implement, and be provided requisite funding for, existing legislative mandates under Public Law 88–29, requiring the Department of Interior to produce at five-year intervals a nationwide recreation plan; the Land and Water Conservation Fund Act; the Urban Parks and Recreation Resources Act; the Historic Preservation Fund Act, and related statutes.

*Strategic Objective 2: Access and Enjoyment
Each park unit should be managed to provide the nation's diverse public with access to and recreational and educational enjoyment of the lessons contained in that unit, while maintaining unimpaired those unique attributes that are its contribution to the National Park System.
RECOMMENDATION—The National Park Service should minimize the development of facilities within the park boundaries to the extent consistent with the mission of conveying each individual park unit's significance to the public.
RECOMMENDATION—Where wilderness values are present, impairment of those values should not be compromised.
RECOMMENDATION—The repair and maintenance of existing park facilities should be undertaken and designed to fulfill the purpose of conveying park values to the public, while protecting the special qualities of each park unit.
RECOMMENDATION—Facilities that are purely for the convenience of visitors should be provided by the private sector in gateway communities.

*Strategic Objective 3: Education and Interpretation
It should be the responsibility of the National Park Service to interpret and convey each park unit's and the park system's contributions to the nation's values, character, and experience.
RECOMMENDATION—Each visitor to a park unit should have access to a basic interpretation of the unit's unique features and significance. The Park Service should invest in innovative expansions of its ability to provide interpretation that enhances visitor enjoyment and enlightenment.
RECOMMENDATION—The National Park Service should launch a specific program of educational outreach, directed at schools and community groups and designed to maximize the public's access to the unique ecological, historical, cultural, and geologic lessons contained in the park system
RECOMMENDATION-The National Park Service should embark upon a systematic, park-by-park, usable inventory of information on park resources and visitor needs.
RECOMMENDATION—Comprehensive information on park unit resources and public needs, acquired by resource professionals and solicited from citizens, should be incorporated directly into the management of park units and other agency programs which serve the public.

- Strategic Objective 4: Proactive Leadership

The National Park Service must be a leader in local, national and international park affairs, actively pursuing the mission of the National Park System and assisting others in managing their park resources and values.
RECOMMENDATION—The National Park Service should establish a headquarters Office of Legislative and Policy Analysis, and reestablish within this office a corresponding legislative program.
RECOMMENDATION—The National Park Service should establish an Office of Strategic Planning, charged with documenting impediments to the mission of the National Park Service, generating feasible solutions and funding requirements, and communicating these to the Director and the Office of Legislative and Policy Analysis.
RECOMMENDATION—The National Park Service should reestablish an areas study program, covering both natural and heritage resources and charged with initiating and responding to proposals for park system additions. This program could be based within the Office of Strategic Planning.
RECOMMENDATION—The National Park Service should clarify existing legislative and regulatory authorities for addressing external and transboundary resource threats, ensure their use, and seek additional legislative authority where needed.
RECOMMENDATION—The National Park Service should initiate an intensive training program for managers to explain authorities, mechanisms and strategies for addressing external and transboundary issues, and to help managers view the natural, cultural, and historical contexts of their units.
RECOMMENDATION—The management and resources of the National Park Service should be focused to maximize educational, recreational, and cultural value in the park units and other agency programs which serve the public.
RECOMMENDATION—The National Park Service should assess its capabilities for decentralized management. Effective decentralized organization will require: functions of support and service to the parks, liaison with non-Service parties, systems of accountability and control, training in management principles, and broader grants of authority to superintendents and staff in line operations.

*Strategic Objective 5: Science and Research
The National Park Service must engage in a sustained and integrated program of natural, cultural and social science resource management and research aimed at acquiring and using the information needed to manage and protect park resources.
RECOMMENDATION—Secure legislation and funding that support a research mandate for the Park Service.
RECOMMENDATION—Accelerate the training of Park Service managers in information management and the role, use and production of research information.
RECOMMENDATION—Base resource protection, access and interpretation decisions and programs on full consideration of the best available scientific research; where quality information is lacking, initiate it through Park Service resource management professionals.

*Strategic Objective 6: Professionalism
The National Park Service must create and maintain a highly professional organization and workforce.
RECOMMENDATION—The National Park Service should establish and/or raise educational requirements as appropriate for professional track positions, including those that require strong bases of technical, scientific, interpretative, administrative, and/or managerial knowledge.
RECOMMENDATION—The National Park Service should strengthen recruitment, hiring and retention of a culturally diverse professional workforce.
RECOMMENDATION—The National Park Service should implement a comprehensive program of broad-based, mission-driven employee training.
RECOMMENDATION—All National Park Service employees should receive basic orientation training that covers the agency's objectives, purpose, history, and organization.
RECOMMENDATION—National Park Service training should focus on development of present and future management and leadership capabilities, as well as appropriate professional and technical skills.
RECOMMENDATION—Working with the Office of Personnel Management and the Office of Management and Budget, the National Park Service should undertake a comprehensive review of its existing compensation structure. This review should be conducted under needs criteria derived from the mission of the Park Service and in light of professional compensation structures in related resource agencies.
RECOMMENDATION—The National Park Service should create a Human Resources Management Board with responsibility for senior management assignment, training and development, and for developing the agency's plans for training, career advancement procedures, and educational requirements.

== See also ==
- National Park Service
- James M. Ridenour

== Reading ==
- National Parks for the 21st Century, The Vail Agenda; National Park Foundation; Chelsea Green Publishing Company, Post mills, Vermont, 1992
