= Northwest Power and Conservation Council =

Regional organization in the Northwestern U.S.

Member states of the Northwest Power and Conservation Council

The Northwest Power and Conservation Council is a regional organization that develops and maintains a regional power plan and a fish and wildlife program to balance the environment and energy needs of the Northwestern United States. Based in Portland, Oregon, the council was created in 1980 when the U.S. Congress passed the Pacific Northwest Electric Power Planning and Conservation Act. The Council has a planning and public engagement role in carrying out the interstate compact created by the Act. The Council's main task is to develop a 20-year electric power plan that will guarantee adequate and reliable energy at the lowest economic and environmental cost to the Northwest. Member states of the organization are Idaho, Montana, Oregon, and Washington.

== Legislative background ==
The first proposal to create a regional planning council to address the area's power needs was the Pacific Northwest Utilities Conference Committee (PNUCC) bill introduced in 1978. This bill was abandoned in mid-1980 because public utilities opposed its cost-sharing formula and state governors felt it did not adequately incorporate conservation, equity, and the public interest. The four state governors proposed a regional council again in 1979. Utilities favored this approach because it created a political framework for managing public opposition to new projects. States had already begun to engage in power planning and saw the regional council as a logical extension of that activity. Both utilities and states preferred to place some limits on the federal Bonneville Power Administration (BPA).

Representative John D. Dingell, in his roles as Chair of the House Commerce Committee and as an avid fisherman, played an important role in developing the Act.

The Pacific Northwest Electric Power Planning and Conservation Act, known as the Northwest Power Act, was enacted on December 5, 1980, creating the Pacific Northwest Electric Power and Conservation Planning Council. At the Council's first meeting, it adopted the name Northwest Power and Conservation Council.

The council is unique in its institutional structure and mission, while operating legally as an interstate compact. Its structure as an interstate compact helps to address concerns that the council, by moving authority from the executive branch to the states, would violate the appointments clause of the Constitution. Although it had originally been assumed that the state governors had the authority to appoint members of the council, further research found that state legislation was required. Montana and Oregon passed laws enacting the compact in 1981, followed by Idaho and Washington in 1982.

== Fish and wildlife ==
The council developed its first fish and wildlife plan in 1980, before developing its first power plan. The Council updates the fish and wildlife plan about every five years. As a planning, policymaking, and reviewing body, the council develops the program. Then it monitors its implementation by the BPA, the United States Army Corps of Engineers, the United States Bureau of Reclamation, the Federal Energy Regulatory Commission, and their licensees. The Northwest Power Act directs the council to develop its program and make periodic major revisions by first requesting recommendations from the region's federal and state fish and wildlife agencies, appropriate tribes (those within the basin), and other interested parties. The council also takes comments from designated entities and the public on those recommendations. The council then issues a draft amended program, initiating an extensive public comment period on the recommendations and proposed program amendments, which includes written comments, public hearings in each of the four states, and consultations with interested parties. This process combines legislative and judicial elements, blending "mediation, consultation, and judgment" with policymaking.

Between 1998 and 2018, BPA funds from the council's fish and wildlife program supported publication of the Columbia Basin Bulletin, a stakeholder engagement newsletter that is now supported by subscriptions.

== Power plan ==
Although the council's process for developing the power plan also relies on broad public participation to inform the plan and build consensus on its recommendations, it is a more typical legislative process. Innovative features introduced with the first policy plan include inclusion of environmental costs in its calculations, treating energy conservation as a resource, and giving conservation preference over other resources. As required by the Northwest Power Act, the council's first power plan used two sets of priorities: cost-effectiveness of resources and prioritizing among conservation, renewable energy, cogeneration, and conventional energy sources (nuclear, coal). The analysis found that conservation was the most cost-effective, satisfying both criteria and making conservation the focus of the first plan, published in 1983.

The council updates the 20-year electric power plan every five years. The plan generally targets energy efficiency and predicts that a large share of the new electricity demand over the next 20 years in the Northwestern United States can be met by improving energy efficiency. The Council's eighth plan, emphasizing renewable energy sources and demand response, was adopted in February 2022. Preliminary analysis for the ninth plan, expected to be published in 2026, anticipates strong energy demand growth driven by data centers.

== See also ==
- Western Climate Initiative – Nonprofit-run emissions trading scheme in California and Quebec
- The Climate Registry – Non-profit organization
