= Fran P. Mainella =

16th Director of the National Park Service of the United States

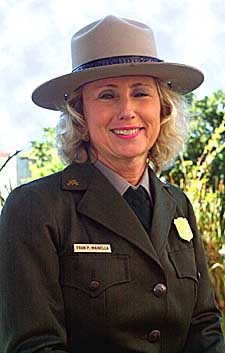

16th Director of the National Park Service
- In office July 18, 2001 – October 16, 2006
- President: George W. Bush
- Preceded by: Robert Stanton
- Succeeded by: Mary A. Bomar

Personal details
- Born: 1947 (age 78–79) Willimantic, Connecticut
- Education: University of Connecticut; Central Connecticut State College

Frances P. Mainella (born 1947) was the 16th Director of the National Park Service of the United States and first woman to hold that position. She was appointed by President George W. Bush and confirmed by the U.S. Senate in 2001. She announced her retirement in July 2006 and resigned effective October 15, 2006. Mary A. Bomar, was sworn-in as the 17th Director on October 17, 2006. Mainella was in charge of the NPS when it allowed Redskin's Owner Dan Snyder to illegally remove 130 trees from his property, and while the park ranger who blew the whistle on this activity, Ranger Robert M. Danno, was persecuted at length. She subsequently gave contradictory accounts of this to federal investigators.

She currently is a visiting scholar at Clemson University where she is Co-Chair of the US Play Coalition - a partnership to promote the value of play throughout life. Additionally, she serves as Chair of the Public Lands Advisory Council to the National Environmental Education Foundation, a member of Newsweek Magazine’s Environmental Advisory Board, a Fellow of the American Academy for Park and Recreation Administration, a member of the Board of Directors for the Children and Nature Network, a member of the Board of Directors for the National Park Trust, Chair of the National Recreation and Park Foundation, and a national speaker on Nature Deficit Disorder, Play and Parks and Recreation.

She was born in Willimantic, Connecticut, and received a bachelor's degree from the University of Connecticut and a master's degree from Central Connecticut State College. In 2002 she received an honorary doctorate in public service from Central Connecticut State University.

Prior to her position at the National Park Service, Mainella served twelve years as director of Florida’s State Parks, which were awarded the Gold Medal Award, recognizing Florida as the best state park system in the country.

In 1998 she received the Pugsley Medal "for outstanding leadership in enhancing the Florida State Park system". In addition Clemson University, and the Hartzog Fund named an award after her in 2003 in recognition of her service. The Fran P. Mainella Award is subtitled the "Outstanding Woman in Park Resources Award."

== Awards ==
In 2002, Clemson University presented her with its Walter T. Cox Award, which recognizes leadership in public service, public land administration, and natural and cultural resource policy. The American Recreation Coalition also presented her with its 2002 Sheldon Coleman Great Outdoors Award. In 2006, she was awarded the William Penn Mott, Jr. Award for Excellence by the National Society for Park Resources. From 2007 to 2010, the Clemson University Board of Trustees presented her with an award for faculty excellence. Clemson also recently named an award in her honor to encourage women to pursue conservation careers. In 2007, Mainella was presented the Pugsley Medal a second time for outstanding national leadership, the highest award given by the American Academy for Park and Recreation Administration. Mainella is one of very few that have ever received this high recognition twice.

She has also been selected as the Metcalf Lecturer for SUNY- Cortland, the first ever Ralph Steele Lecturer for East Carolina University, and the Calhoun Lecturer for Clemson University. In 2011, Mainella received the outstanding alumni of the year award from the University of Connecticut Neag School of Education.

Additionally, she has written many article and book publications including the introduction to National Geographic’s 10 Best of Everything National Parks and an acknowledgement to Richard Louv’s new book, The Nature Principle.

== Controversy ==
A January 19, 2006, report from the U.S. Department of the Interior's Office of Inspector General entitled "Report of Investigation - Allegations that the National Park Service Improperly Allowed Daniel Snyder to Cut trees on Government Land" reported that Daniel P. Smith, Mainella's Special Assistant at the National Park Service, stated Mainella attended a Washington Redskins vs. New York Giants football game, whereupon she was asked by one of Washington Redskins owner Daniel Snyder's associates to provide assistance with cutting down trees on the Chesapeake & Ohio Canal, which is managed by the National Park Service. According to the investigation, Snyder had wanted the trees removed for years because they blocked the view from his multimillion-dollar mansion, but had been unsuccessful previously in persuading NPS to allow him to clear cut them. The report said Smith told investigators that during the game, Mainella told Snyder's associate to speak with Smith. After the game, Mainella assigned Smith the project of assisting Snyder. Smith then worked through the National Capital Regional Office of the NPS and the park's Acting Superintendent, Kevin Brandt, to pressure and push for the project's completion. The report noted Smith went so far as to meet with Snyder at Snyder's Potomac, MD mansion to hammer out details of the tree cutting.

The report stated that when she was asked about her actions regarding Snyder and the trees, Mainella' said she failed to recall these meetings and conversations. However, C&O Canal NPS Acting Superintendent Kevin Brandt stated to investigators that he interacted with Director Mainella on multiple occasions regarding the Snyder deal and that she was the driving force behind the issue from the NPS side. The report concluded that both Smith and Brandt made false statements during the investigation and that Smith and Mainella's contrasting accounts of what happened prolonged the investigation and unnecessarily cost the government additional time and monies. The report further noted that Mainella had apparently falsely claimed during the investigation that the first time she learned of the issue was in an article in the Washington Post, and that she failed to recall if or when she'd ever attended a Washington Redskins football game. The report concluded Snyder should not have cut the trees and the NPS violated law and policy in permitting him to do so. The report further stated the Office of Inspector General had presented their findings to the Fraud and Public Corruption Unit of the U.S. Attorney's Office for Washington, DC for criminal prosecution, but that the U.S. Attorney's Office declined to prosecute the case and the matter was referred back to NPS for administrative adjudication. Shortly thereafter, Mainella resigned as director of the NPS. Mainella's Special Assistant, Smith, later said in an interview that he had received a letter of reprimand in April 2006 for "overstepping his discretion" but defended his actions, claiming he did "nothing tawdry."

== Career ==
Title	Location	From	To
Visiting Scholar	Clemson University - Clemson, SC	November 2006	Present
16th Director of the National Park Service	Washington, D.C.	July 2001	October 2006
Director of Florida State Parks	Tallahassee, FL	October 1989	July 2001
Executive Director - Florida Recreation and Park Association	Tallahassee, FL	March 1983	October 1989
Director of Recreation	Lake Park, FL	December 1978	March 1983

Government offices
Preceded by Robert Stanton	Director of the National Park Service; 2001–2006	Succeeded by Mary A. Bomar
