= Organization of the National Park Service =

Bureau of the US Department of the Interior

The National Park Service (NPS) in the United States is a Bureau of the Department of the Interior with its headquarters located in Washington, D.C. The bureaus consist of numerous support offices and seven regional offices, which oversee park operations within their geographic area. The NPS has 3 main offices/verticals that support the Office of the Director: The Office of Congressional & External Relations, The Office of Management & Administration, and Operations.

The National Park Service changed its organizational structure in 1995 in response to the changes that had confronted it over the previous decades. The various causes of this change were the National Performance Review, and a legally mandated staffing reduction. The resultant Restructuring Plan for the National Park Service built on earlier efforts within the Service – the 21st Century Task Force Report, the VAIL AGENDA, the NPS STRATEGIC PLAN, and the Recommendations of the Reorganization Work Group.

The plan reduced the number of central offices and by the creation of 16 ecological-cultural-geographical based clusters in seven regions. The first steps were taken in 1995 to begin the change. By 2000, the restructuring plan had been revised four times leaving seven regions, which were substantially smaller than before. Of the 16 ‘eco-clusters’ envisioned in the plan, only those clusters based on older regional offices, i.e., Boston, Seattle, and Santa Fe exist. (See Director Kennedy)

== Office of the Director ==
The Office of the Director is led by NPS Director Jessica Bowron (acting).

	Office of the Director
Chief of Staff	Office of the Chief Financial Officer	Senior Science Advisor

== Washington Office ==
The National Park Service's main office is located in the Interior Building (Main Interior), a few blocks west of the White House and a block north of the Mall. The National Park Service is the largest bureau in the department and has often required additional space. Through the 1960s, numerous offices were located on ‘L’ Street N.W. In 1990, the ‘L’ Street offices moved to 800 N. Capitol, just north of the Government Printing Office and next to the train station.

== Regions ==
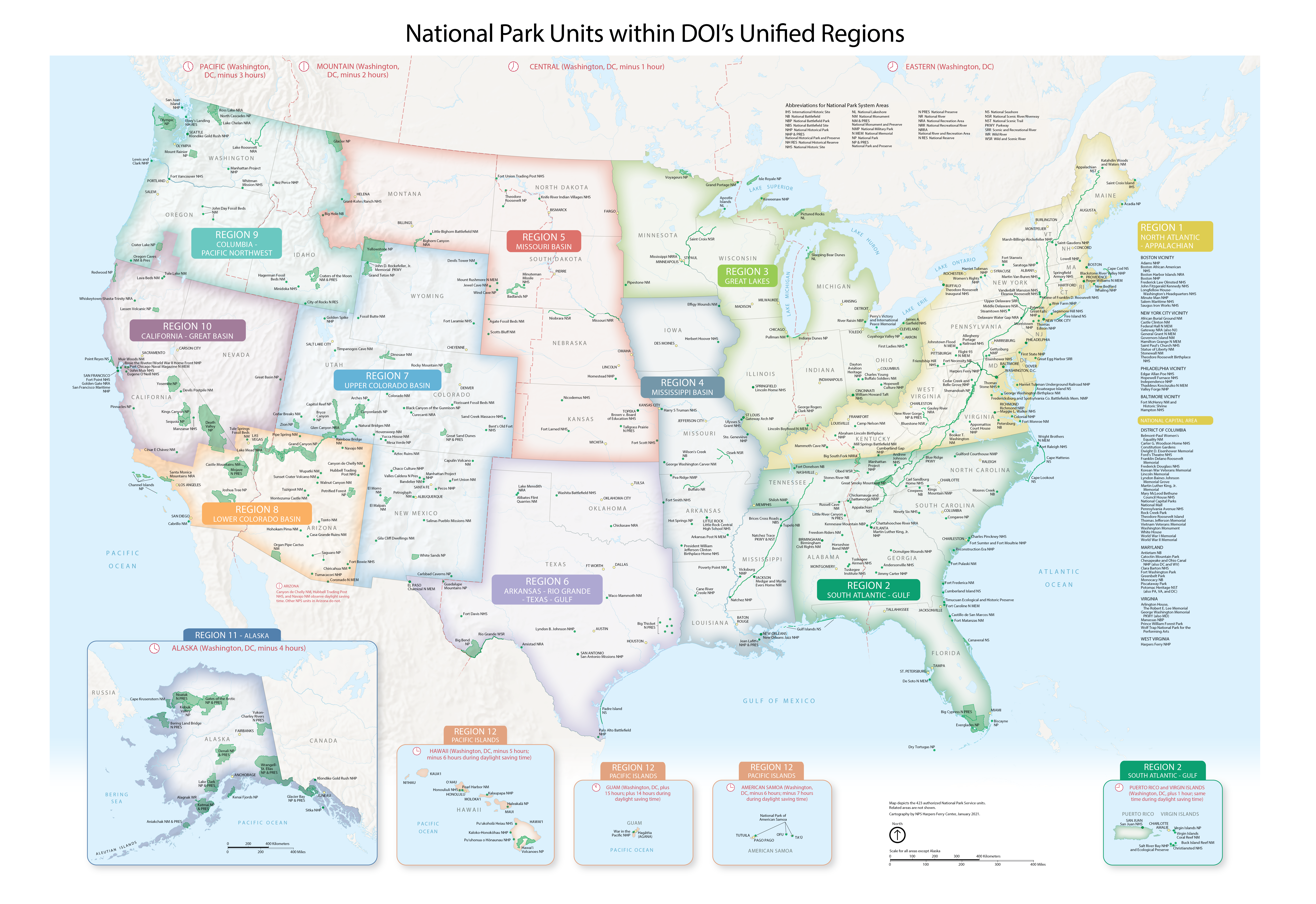
Current map of the National Park Service's administrative regions

The NPS has twelve administrative regions. Each region provides oversight and guidance to the park units within its geographic area. They were established in 2018 following a Department of Interior-wide reorganization that created unified regions for all of the departments' bureaus. The NPS formerly had seven administrative regions.

=== Former regions ===
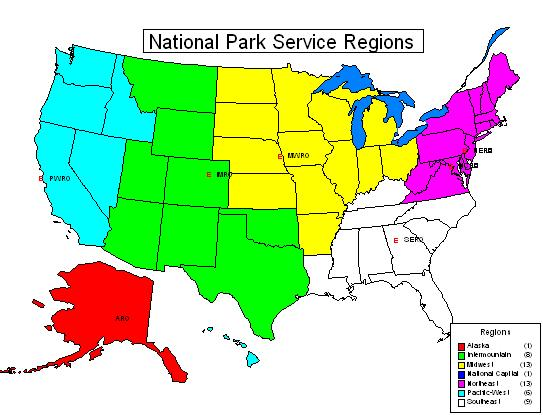
National Park Service regions until 2018

==== Alaska Region ====
The Alaska Region consisted of 16 parks in Alaska. The region was transferred from the Pacific-West Region.

==== Northeast Region ====
The Northeast Region consisted of 73 parks in thirteen states – Maine, New Hampshire, Vermont, New York, Massachusetts, Connecticut, Rhode Island, New Jersey, Pennsylvania, Delaware, Maryland, West Virginia, and Virginia. It was created on October 1, 1995 by the consolidation of the North Atlantic and Mid-Atlantic Regions. Previously a Northeast Region existed (1962–1974) which ceased to exist when the Midwest Region, North Atlantic, and Mid-Atlantic regions were created.
North Atlantic Region The North Atlantic Region consisted of 43 parks in eight states – Maine, New Hampshire, Vermont, New York, Massachusetts, Connecticut, Rhode Island, and New Jersey. It was established on November 30, 1973 with its headquarters in Boston, Massachusetts.

Mid-Atlantic RegionThe Mid-Atlantic Region consisted of 30 parks in five states – Pennsylvania, Maryland, Delaware, West Virginia, and Virginia. The Mid-Atlantic Region was established as Region 5 in 1955, it covered the northeast quarter of the United States. The Name changed in 1962 to Northeast Region. Boundary adjustments on November 15, 1971 added Virginia & Minnesota. A significant boundary adjustment on January 6, 1974 transferred to the Midwest Region the states of Illinois, Indiana, Michigan, Minnesota, Ohio and Wisconsin, and left the region with the states of Delaware, Maryland, Pennsylvania, Virginia and West Virginia. The headquarters remained in Philadelphia, Pennsylvania.

==== Intermountain Region ====
The Intermountain Region consisted of parks in eight states: Montana, Wyoming, Utah, Colorado, Arizona, New Mexico, Oklahoma and Texas. The Intermountain Region was the consolidation of the old Rocky Mountain and Southwest Region with the addition of Arizona from Western Region. Director Roger Kennedy combined the region with Southwest Region on Oct. 1, 1995 creating Intermountain Region.

Rocky Mountain Region The Rocky Mountain Region consisted of 41 parks in seven states: Utah, Colorado, Wyoming, Montana, North Dakota, South Dakota, and a part of Arizona. Pipe Spring NHS is in Arizona, and Glen Canyon NRA is partly in Arizona. Also, some of Yellowstone is in Idaho. It was established by Director Ronald H. Walker on January 6, 1974. The new regions reflect my concern that action authority be brought as close to the local level as possible and are in keeping with President Nixon's policy of standardizing regional office locations within the Federal government, Walker said.

Southwest Region The Southwest Region consisted of 41 parks in six states: Louisiana, Arkansas, Oklahoma, Texas, New Mexico, and the northeast corner of Arizona. The Southwest Region was established on August 1, 1937, as Region Three covering the Southwest states. Name changed to Southwest Region in 1962. Boundary was adjusted on November 15, 1971 deleting most of Arizona and Utah and adding Arkansas and Louisiana. On October 1, 1995 the Southwest Region was consolidated into the new Inter-Mountain Region. The Santa Fe Office became the Colorado Plateau (Southwest) Support Office at that time.

==== Midwest Region ====
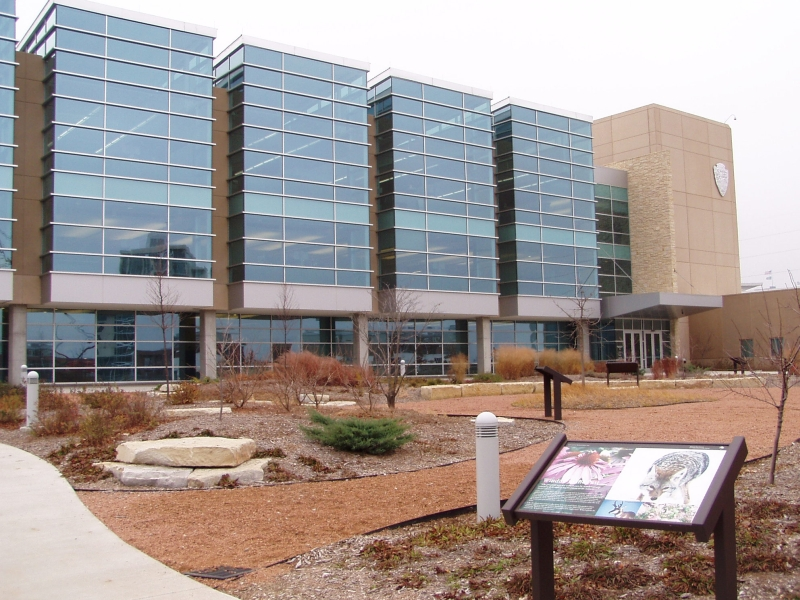
Midwest Regional Office Building

The Midwest Region consisted of 57 park units in thirteen states: Ohio, Indiana, Illinois, Michigan, Wisconsin, Minnesota, Iowa, Missouri, Arkansas, Kansas, Nebraska, South Dakota, and North Dakota. Originally created as Region two on August 1, 1937, it covered the Northern Rocky Mountains, Plains, and Western Great Lakes states. The four Eastern states were transferred to the newly established Region Five in 1955. Name changed to Midwest Region in 1962. Boundary further adjusted on November 15, 1971, deleting Minnesota, and adding Utah and all of Colorado. On January 6, 1974 the Midwest Region was realigned when the states of Colorado, Montana, North Dakota, South Dakota, Utah, and Wyoming were transferred to the newly created Rocky Mountain Region, and the states of Illinois, Indiana, Michigan, Minnesota, Ohio, and Wisconsin were added to the Midwest Region from the Northeast Region. In 1995, the boundary changed to include North Dakota, South Dakota, and Arkansas.

==== National Capital Region ====
The National Capital Region consisted of 26 parks in the greater Washington D.C. area, including parts of Maryland, Virginia and West Virginia. The National Capital Region was revised by Director Kennedy on October 1, 1995 from the old National Capital Region. The older National Capital Region was established January 22, 1962, from the National Capital Parks, District of Columbia-Virginia-Maryland. The National Capital Parks became units of the National Park Service on August 10, 1933 when federal parks under a variety of federal agencies were consolidated under the National Park Service, Department of the Interior.

==== Pacific-West Region ====
The Pacific-West Region consisted of parks in Washington, Oregon, California, Nevada, Idaho, and Hawaii, as well as the territories of Guam, Saipan, and American Samoa. It was created on October 1, 1995, by combining the Western Region and Pacific Northwest Region. It contained 61 units and three regional offices as of January 2005.

Western Region Established on August 1, 1937 as Region Four, it covered the Western states with Hawaii and Alaska. The name was changed to Western Region in 1962. There were boundary changes in December 1969, when Alaska, Washington, Oregon, Idaho, and Lava Beds NM were removed from the region and Lake Mead NRA was added. Another boundary adjustment was made on November 15, 1971, when most of Arizona was added. On October 15, 1995, Western Region was consolidated with Pacific Northwest Region into the Pacific-West Region.

Pacific Northwest Region The Pacific Northwest Region consisted of 16 parks in three states: Washington, Oregon, and Idaho. The Pacific Northwest Region was established on December 30, 1969, as the Northwest Region and included Alaska, Washington Idaho, Oregon, and Lava Beds NM in California. On August 18, 1970 the name was changed to Pacific Northwest Region. In 1980 Alaska was transferred to the newly created Alaska Region. A final change occurred on October 1, 1995 when it was consolidated with the Pacific Northwest Region as the Pacific-West Region.

==== Southeast Region ====
The Southeast Region consisted of 60 parks in nine states and two territories: Kentucky, Tennessee, Mississippi, Louisiana, Alabama, North Carolina, South Carolina, Georgia, and Florida, plus the Virgin Islands, and Puerto Rico. The Southeast Region is the consolidation of the old Southeast Region with the addition of Louisiana. The original Southeast Region was established August 7, 1937, as Region One in Richmond, Virginia and covered the eastern half of the United States, except the National Capital Parks. The Northeast Region was created in 1955 removing the northeastern states to a new region. In 1962, the name was changed to the Southeast Region. Virginia was moved to the Northeast Region on November 15, 1971. The regional headquarters was moved to Atlanta, Georgia on January 9, 1972.
