= List of major springs in Florida =

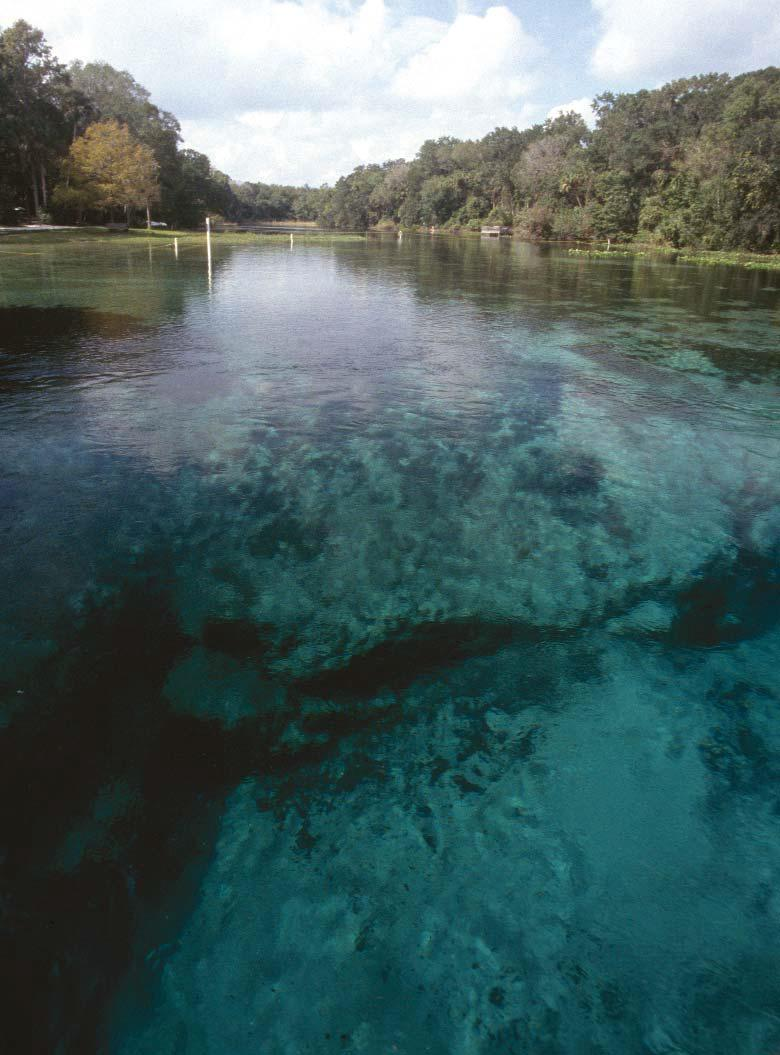
Alexander Spring in Lake County

Geologists from the Florida Department of Environmental Protection claim that the U.S. state of Florida may have the largest convergence of freshwater springs on the planet, with over 700. Hydrological springs are naturally occurring places where water flows from the aquifer (underground) to the surface. There are springs located within 21 Florida State Parks.

In the 1800s, the crystal clear water attracted development; 14 Florida cities have "Spring" in their name. Spring names have been duplicated in different parts of the state, such as Gator and Salt; Blue Spring was so common that the county name was added to differentiate between the seven locations.

The first comprehensive study of Florida's springs was published in 1947. The next update was released 30 years later in the Florida Geological Survey Bulletin No. 31, Revised, "Springs of Florida". In the 1977 Rosenau survey, there were sixteen offshore (under water) springs identified. All but two were situated on the Gulf coast. Since that time, scores of additional springs have been located and are being studied. The most recent compendium of spring data is contained in the 2004 publication, Florida Geological Survey Bulletin 66, and identified 720 springs, of which 33 were first magnitude, 191 were second magnitude, and 151 were third magnitude. Springs are identified by type: river rise (RR) is where a river emerges after flowing underground for a distance; a single spring (SS) has one underground source, but may flow through multiple rock fissures; a group spring (GS) has multiple underground sources; a sink (SK) is an opening in the Earth's surface that occurs from karst processes and/or suffosion.

Volume values listed are the most recent found, mostly after 2000, but water outflows have diminished significantly since the 1990s with drought conditions and increased pumping from the Floridan aquifer. Water flow diminished and stopped completely at several locations, including White Springs and Worthington Springs, where tourists flocked to drink and soak in the mineral water beginning in the late 1800s. The public water plant at Boulware Springs provided water for the city of Gainesville, Florida and the University of Florida until 1913, when reduced outflow required a new water source.

Many of the springs listed herein are indicated as privately owned, which is a misnomer. "Private individuals cannot 'own' a spring that is along/accessible from a navigable waterway. They own the land around it above the normal high water mark." Since the 1972 Clean Water Act (CWA) defined the term "navigable waters", the meaning has been litigated. Following U.S. Supreme Court rulings, the Federal Register published EPA's final definition on November 26, 2008. Section (3) states: "intrastate lakes, rivers, and streams which are utilized by interstate travelers for recreational or other purposes (are navigable waters). Courts have ruled that "shallow streams that are traversable only by canoe have met the test".

Note: The table of contents only applies when the list is sorted by spring name.

- "Mag" refers to the daily magnitude of water flow.
- "Type" denotes RR-River Rise; SS-Single Spring; GS-Group Spring; SK-Sink.
- "Daily flow in millions" is the volume of daily water outflow in millions of gallons/litres.
- "Temp" is water temperature in degrees Fahrenheit/Celsius.
- "Own" shows ownership of surrounding property: S/tate; F/ederal; P/rivate; C/ounty
- Left mouse click on the up/down arrows to sort the list by that column.

Key
†	Spring is located within a Florida State Park
‡	Spring is located within the Ocala National Forest
#	Limited access: requires permission or access from water
§	Volume is for Group, not individual spring
↑	Scuba diving is permitted

Daily magnitude
1st	> 64.6 million gallons (100 ft^{3}/s)
2nd	> 6.46 million gallons (10 ft^{3}/s)
3rd	> 646,000 gallons (1 ft^{3}/s)
4th	> 144,000 gallons (100 gal/min)
Zero	No flow

Mag	Spring name	Outflow body	Type	County	Daily flow in millions	Temp	Own	Photo
1st	Alapaha Rise #	Alapaha River	RR	Hamilton	383.9 US gallons (1,453 L)	70.3 °F (21.3 °C)	P	
1st	Alexander ‡	St. Johns River	SS	Lake	60.9 US gallons (231 L)	74.5 °F (23.6 °C)	F ↑	
2nd	Apopka #	Lake Apopka	SS	Lake	16.0 US gallons (61 L)	75.5 °F (24.2 °C)	P ↑	
2nd	Aucilla (Wacissa)	Wacissa River	GS	Jefferson	189.4 US gallons (717 L) §	68.9 °F (20.5 °C)	P ↑	
2nd	Baltzell	Chipola River	GS	Jackson	31.5 US gallons (119 L)	67.7 °F (19.8 °C)	S/C	
2nd	Beecher #	St. Johns River	SS	Putnam	5.8 US gallons (22 L)	73.1 °F (22.8 °C)	S	
1st	Big Blue (Wacissa)	Wacissa River	GS	Jefferson	189.4 US gallons (717 L) §	68.9 °F (20.5 °C)	P ↑	
1st	Blue †	St. Johns River	SS	Volusia	102.0 US gallons (386 L)	73.0 °F (22.8 °C)	S ↑	
3rd	Blue (Levy County)	Waccasassa River	SS	Levy	4.42 US gallons (16.7 L)	70.9 °F (21.6 °C)	C	
1st	Blue Grotto (Silver) †	Silver River	GS	Marion	359.3 US gallons (1,360 L) §	74.3 °F (23.5 °C)	P	
2nd	Blue Hole (Florida Caverns State Park) †	Chipola River	SS	Jackson	12.71 US gallons (48.1 L)	67.80 °F (19.89 °C)	S	
1st	Blue Hole (Ichetucknee) †	Ichetucknee River	GS	Columbia	130.2 US gallons (493 L) §	71.4 °F (21.9 °C)	S ↑	
4th	Boulware	Paynes Prairie	SS	Alachua	0.2 US gallons (0.76 L)	72.0 °F (22.2 °C)	C	
2nd	Branford	Suwannee River	SS	Suwannee	4.3 US gallons (16 L)	69.5 °F (20.8 °C)	C	
2nd	Buckhorn Main #	Alafia River	GS	Hillsborough	9.7 US gallons (37 L)	76.5 °F (24.7 °C)	P	
2nd	Bugg #	Lake Denham	SS	Lake	5.5 US gallons (21 L)	74.2 °F (23.4 °C)	P	
1st	Cedar Head (Ichetucknee) †	Ichetucknee River	GS	Columbia	130.2 US gallons (493 L) §	71.4 °F (21.9 °C)	S	
1st	Chassahowitzka	Chassahowitzka River	GS	Citrus	34.3 US gallons (130 L)	73.4 °F (23.0 °C)	S ↑	
2nd	Citrus Blue	Withlacoochee River	SS	Citrus	10.5 US gallons (40 L)	72.8 °F (22.7 °C)	P ↑	
2nd	Columbia #	Santa Fe River	SS	Columbia	25.5 US gallons (97 L)	72.3 °F (22.4 °C)	P	
2nd	Copper	Suwannee River	GS	Dixie	8.8 US gallons (33 L)	71.1 °F (21.7 °C)	P	
NA	Cow #	Suwannee River	SK	Lafayette	NA	71.8 °F (22.1 °C)	P ↑	
2nd	Crystal Springs#	Hillsborough River	SS	Pasco	30.0 US gallons (114 L)	72 °F (22 °C)	P	
1st	Cypress #	Holmes Creek; Choctawhatchee River	SS	Washington	65.3 US gallons (247 L)	67.7 °F (19.8 °C)	P	
2nd	De Leon †	Spring Garden Creek; St. Johns River	SS	Volusia	17.6 US gallons (67 L)	73.3 °F (22.9 °C)	S ↑	
NA	Devil's Den	None	SK	Levy	NA	72.0 °F (22.2 °C)	P ↑	
2nd	Devil's Ear/Eye/Little	Santa Fe River	GS	Gilchrist	17.8 US gallons (67 L)	72.6 °F (22.6 °C)	P ↑	
1st	Emerald (Gainer #2)	Econfina Creek	GS	Bay	124.6 US gallons (472 L) §	70.5 °F (21.4 °C)	P ↑	
2nd	Ellaville	Suwannee River	SS	Suwannee	26.3 US gallons (100 L)	73.2 °F (22.9 °C)	P ↑	
1st	Falmouth	Karst fenster	SS	Suwannee	102.8 US gallons (389 L)	69.3 °F (20.7 °C)	S	
1st	Fanning †	Suwannee River	SS	Levy	33.3 US gallons (126 L)	72.9 °F (22.7 °C)	P	
2nd	Fenney #	Shady Brook; Lake Panasoffkee	SS	Sumter	9.0 US gallons (34 L)	73.6 °F (23.1 °C)	P	
2nd	Fern Hammock ‡	Juniper Creek; Lake George	GS	Marion	6.9 US gallons (26 L)	71.7 °F (22.1 °C)	F	
1st	Gainer #3	Econfina Creek	GS	Bay	124.6 US gallons (472 L) §	70.9 °F (21.6 °C)	P/S ↑	
4th	Gator #	Hammock Creek	SS	Hernando	0.2 US gallons (0.76 L)	65.5 °F (18.6 °C)	P ↑	
2nd	Gilchrist Blue	Santa Fe River	GS	Gilchrist	6.9 US gallons (26 L)	72.8 °F (22.7 °C)	P ↑	
2nd	Gemini Springs	Lake Monroe	GS	Volusia	6.5 US gallons (25 L)	72 °F (22 °C)	C	
2nd	Ginnie	Santa Fe River	GS	Gilchrist	37.6 US gallons (142 L)	72.5 °F (22.5 °C)	P ↑	
4th	Glen	Hogtown Creek	SS	Alachua	0.1 US gallons (0.38 L)	71.8 °F (22.1 °C)	P	
3rd	Green Cove	St. Johns River	SS	Clay	1.8 US gallons (6.8 L)	75.9 °F (24.4 °C)	C	
3rd	Green Springs	Lake Monroe	SS	Volusia	5.98 US gallons (22.6 L)	72 °F (22 °C)	C	
2nd	Guaranto	Suwannee River	SS	Dixie	6.0 US gallons (23 L)	73.0 °F (22.8 °C)	C	
2nd	Hardee	Withlacoochee River	SS	Hamilton	17.5 US gallons (66 L)	76.6 °F (24.8 °C)	S	
2nd	Hart	Suwannee River	GS	Gilchrist	26.7 US gallons (101 L)	71.9 °F (22.2 °C)	C ↑	
2nd	Hernando Salt #	Mud River	SS	Hernando	21.3 US gallons (81 L)	74.9 °F (23.8 °C)	P ↑	
1st	Holton Creek Rise #	Suwannee River	RR	Hamilton	157 US gallons (590 L)	71.8 °F (22.1 °C)	S	
1st	Homosassa †	Homosassa River	GS	Citrus	56.2 US gallons (213 L)	74.3 °F (23.5 °C)	S	
2nd	Hornsby #	Santa Fe River	SS	Alachua	32.9 US gallons (125 L)	72.5 °F (22.5 °C)	P ↑	
2nd	Hunter (Kings Bay)	Crystal River	GS	Citrus	630.2 US gallons (2,386 L) §	73.4 °F (23.0 °C)	C/P	
1st	Ichetucknee †	Ichetucknee River	GS	Columbia	130.2 US gallons (493 L) §	71.5 °F (21.9 °C)	S	
1st	Jackson Blue	Merritt's Millpond; Chipola River	GS	Jackson	41.1 US gallons (156 L)	69.7 °F (20.9 °C)	S/C	
2nd	Juniper ‡	Juniper Creek; Lake George	GS	Marion	5.3 US gallons (20 L)	71.6 °F (22.0 °C)	F	
1st	Kings Bay	Crystal River	GS	Citrus	630.2 US gallons (2,386 L) §	73.2 °F (22.9 °C)	S/P	
1st	Kini/Upper River Sink	Karst fenster	SK	Wakulla	113.8 US gallons (431 L)	69.8 °F (21.0 °C)	P	
Zero	Kissingen	Peace River	GS	Polk	0.0 US gallons (0 L)	72.0 °F (22.2 °C)	P	
1st	Lafayette Blue †	Suwannee River	SS	Lafayette	29.7 US gallons (112 L)	71.1 °F (21.7 °C)	S ↑	
4th	Levy Blue #	Waccasassa River	SS	Levy	1.1 US gallons (4.2 L)	69.8 °F (21.0 °C)	C	
1st	Lime Sink Run †	Suwannee River	SS	Suwannee	111.8 US gallons (423 L)	72.2 °F (22.3 °C)	S	
2nd	Lithia Major, Minor	Alafia River	GS	Hillsborough	19.7 US gallons (75 L)	77.2 °F (25.1 °C)	C	
3rd	Little #	Weeki Wachee River	SS	Hernando	3.4 US gallons (13 L)	74.6 °F (23.7 °C)	P ↑	
2nd	Little River	Suwannee River	SS	Suwannee	54.9 US gallons (208 L)	72.1 °F (22.3 °C)	S ↑	
1st	Madison Blue †	Withlacoochee River	SS	Madison	46.1 US gallons (175 L)	70.3 °F (21.3 °C)	S/C ↑	
4th	Magnolia #	Hammock Creek	SS	Hernando	0.3 US gallons (1.1 L)	74.3 °F (23.5 °C)	P	
2nd	Manatee †	Suwannee River	SS	Levy	99.5 US gallons (377 L)	72.5 °F (22.5 °C)	S ↑	
1st	McCormick (Gainer #1)	Econfina Creek	GS	Bay	124.6 US gallons (472 L) §	70.8 °F (21.6 °C)	P ↑	
1st	Morrison	Choctawhatchee River	SS	Walton	40.6 US gallons (154 L)	67.8 °F (19.9 °C)	S/C ↑	
1st	Natural Bridge †	Karst fenster St. Marks River	SS	Leon	98.2 US gallons (372 L)	68.1 °F (20.1 °C)	P	
1st	Nutall Rise	Aucilla River	RR	Jefferson	232.7 US gallons (881 L)	70.3 °F (21.3 °C)	P	
3rd	Orange #	Orange Creek; Oklawaha River	GS	Marion	1.9 US gallons (7.2 L)	74.0 °F (23.3 °C)	P	
2nd	Otter	Suwannee River	SS	Gilchrist	3.1 US gallons (12 L)	72.7 °F (22.6 °C)	P	
NA	Paradise	None	SK	Marion	NA	73.0 °F (22.8 °C)	P ↑	
3rd	Peacock †	Suwannee River	GS	Suwannee	5.7 US gallons (22 L)	69.5 °F (20.8 °C)	S ↑	
2nd	Pitt	Econfina Creek	GS	Walton	3.6 US gallons (14 L)	71.6 °F (22.0 °C)	C	
2nd	Poe	Santa Fe River	SS	Alachua	3.9 US gallons (15 L)	72.5 °F (22.5 °C)	C	
2nd	Ponce de Leon †	Sandy Creek; Choctawhatchee River	GS	Holmes	5.7 US gallons (22 L)	67.8 °F (19.9 °C)	S	
1st	Rainbow †	Rainbow River; Withlacoochee River	GS	Marion	409.8 US gallons (1,551 L)	74.1 °F (23.4 °C)	S/P	
1st	Roaring (Ichetucknee) †	Ichetucknee River	GS	Columbia	130.2 US gallons (493 L) §	70.0 °F (21.1 °C)	S	
2nd	Rock	Rock Springs Run Wekiva River	SS	Orange	30.0 US gallons (114 L)	74.9 °F (23.8 °C)	C	
2nd	Rock Bluff	Suwannee River	GS	Gilchrist	17.9 US gallons (68 L)	71.6 °F (22.0 °C)	P ↑	
Zero	Rossetter	Withlacoochee River	SS	Hamilton	0.0 US gallons (0 L)	76.6 °F (24.8 °C)	S	
3rd	Royal	Suwannee River	SS	Suwannee	1.6 US gallons (6.1 L)	72.7 °F (22.6 °C)	C	
2nd	Running East, West #	Suwannee River	GS	Lafayette; Suwannee	18.2 US gallons (69 L)	71.8 °F (22.1 °C)	P ↑	
2nd	Salt (Marion) ‡	Lake George	SS	Marion	49.4 US gallons (187 L)	74.5 °F (23.6 °C)	F	
2nd	Sanlando #	Wekiva River	SS	Seminole	8.5 US gallons (32 L)	76.4 °F (24.7 °C)	P	
2nd	Santa Fe #	Santa Fe River	SS	Columbia	81.4 US gallons (308 L)	73.0 °F (22.8 °C)	P ↑	
2nd	Santa Fe Rise †	Santa Fe River	RR	Alachua	48.5 US gallons (184 L)	72.5 °F (22.5 °C)	S ↑	
2nd	Shangri La #	Merritt's Millpond; Chipola River	SS	Jackson	2.5 US gallons (9.5 L)	69.7 °F (20.9 °C)	P ↑	
1st	Silver †	Silver River; Oklawaha River	GS	Marion	359.3 US gallons (1,360 L) §	73.8 °F (23.2 °C)	S	
1st	Silver Glen ‡	St. Johns River	GS	Marion	70.5 US gallons (267 L)	74.1 °F (23.4 °C)	F	
1st	Siphon Creek Rise #	Santa Fe River	RR	Gilchrist	77.6 US gallons (294 L)	72.4 °F (22.4 °C)	S	
1st	Spring Creek	Apalachee Bay	SS	Wakulla	198.4 US gallons (751 L)	70.9 °F (21.6 °C)	S/P	
1st	St. Marks Rise #	St. Marks River	RR	Leon	292.1 US gallons (1,106 L)	68.8 °F (20.4 °C)	P	
2nd	Starbuck #	Wekiva River	SS	Seminole	9.4 US gallons (36 L)	76.1 °F (24.5 °C)	P	
1st	Steinhatchee Rise	Steinhatchee River	RR	Taylor; Dixie	226.2 US gallons (856 L)	70.0 °F (21.1 °C)	S	
2nd	Sun	Suwannee River	SS	Gilchrist	4.5 US gallons (17 L)	72.7 °F (22.6 °C)	P	
2nd	Suwanacoochee	Withlacoochee River	SS	Suwannee	0.3 US gallons (1.1 L)	69.9 °F (21.1 °C)	S ↑	
2nd	Suwannee	Suwannee River	GS	Suwannee	9.1 US gallons (34 L)	72.5 °F (22.5 °C)	S	
2nd	Suwannee Blue #	Suwannee River	SS	Suwannee	8.6 US gallons (33 L)	70.9 °F (21.6 °C)	P	
1st	Tarpon Hole (Kings Bay)	Crystal River	GS	Citrus	630.2 US gallons (2,386 L) §	73.2 °F (22.9 °C)	C/P	
2nd	Telford	Suwannee River	SS	Suwannee	20.1 US gallons (76 L)	70.2 °F (21.2 °C)	P	
2nd	Three Sisters (Kings Bay)	Crystal River	GS	Citrus	630.2 US gallons (2,386 L) §	73.3 °F (22.9 °C)	P	
1st	Treehouse #	Santa Fe River	SS	Alachua	25.8 US gallons (98 L)	71.4 °F (21.9 °C)	P	
1st	Troy †	Suwannee River	SS	Lafayette	98.2 US gallons (372 L)	71.0 °F (21.7 °C)	S ↑	
2nd	Volusia Blue †	St. Johns River	SS	Volusia	56.2 US gallons (213 L)	73.6 °F (23.1 °C)	S ↑	
2nd	Vortex	Blue/Sandy Creek; Choctawhatchee River	SS	Holmes	4.5 US gallons (17 L)	71.6 °F (22.0 °C)	P ↑	
2nd	Wacissa Group	Wacissa River	GS	Jefferson	189.4 US gallons (717 L) §	68.90 °F (20.50 °C)	S/P	
1st	Wakulla †	Wakulla River	SS	Wakulla	252.02 US gallons (954.0 L)	70.2 °F (21.2 °C)	S	
3rd	Waldo #	Fenholloway River	SS	Taylor	0.7 US gallons (2.6 L)	74.5 °F (23.6 °C)	P	
3rd	Wall	Boggy Bayou	SS	Pinellas	4.2 US gallons (16 L)	74.0 °F (23.3 °C)	C	
3rd	Warm Mineral	Myakka River	GS	Sarasota	5.5 US gallons (21 L)	86.4 °F (30.2 °C)	P	
1st	Weeki Wachee †	Weeki Wachee River	SS	Hernando	104.0 US gallons (394 L)	74.7 °F (23.7 °C)	S ↑	
2nd	Wekiva	Wekiva River (Waccasassa River tributary)	SS	Levy	16.82 US gallons (63.7 L)	73.2 °F (22.9 °C)	P	
2nd	Wekiwa †	Wekiva River	SS	Orange; Seminole	43.0 US gallons (163 L)	74.1 °F (23.4 °C)	S	
3rd	Welaka	St. Johns River	SS	Putnam	5.1 US gallons (19 L)	74.7 °F (23.7 °C)	P	
2nd	White	Suwannee River	SS	Hamilton	26.1 US gallons (99 L)	68.0 °F (20.0 °C)	S	
2nd	Williford #	Econfina Creek	GS	Washington; Bay	16.5 US gallons (62 L)	70.0 °F (21.1 °C)	S	
3rd	Worthington	Santa Fe River	SS	Union	0.2 US gallons (0.76 L)	68.0 °F (20.0 °C)	C	

== See also ==
- List of rivers in Florida
- Outstanding Florida Waters
