= Florida Surface Water Improvement and Management Act of 1987 =

Florida state legislation

The Surface Water Improvement and Management Act of 1987 was a law passed by the Florida Legislature in order to protect surface waters of, which include estuaries, rivers, lakes, and streams. The act created the Surface Water Improvement and Management Program, which seeks to control nonpoint source pollution.

== Administration ==
The five water districts of Florida are responsible for the administration of the SWIM Program. The water districts perform these duties in consultation with other federal, state, and local agencies.

== SWIM Priority Water Bodies ==
=== Northwest Florida Water Management District ===
Apalachicola River and Bay Watershed, Pensacola Bay System, Choctawhatchee River and Bay Watershed, St. Andrew Bay Watershed, St. Marks River and Apalachee Bay Watershed, Ochlockonee River and Bay Watershed, and Perdido River and Bay Watershed.

=== South Florida Water Management District ===
Tier 1: Biscayne Bay, Florida Keys, Lake Istokpoga, Lake Okeechobee, Lake Trafford, Lower Charlotte Harbor (incl. Charlotte Harbor, Estero Bay and Caloosahatchee River & Estuary), Loxahatchee River, and St. Lucie Estuary. Tier 2: Florida Bay, Indian River Lagoon, Lake Worth Lagoon, Naples Bay/Gordon River, and Rookery Bay/Marco. Tier 3: Lake Arbuckle, Lake Butler, Lake Weohyakapka, and Upper Kissimmee Chain of Lakes.

=== Southwest Florida Water Management District ===
Tampa Bay, Rainbow River, Crystal River/Kings Bay, Lake Panasoffkee, Charlotte Harbor, Lake Tarpon, Lake Thonotosassa, Winter Haven Chain of Lakes, Sarasota Bay, Weeki Wachee River, Chassahowitzka River, Homosassa River.

=== St. Johns River Water Management District ===
Upper St. Johns River, Lower St. Johns River, Lake Apopka, Upper Ocklawaha, Middle St. Johns River, Northern Coastal Basin, and Orange Creek.

=== Suwannee River Water Management District ===
Alligator Lake, Aucilla River, Coastal Rivers, Santa Fe River, Suwannee River, and Waccasassa River.
