= Homosassa Springs =

Homosassa Springs may refer to several places:

- Homosassa Springs, Florida, U.S.
- Homosassa Springs, FL Metropolitan Statistical Area, geographically identical to Citrus County, Florida, U.S.
- Homosassa Springs Wildlife State Park, near Homosassa Springs, Florida, U.S.
