= Northwest Florida Water Management District =

Statewide regulatory entity in Florida

The Northwest Florida Water Management District (NWFWMD) stretches from the St. Marks River Basin in Jefferson County to the Perdido River in Escambia County. The District is one of five water management districts in Florida created by the Water Resources Act of 1972. The District has worked for decades to protect and manage water resources in a sustainable manner for the continued welfare of people and natural systems across its 16-county region. It serves Bay, Calhoun, Escambia, Franklin, Gadsden, Gulf, Holmes, Jackson, Leon, Liberty, Okaloosa, Santa Rosa, Wakulla, Walton, Washington and western Jefferson Counties.

Within the District's 11,305-square-mile (29,280 km^{2}) area, there are several major hydrologic (or drainage) basins: Perdido River and Bay System, Pensacola Bay System (Escambia, Blackwater and Yellow Rivers), Choctawhatchee River and Bay System, St. Andrew Bay System, Apalachicola River and Bay System and St. Marks River Basin (Wakulla River).

A nine-member Governing Board, appointed by the Governor and confirmed by the Florida Senate, guides District activities. Board members serve four-year terms without compensation and may be reappointed. An Executive Director oversees a staff of approximately 100 that includes hydrologists, geologists, biologists, engineers, planners, foresters, land managers and various administrative personnel.

== Lands ==
The district reports having acquired more than 85 percent of the floodplains along the Choctawhatchee River, Escambia River and Econfina Creek have been acquired by the district.

Land Management

=== Recreation ===
Recreational opportunities are available on NWFWMD land along the following waterways: springs, and pristine bottomland hardwood and associated upland forests.

- Apalachicola River
- Chipola River
- Choctawhatchee River
- Econfina Creek
- Escambia River
- Holmes Creek
- Perdido River
- Yellow River

=== Acreages by basin ===
Conservation acreages by basin are:

- Perdido River 5,454
- Escambia River 34,919
- Garcon Point 3,245
- Blackwater River 380
- Yellow River 17,725
- Choctawhatchee River/Holmes Creek 60,595
- Econfina Creek 41,135
- West Bay
- 719
- Upper Chipola River 7,377
- Apalachicola River 35,506
- Lake Jackson 516
- Conservation Easements 11,000

== See also ==
- St. Johns River Water Management District
- South Florida Water Management District
- Southwest Florida Water Management District
- Suwannee River Water Management District
