= Lake Butler, Florida =

Lake Butler, Florida may refer to the following places:

- Lake Butler, Orange County, Florida, an unincorporated community
- Lake Butler, Union County, Florida, a city
- Lake Butler (Polk County, Florida), a lake
