= Three Sisters Springs (Florida) =

Natural springs in Crystal River, Florida, US

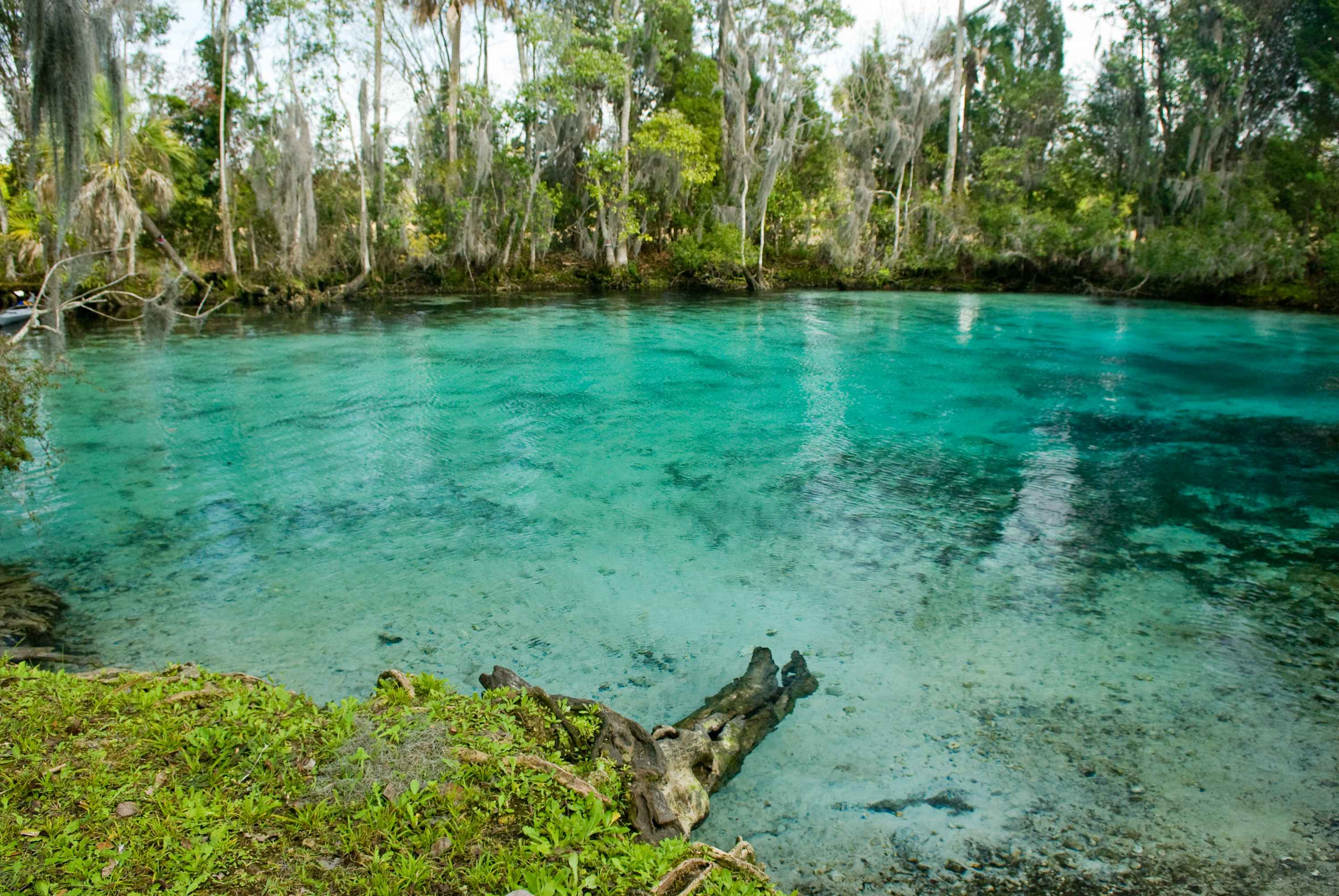
- Three Sisters Springs near Crystal River National Wildlife Refuge

- Location within Florida Location within the United States
- Location: Citrus County, Florida, United States
- Nearest city: Crystal River, Florida
- Coordinates: 28.888725°N 82.589191°W
- Owner: District and the City of Crystal River
- Administrator: City of Crystal River, U.S. Fish and Wildlife Service

Three Sisters Springs is located on the Crystal River, in Citrus County, Florida, United States. It is in a natural inlet on the east side of Kings Bay and within the Crystal River National Wildlife Refuge. It contains three spring areas with many sand boils and vents. No matter the "ambient conditions", these springs "maintain a stable temperature of approximately" 23 °C (73 °F). These springs are a winter refuge for manatees; manatee season is from November 15 through March 31. Paddle-craft are not permitted within the Three Sisters during this period.

The land surrounding the springs was privately owned property until it was acquired in 2010 by a partnership between local, state and federal organizations. There is presently no landfall or boat tie-up permitted; the only access to the springs is blocked by concrete posts to stop the boats from entering. Only kayaks, canoes, and swimmers are permitted in the area but only by arriving from outside the park. There is also an observation boardwalk with no access to the water.

== Overview ==
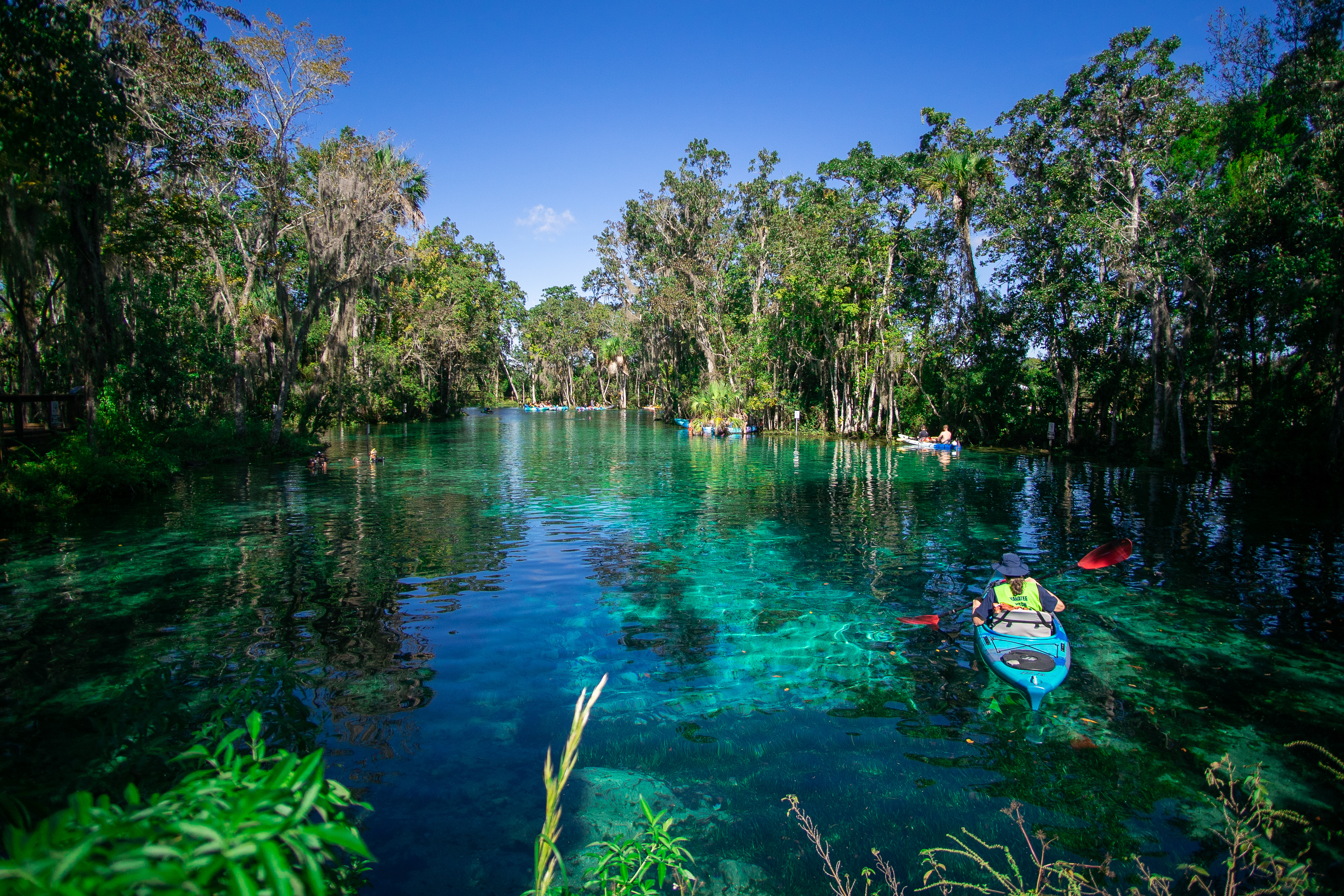
Kayakers at Three Sisters in 2019

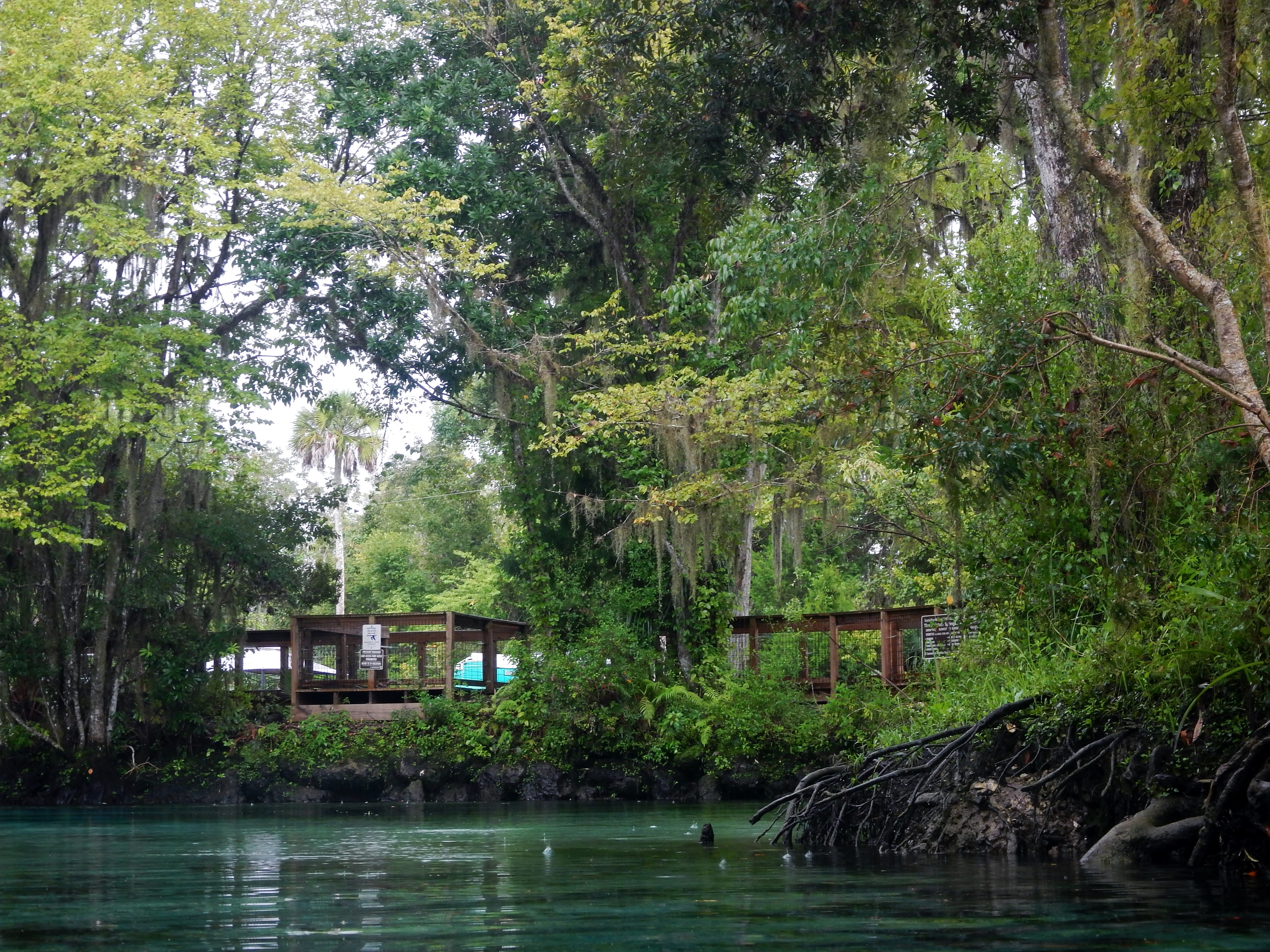
Boardwalk at Three Sisters in 2015

Three Sisters Springs is a 57-acre site which "contains 45 acres of uplands and 12 acres of wetlands, including three second-magnitude springs that serve as a winter refuge for manatees". The springs contain both sand boils and vents. A 2014–15 winter water temperature study determined the average temperature of the Three Sisters Springs was 23.182 °C (73.728 °F). It "lies within the Crystal River National Wildlife Refuge and previously served as a wetland system benefitting Kings Bay".

The springs previously were threatened by development prospects, such as a 2008 condominium proposal. In 2010, a partnership between local, state and federal organizations led to the purchase of the Three Sisters Springs for $10.5 million. Three Sisters Springs became "a protected, national wildlife refuge" managed by the U.S. Fish and Wildlife Service; it is co-owned by the District and the City of Crystal River. The springs were initially only accessible by boat. Following the purchase, a boardwalk around the springs and trolley to the location were added. Due to erosion concerns, in-water access is limited to arrival by boat and there is no land access from the water. Motorized vessels are not permitted within the springs and paddle-craft are not permitted within during manatee season.

Stabilization projects around the shoreline of the springs occurred in 2016 and 2023. The restoration used soil fill with nonwoven fabric to allow tree roots to grow through, with the fabric decaying over time. The soil becomes stabilized after the "tree roots lock together". The project also used limestone boulders and native vegetation with the end result appearing to be "part of the natural landscape". A new visitor center opened in 2023 which made the springs more accessible to tourists.

== Wildlife ==
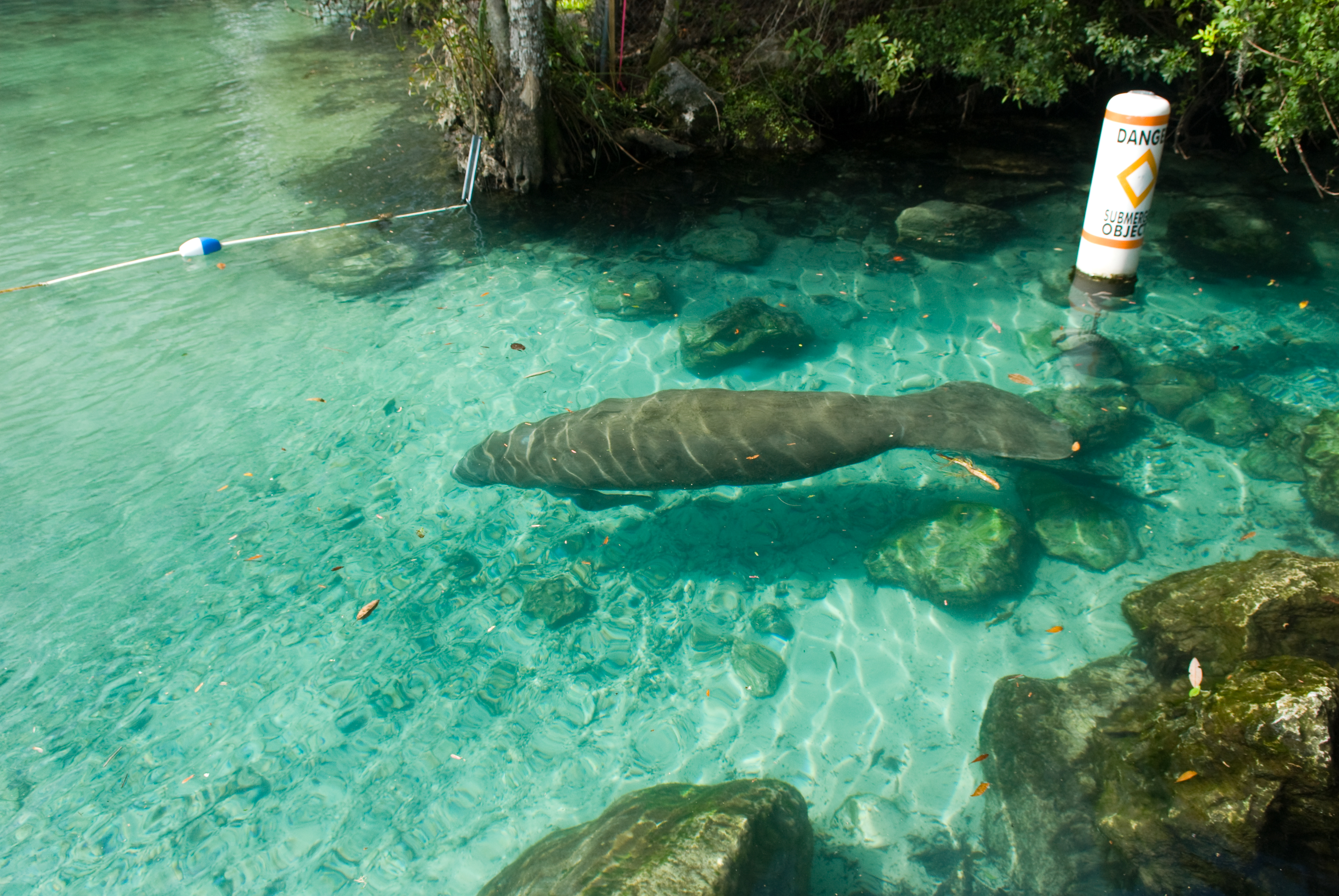
Manatee in the springs in 2008

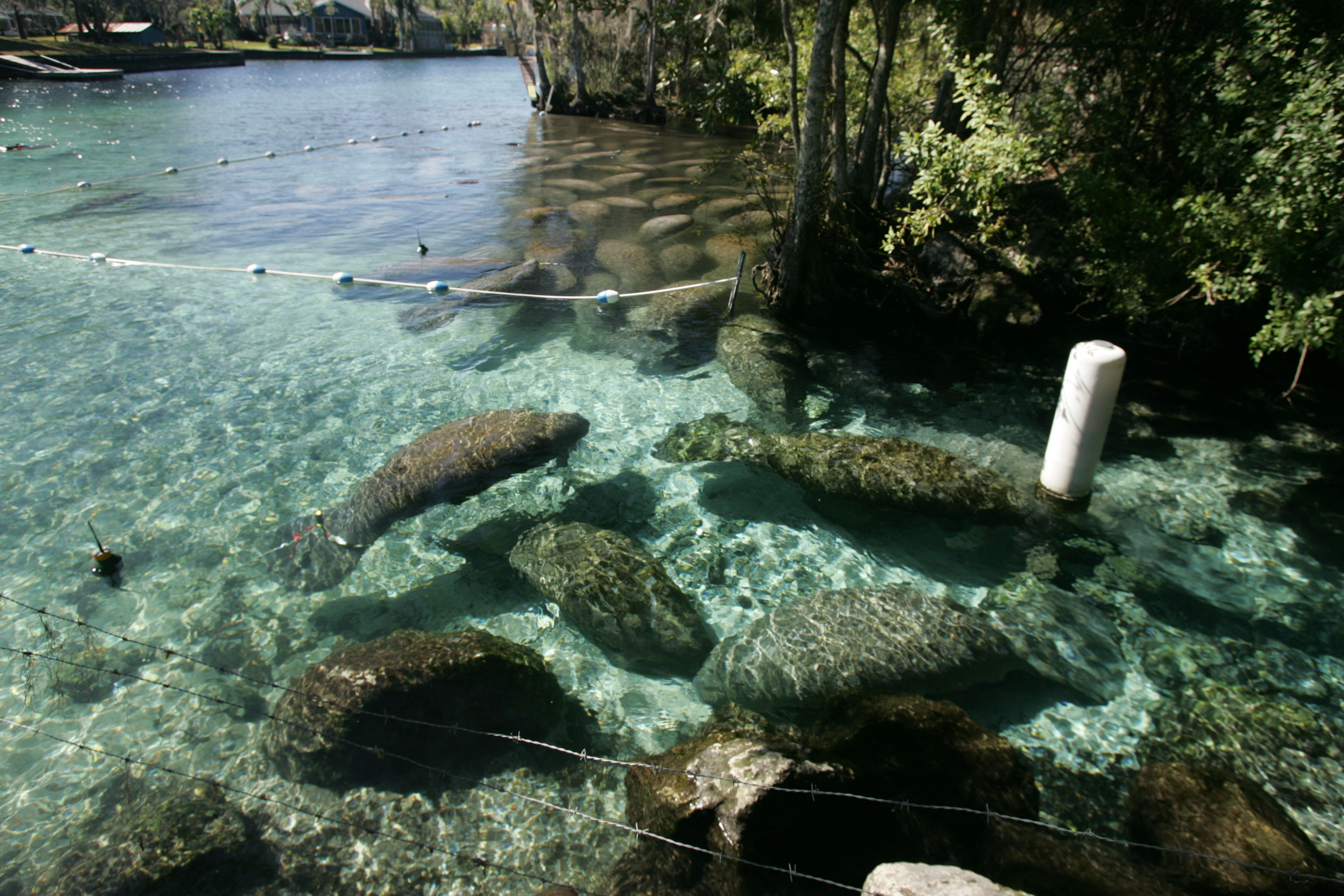
Cluster of manatees in 2010

Three Sisters Springs is home to many manatees and is one of the Crystal River's sanctuaries. It "is the only 'confined-water body in the United States' open for the public to see wintering manatees, according to the U.S. Fish and Wildlife Service". A study on warm water refuge use by manatees in the Crystal River National Wildlife Refuge determined "when ambient temperatures were warmer" (>20 °C (68 °F)), the animals were "found in the Crystal or Salt Rivers or in the Gulf of Mexico" and at "colder ambient water temperatures", the manatees were "found in or near the springs (especially Three Sisters Springs)". At extreme cold temperatures (<10 °C (50 °F)) in the Gulf, the manatee shift towards both the Three Sisters Springs and the Idiot's Delight Spring "increased dramatically". Manatee movement in and out of the Three Sisters Springs is also associated to the tide cycle.

In adherence to the mission of protecting and preserving the manatee and its habitat, the areas around the springs have been designated as manatee sanctuaries and are closed to vessels from November 15 through March 31. However, swimmers are able to enter the spring from the water during this time with possible periodic discretionary closures due to manatee behavior. Visitors can view the manatees in their natural setting from land by use of the observation boardwalk overlooking the spring.

Many species of birds can also be seen at the springs with some "known to have nested on or near Three Sisters Springs". These nesting birds include anhinga, common gallinule, limpkin, mottled duck, osprey, pied-billed grebe, sandhill crane, and sora.

== See also ==
- Homosassa Springs Wildlife State Park
- List of major springs in Florida
