= Gainesville–Hawthorne State Trail =

Rail trail in Florida

- IUCN category V (protected landscape/seascape)
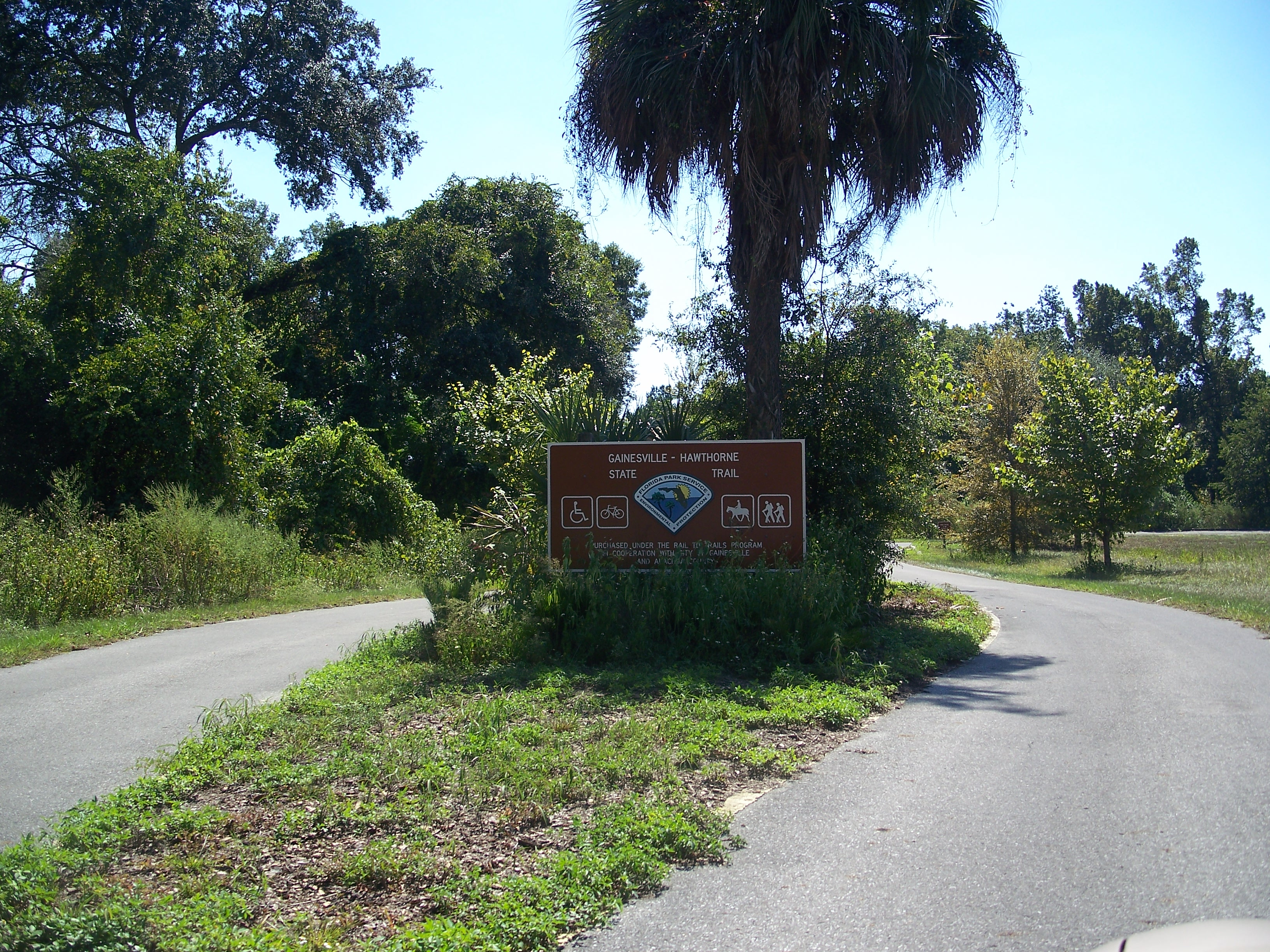
- The east end of the Hawthorne-Gainesville Trail

- Location within Florida Location within the United States
- Interactive map of Gainesville–Hawthorne State Trail
- Location: Alachua County, Florida, USA
- Nearest city: Gainesville, Florida
- Coordinates: 29°35′28″N 82°11′21″W
- Area: 16-mile (26 km) length
- Governing body: Florida Department of Environmental Protection

The Gainesville–Hawthorne State Trail is a paved rail trail in Florida.

It is protected as a 16-mile (26 km) long Florida State Park and runs from the City of Gainesville's Boulware Springs Water Works to the town of Hawthorne. It passes through the Paynes Prairie Preserve State Park and the Lochloosa Wildlife Management Area along a former Atlantic Coast Line Railroad line. The property was purchased by the state of Florida from CSX Transportation with money from the "trails from rails" program in late 1989. The trail opened for use in January 1992.

== History ==
At the entrance of Witness Tree Junction, a trailhead along the Gainesville-Hawthorne State Trail, a trio of live oak trees sport carvings demanding notice of Colonel Daniel Newnan and his 100 soldiers' march to capture runaway Black Seminoles during the Patriot War of 1812. These three trees are also marked by N.R. Gruelle, a surveyor for the Florida Southern Railway (originally the Gainesville, Ocala and Charlotte Harbor Railroad Company), to delineate one end of railroad property.

== Recreational activities ==
Activities include hiking, running, cycling, rollerblading, and horseback riding. A grassy equestrian pathway is available except east of the Lochloosa trailhead.

== Hours and Locations ==
The Boulware Springs trailhead is located at Boulware Springs Nature Park, 3300 S.E. 15th St, Gainesville, and is open from 8 a.m. to 6 p.m. November through April and from 8 a.m. to 8 p.m. May through October.

Other trailheads with parking include (1) intersection of county roads 234 and 2082, Rochelle (at Prairie Creek Preserve); (2) 7902 S.E. 200th Drive, off County Road 2082, west of Hawthorne; and (3) 2182 S.E. 71st Avenue, Hawthorne.

The Paynes Prairie portion of the trail is open from 8 a.m. until sunset, 365 days a year.

== See also ==
- Florida State Parks in Alachua County
- Old Gainesville Depot
- Paynes Prairie Preserve State Park
- Boulware Springs Nature Park
