= Wall Springs Park =

Park in Pinellas County, Florida, United States

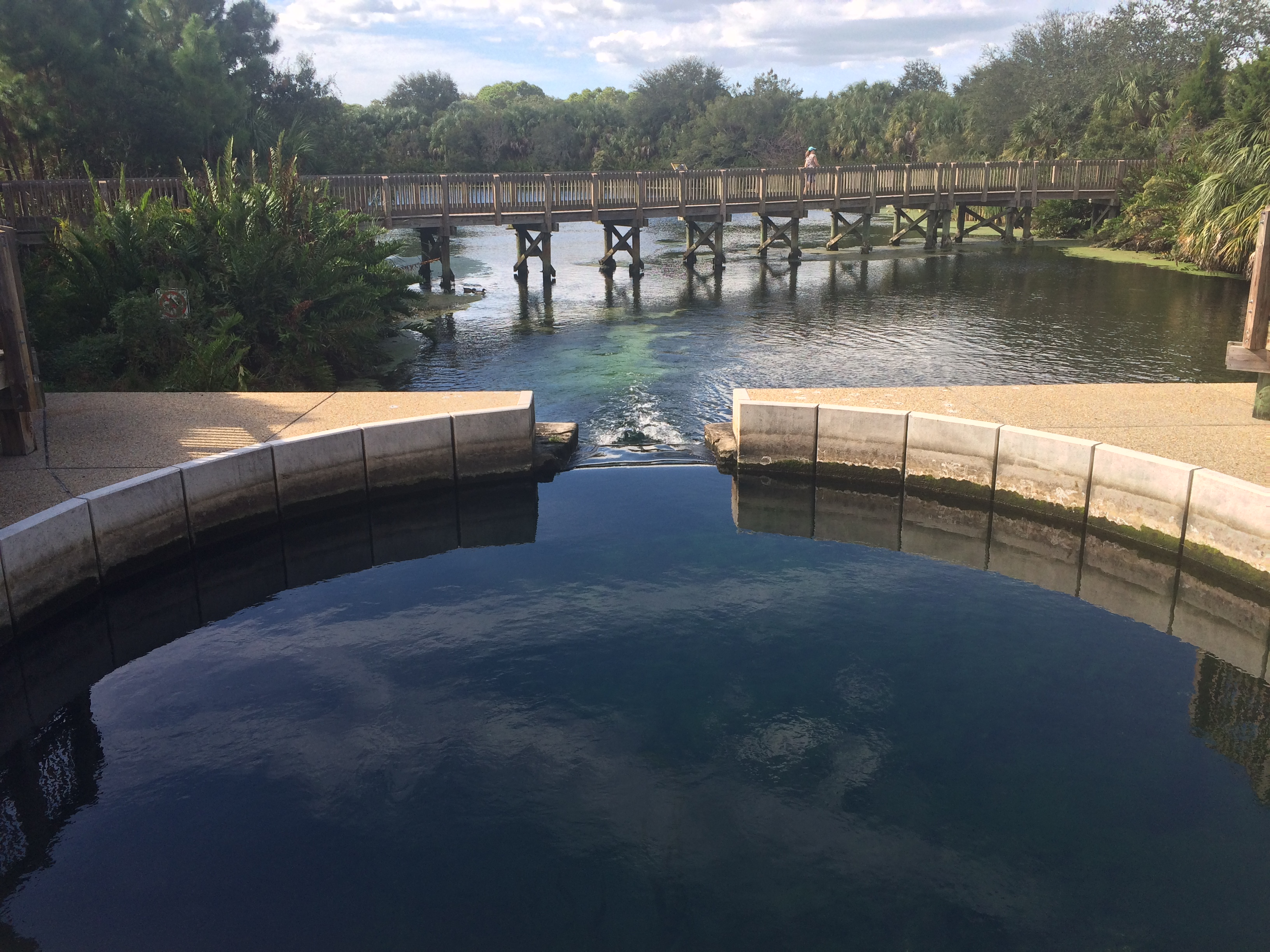
- Interactive map of Wall Springs Park
- Location: Palm Harbor, Florida
- Coordinates: 28.1068°N 82.7714°W
- Created: 1988
- Operator: Pinellas County Parks & Recreation

Wall Springs Park is a 210-acre (0.85 km^{2}) park located in Palm Harbor, Florida. The park includes a historical natural spring which was used as a bathing area from the turn of the 20th century until the 1960s. The park is located in Pinellas County, on the Florida Gulf Coast.

The spring receives water from the Upper Floridan Aquifer through underground caves.

== Amenities ==
From PinellasCounty.org

- Bike Racks
- Boardwalk, Nature Trail
- Educational and Informational Displays
- Fishing - Saltwater License
- Historic Interest
- Multi-purpose Trail
- Parking
- Pier
- A Covered, Barrier-Free Playground
- Restrooms
- Picnic Shelter & Grills
- Wildlife Observation Tower

== Gallery ==
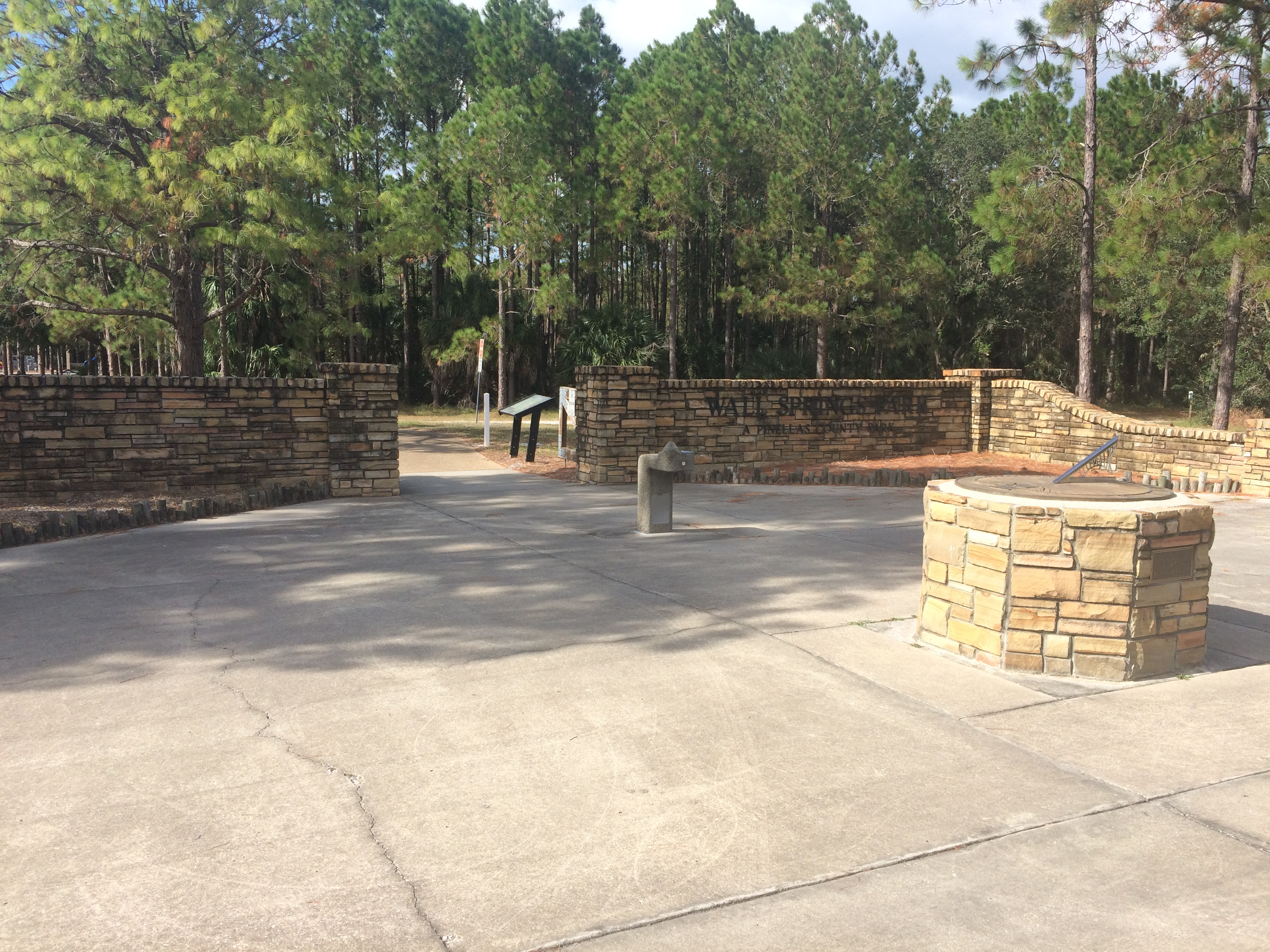
Entrance to the Park from the Pinellas Trail.

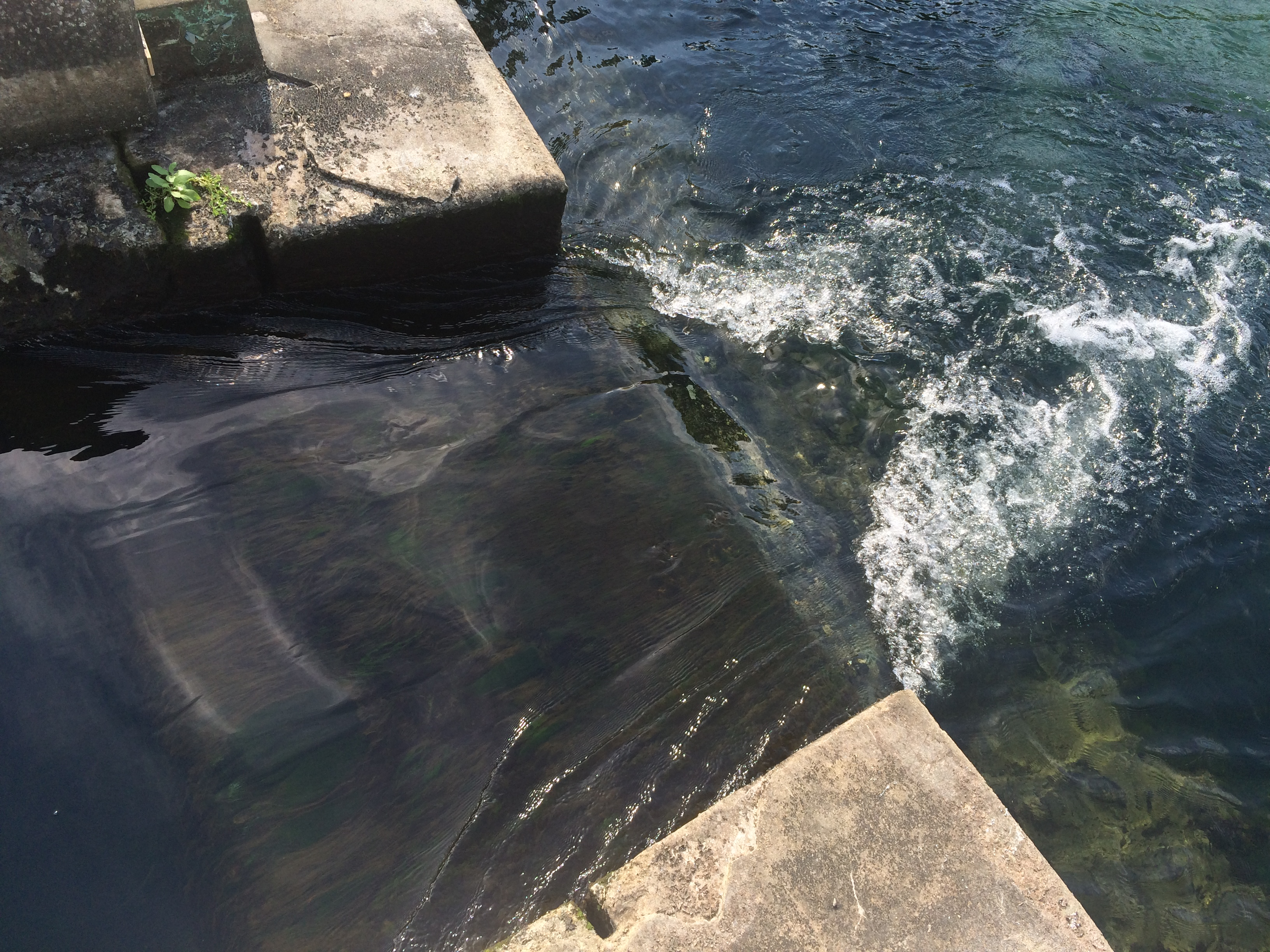
Detail of the spillway from the spring.

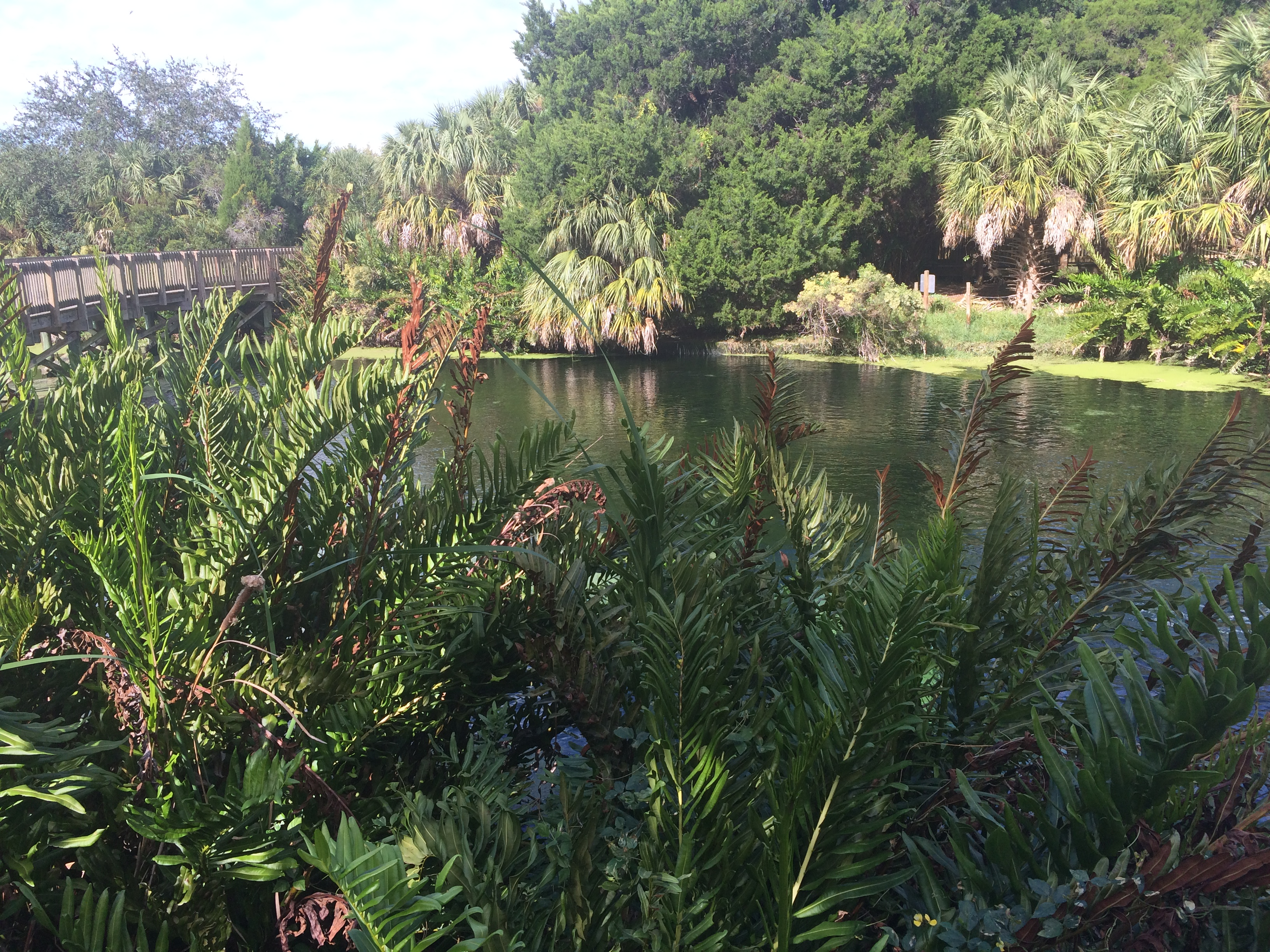
View of the lagoon fed by the spring, Wall Springs Park.

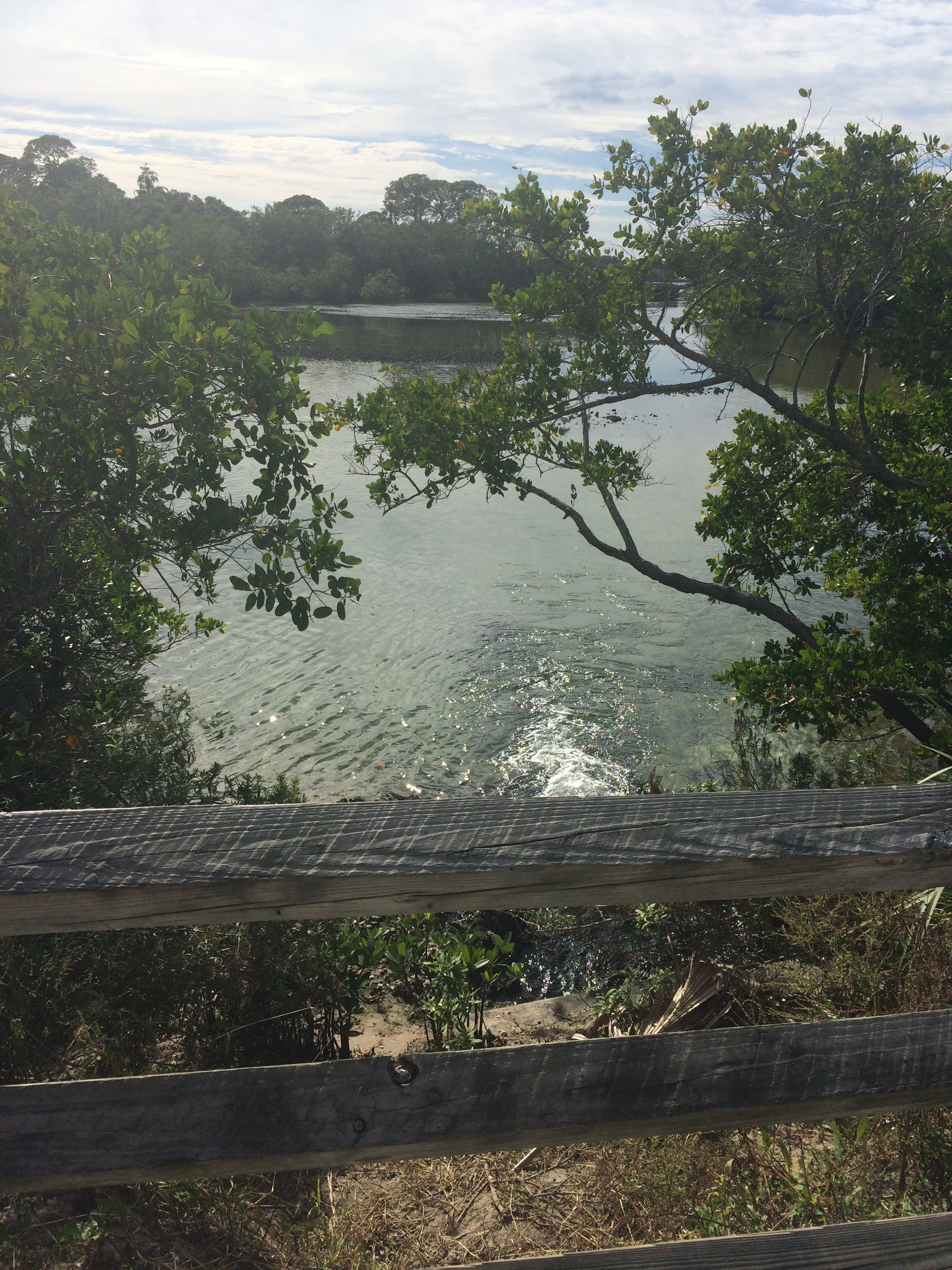
View of the mangroves from the boardwalk, Wall Springs Park.

== See also ==
- List of major springs in Florida
