= Econfina Creek =

River in the Florida Panhandle, United States

Coordinates: 30.352909°N 85.556529°W

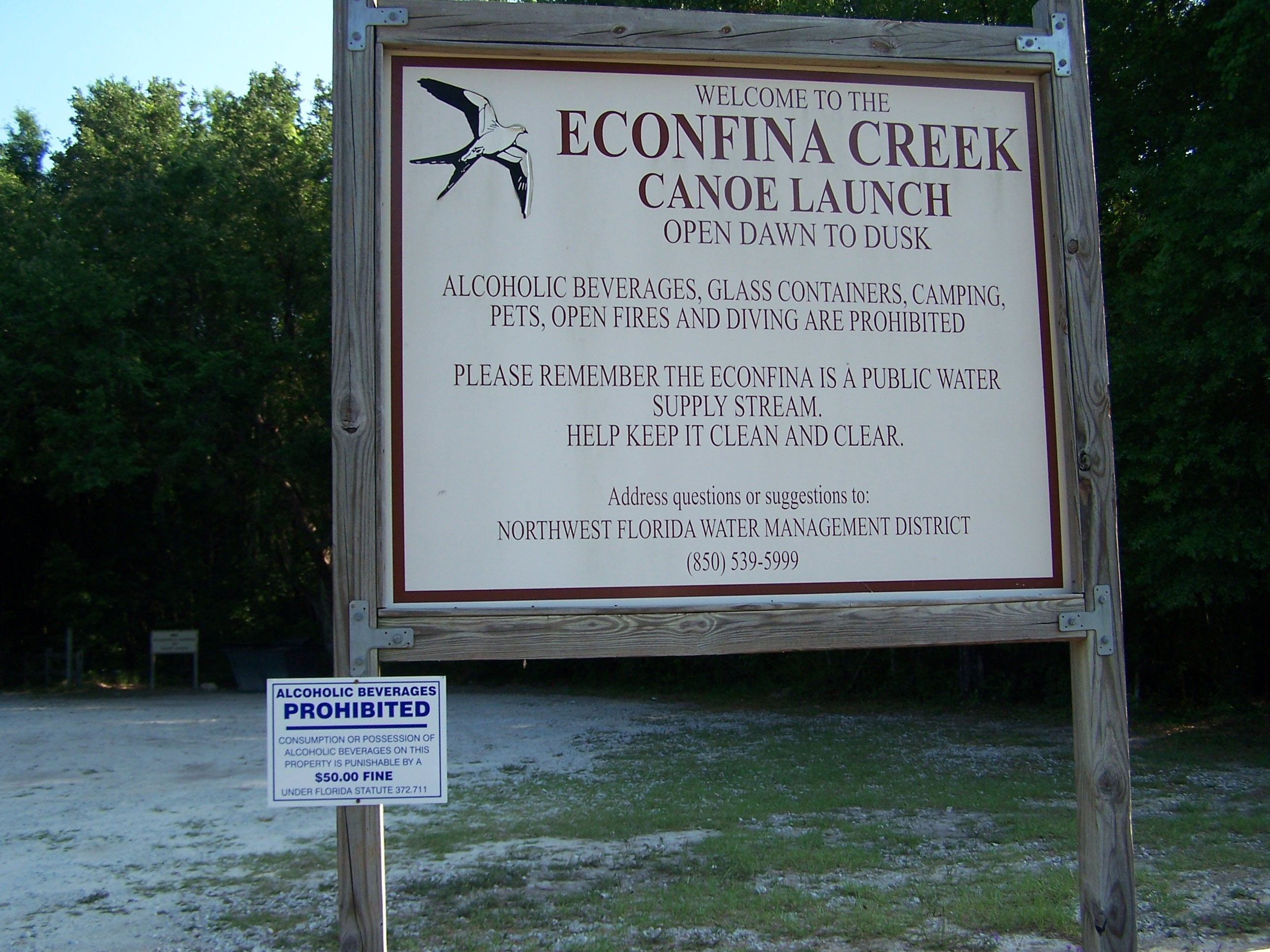
Econfina Creek Canoe Launch

Econfina Creek (pronounced Econ-FINE-uh) is a small river in the middle Florida Panhandle. It flows through hilly country, and has sections of whitewater rapids. Much of its flow comes from springs. The river ends at Deer Point Lake, a reservoir that provides the freshwater supply for Panama City and much of Bay County.

The name "Econfina" derives from the Creek ekana, which means "earthy", and feno, which means "bridge" or "footlog", referring to a natural bridge that crossed the river about 15 miles (24 km) upstream from its mouth until it collapsed in the 19th century. The Pensacola – St. Augustine road (the Bellamy Road) built in the 1820s crossed this natural bridge.

== Course ==
Econfina Creek arises in the southwest corner of Jackson County, flows into Bay County, thence into Washington County, and returns to Bay County to end in Deer Point Lake. Deer Point Lake is a reservoir that empties directly into North Bay, an arm of St. Andrews Bay. Econfina Creek is 26 miles (42 km) long and has a watershed of 275 square miles (710 km^{2}).

Econfina Creek flows through a hilly limestone karst landscape, and there are springs, sinkholes, caves and rock outcrops along the river. One cave by the river is the only known location for a species of snail (Dasyscias franzi) that feeds on wood carried into the cave by beavers. The vegetation along the river includes plants typical of the Appalachian Mountains, but rarely found in Florida.

=== Springs ===
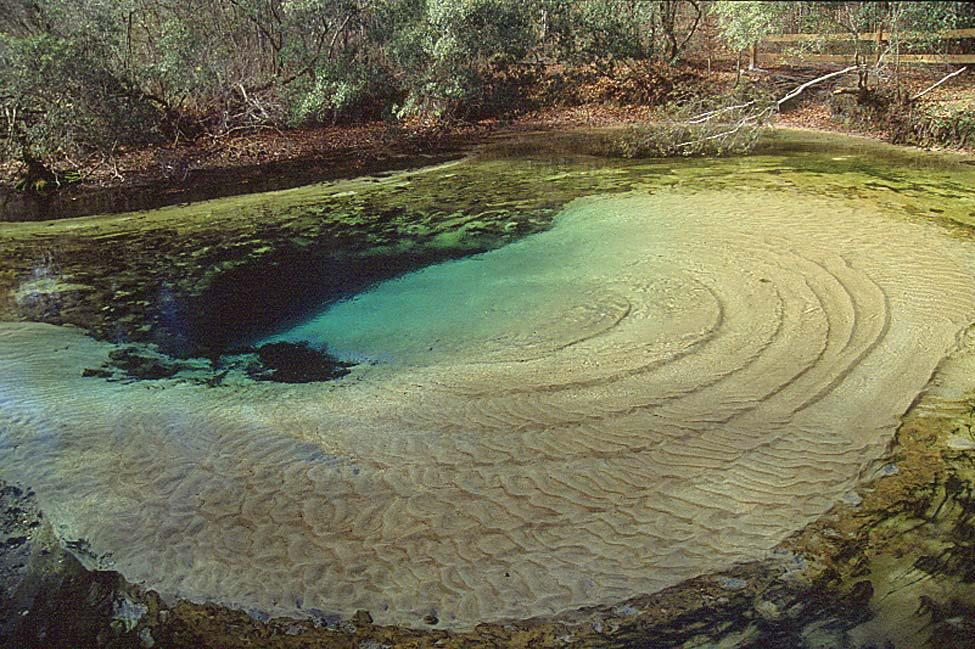
Williford Springs

Much of the river's flow comes from 11 named springs or spring groups consisting of more than 36 vents, including the first magnitude Gainer Springs Group and four second magnitude springs. The springs on Econfina Creek are concentrated in a 4.75 miles (7.64 km) long section where the river cuts through the Floridan Aquifer. More than 80% of the normal discharge of Econfina Creek into Deer Point Lake comes from the springs in this part of the river.

=== Public lands ===
The Northwest Florida Water Management District owns most of the land along the river, including 41,000 acres (170 km^{2}) in the Econfina Creek Water Management Area. The Water Management Area is also operated as the Econfina Creek Wildlife Management Area by the Florida Fish and Wildlife Conservation Commission.

=== Paddling trail ===
There is a 24-mile (39 km) long designated paddling trail from the Scott Road Bridge to the State Road 388 Bridge. This trail has the steepest fall of any designated canoe trail in Florida. It has been described as "the most exciting canoe trail in the state." The Florida Department of Environmental Protection recommends that only experienced paddlers use the upper portion of the trail, and advises that the river is too dangerous for paddling when the water is high following heavy rains.

== History ==
More than 120 archaeological sites have been identified in the Econfina Creek watershed, including many prehistoric sites. Paleo-Indian arrowheads, about 7,000 years old, have been found at some of the sites. When humans first entered Florida about 12,000 years ago, the water table was much lower, and the course of Econfina Creek was a series of waterholes, and not a flowing river. Choctaw and Creek people lived around Econfina Creek at various times prior the acquisition of Florida by the United States. In the 1830s these people were forced to leave Florida as part of the Trail of Tears.

White settlers started moving into the land along Econfina Creek shortly after the United States acquired Florida in 1821. One of the earliest settlers was William Gainer, who was with Andrew Jackson's forces when they passed through the area on their way to Pensacola in 1818 (during the First Seminole War). The bottom land along Econfina Creek was the only place in what is now Bay County that had plantations using slaves. The first cotton shipped from St. Joseph was reported to have come from Econfina. To facilitate this traffic, the Territorial Legislative Council declared Econfina Creek a navigable river up to the Gainer Bridge (built by William Gainer after the natural bridge collapsed).

== Deer Point Lake ==
Deer Point Lake was created when a dam was constructed across North Bay, part of St. Andrews Bay, in 1961. The reservoir covers 5,000 acres (20 km^{2}). It has a watershed (including Econfina Creek) of 422 square miles (1,090 km^{2}). The reservoir receives an average of 600,000,000 US gallons (2.3×10^{9} L) a day from four sources, and provides fresh water to Panama City and other parts of Bay County. About 60% of the water in the reservoir comes from Econfina Creek. During very dry conditions, Econfina Creek supplies up to 80% of the water flowing into the reservoir.
