= Lake Eva =

- Location within Florida Location within the United States
- Location: north side of the city of Lake Alfred, Florida
- Coordinates: 28.1133°N 81.7334°W
- Type: natural freshwater lake
- Basin countries: United States
- Max. length: 1,710 feet (520 m)
- Max. width: 780 feet (240 m)
- Surface area: 20.5 acres (8 ha)
- Average depth: 6 feet (1.8 m)
- Max. depth: 13 feet (4.0 m)
- Water volume: 60,626,198 US gallons (229,495,120 L)
- Surface elevation: 130 feet (40 m)

Lake Eva, located west of Polk County Road 557, is on the north side of the city of Lake Alfred, Florida. This lake is somewhat kidney-shaped and has a surface area of 20.5 acres (83,000 m^{2}). Lake Eva in inside the Lake Alfred city limits and is 380 feet (120 m) west of Polk County Road 557. Its east shore is bordered by some homes with large lots. The northeast, north and west shores are bordered by citrus groves. A swampy area is on the south shore and a grassy area is along the southeast shore.

Lake Eva is completely surrounded by private property. There is no public access to Lake Eva other than a canal on the lake's southwest that connects to nearby Lake Alfred. However, this canal is too shallow to be navigated by any boats and it is sometimes dry. There is no information about the types of fish in the lake, although it appears in an area map in the Take Me Fishing website.
