= Boulware Springs Water Works =

Historic site in Gainesville, Florida, United States

- Boulware Spring Waterworks
- U.S. National Register of Historic Places
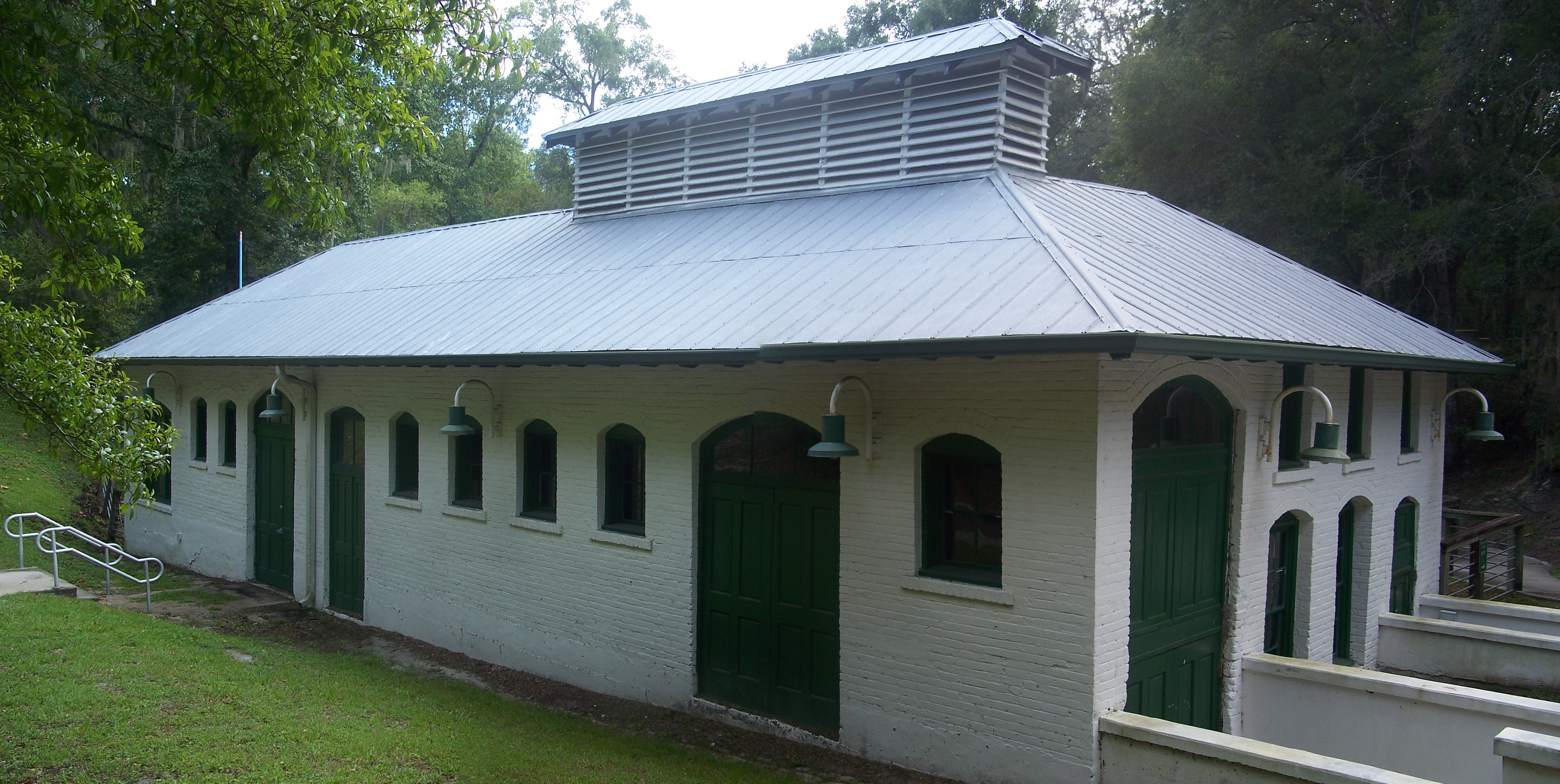

- Location within Florida Location within the United States
- Location: Gainesville, Florida
- Coordinates: 29°37′15″N 82°18′25″W
- NRHP reference No.: 85001255
- Added to NRHP: 20 June 1985

The Boulware Springs Water Works is a historic site in Gainesville, Florida, United States. It is located at 3400 Southeast 15th Street. On June 20, 1985, it was added to the U.S. National Register of Historic Places. It is also the western terminus of the Gainesville-Hawthorne State Trail.

The spring was the site of an 1854 meeting where area citizens voted to create a new town (Gainesville) to replace Newnansville as the Alachua County seat. The spring was the source of city water until 1913 and was important in the city's growth. The University of Florida moved from Lake City to Gainesville in 1901 because the city promised the university free water for life, from the Boulware Springs. The University of Florida still does not pay for water, even though the springs are no longer used in Gainesville's water system.
