= Alligator Lake, Columbia County, Florida =

Coordinates: 30°09′51″N 82°37′39″W

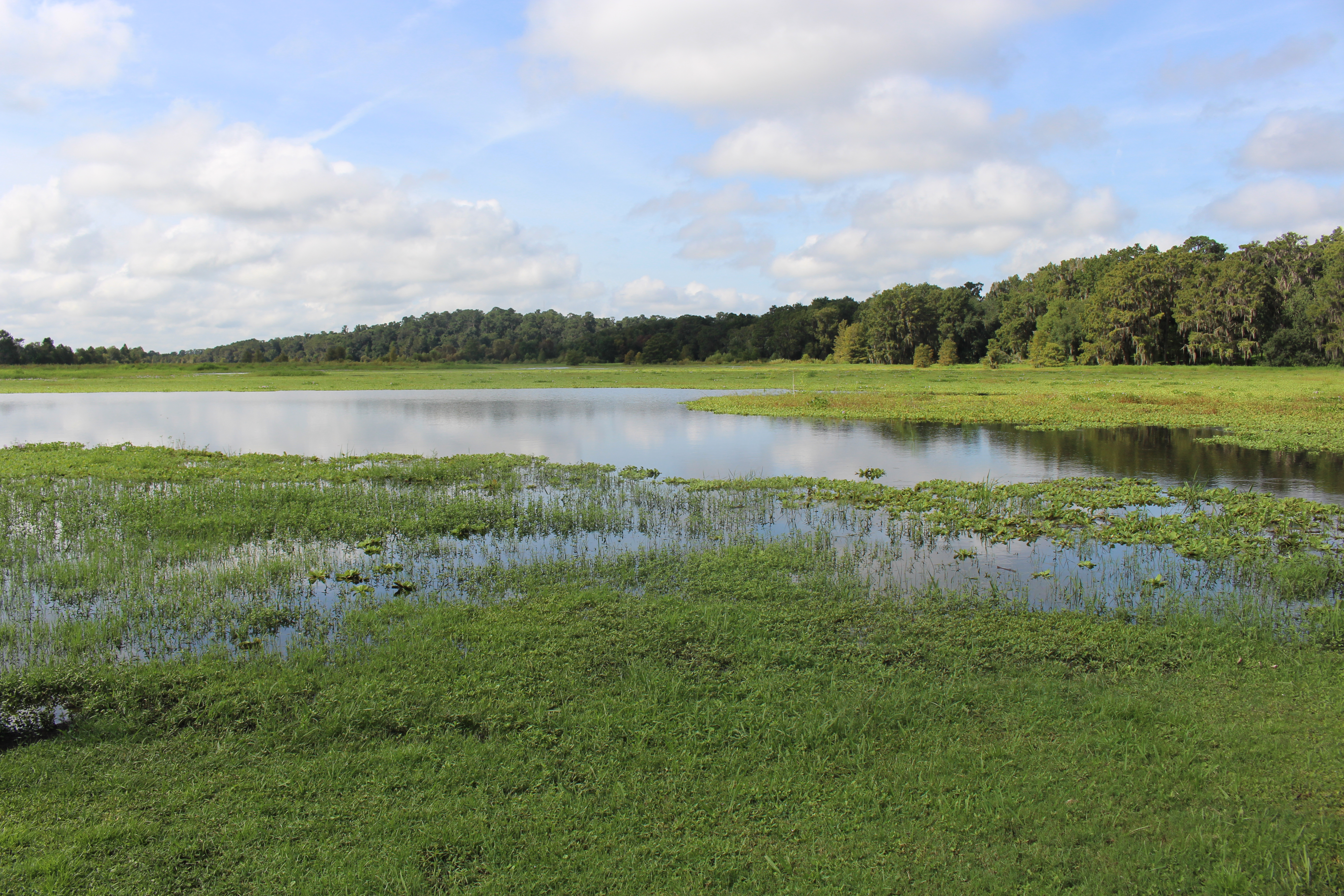

Alligator Lake is located in central Columbia County, Florida, United States.

== History ==
In 1835, it was reported that Alligator Lake, also known as Alligator Basin, was a prairie or savanna and was used by the local Native Americans as pasture land. The lake was reported as dry in the fall of 1891 and the fall of 1899, both years with below average rainfall. It was also dry in the winter and spring of 1909 and during the summer of 1909, the lake once again partially filled.
