= Apopka Spring =

Coordinates: 28°34′02″N 81°40′52″W

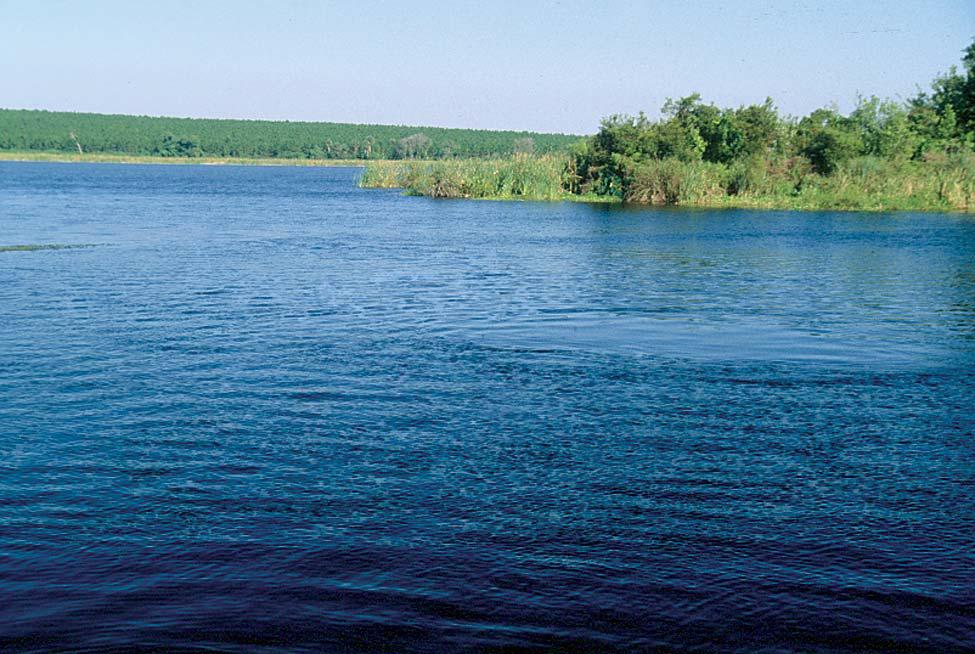
Apopka Spring Boil

Apopka Spring is a second magnitude spring in the Gourd Neck bay of Lake Apopka east of Clermont in Lake County, Florida. The immediate area surrounding the spring is undeveloped swampland surrounded by Clermont's mostly suburban development on most sides with Lake Apopka itself to the east into which it discharges into. There is a bottled water plant nearby that withdraws water from the aquifer system feeding into the spring.

The spring itself is only accessible by boat and the surrounding land is in private property. The vent originates 90 feet below the water surface and opens at 45 feet below the water surface. 2 divers died attempting to explore the vent. The spring pool is roughly 180 feet in diameter at the surface. During times of high water flow the pool is clear and at low flow it is murky from lake water.
