= St. Andrews Bay (Florida) =

69,000-acre estuary located in northwest Florida

Coordinates: 30°09′08″N 85°41′28″W

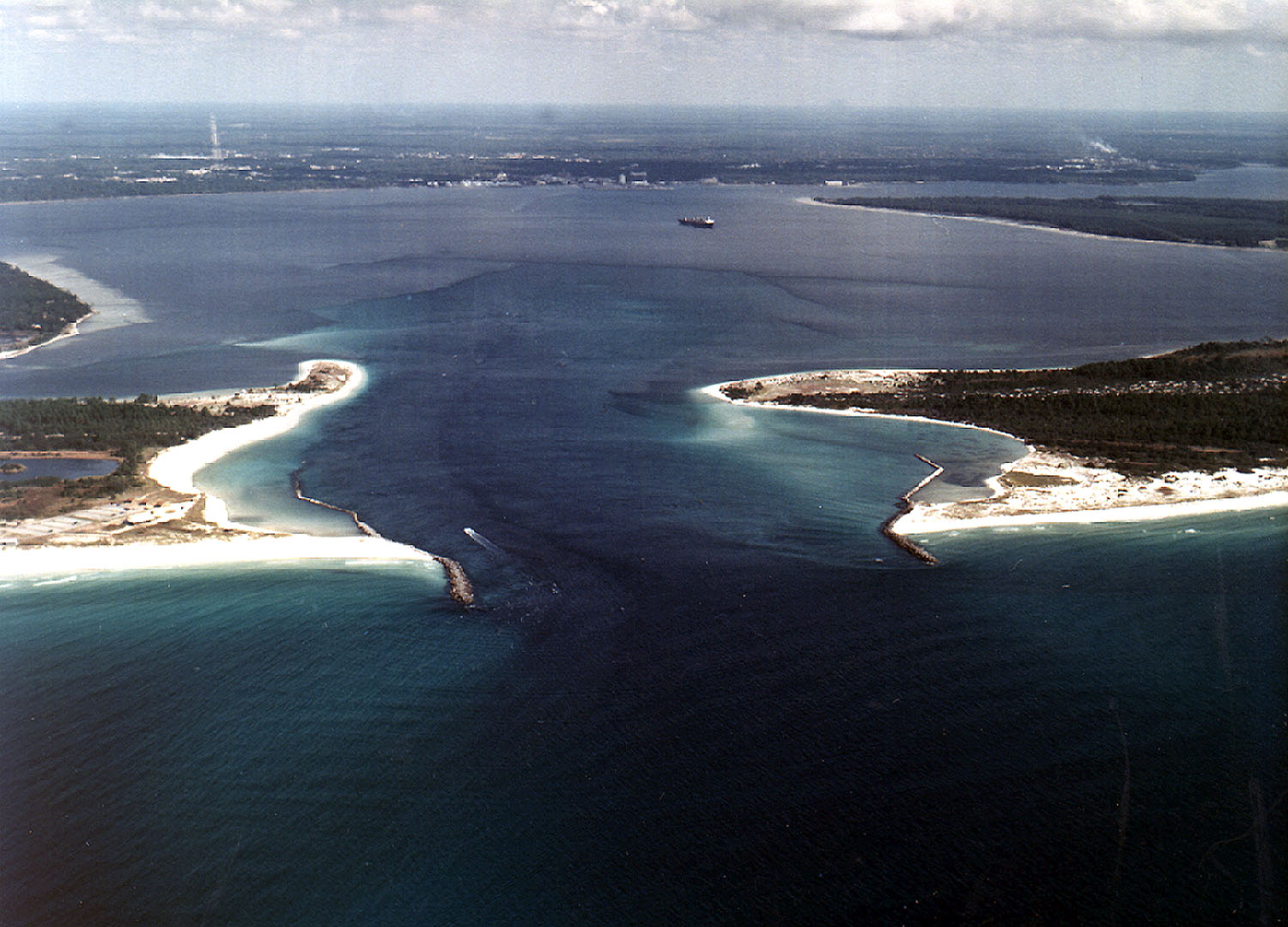
Aerial view of St. Andrews Bay and the harbor entrance from the Gulf of Mexico. View is to the east-northeast.

St. Andrew Bay, colloquially called "St. Andrews Bay", is a bay located in Bay County in the panhandle of Florida. It is a 69,000-acre estuary located in northwest Florida. It is relatively deep, and of relatively high salinity due to the low freshwater inflow provided by only a few spring-fed creeks (the most significant being Econfina Creek, fed by Wiliford and Pitts Springs). The bay is named for Saint Andrew. Panama City, the county seat of Bay County, is located on the bay. The Atlanta & St. Andrews Bay Railway, which ran from Panama City to Dothan, Alabama (and still exists as a smaller short line), was also named for the bay.

== History ==
St. Andrew Bay was the location of a large number of saltworks critical for the Confederacy during the American Civil War. Edward Crissey, in command of the steamboat USS Bloomer, which he had been instrumental in stealing from her berth near Geneva, Alabama, helped destroy numerous salt works, doing great damage to the Confederate war effort. The shallow draft of the steamboat allowed her to go up inlets where other, deeper draft vessels had been unable to travel.

== Wildlife ==
Wild dolphin are commonly seen in the waters of St. Andrew Bay; they are easily spotted when the waters are smooth in the mornings. In shallower waters, St. Andrew Bay is known for vast schools of mullet, redfish and speckled trout. Occasionally a manatee is spotted in the bay as well.
