= Homosassa River =

River in Florida, United States

Coordinates: 28°46′15.6″N 82°41′39.4″W

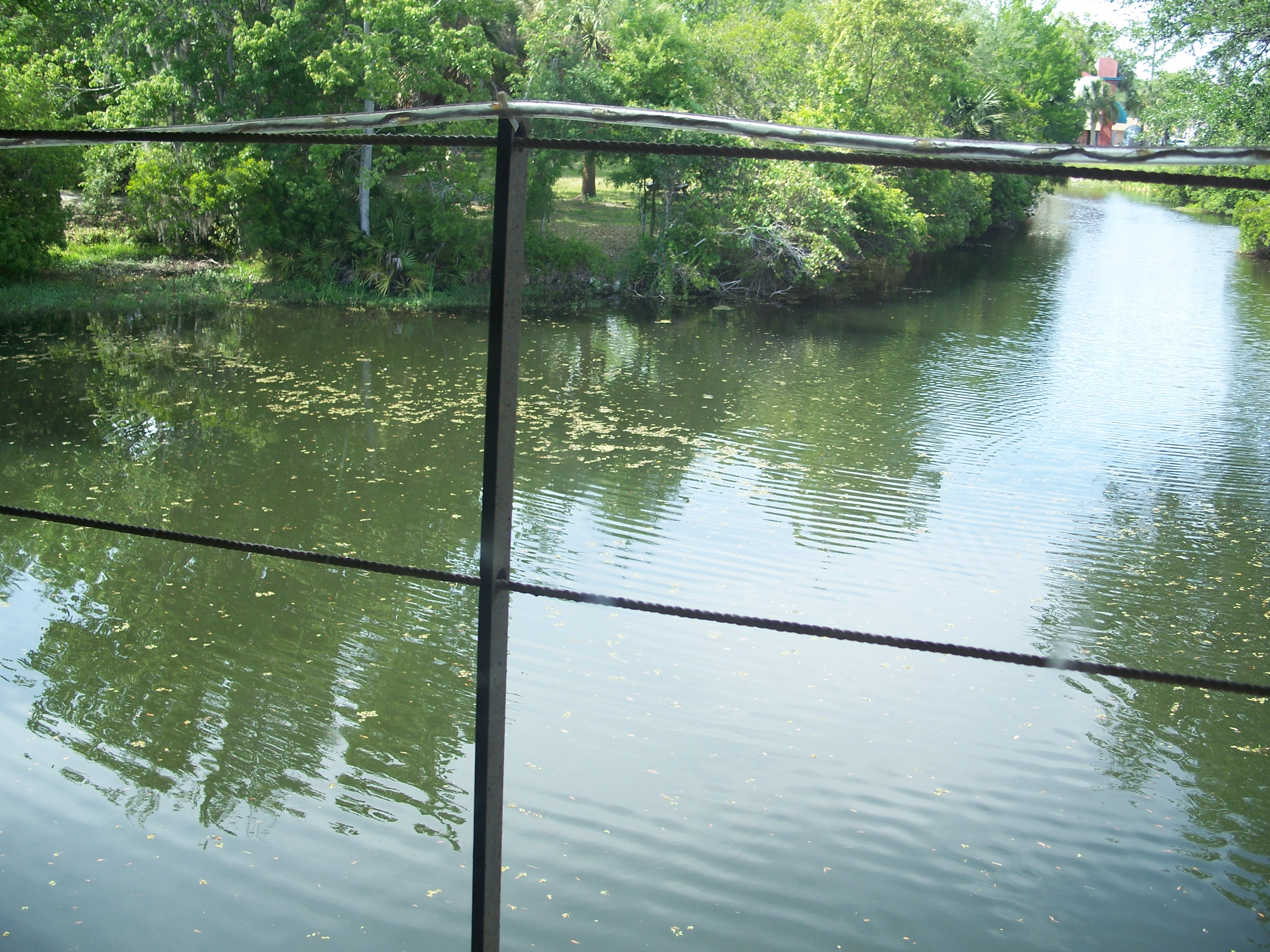
- The Homosassa River from nearby Homosassa Springs Wildlife State Park.

Location
- Country: United States
- State: Florida

Physical characteristics
- Source
  - location: Homosassa Springs
  - elevation: 0 ft (0 m)
- Mouth
  - location: Gulf of Mexico
  - elevation: 0 ft (0 m)
- Length: 7.7 mi (12.4 km)

Homosassa River is a 7.7-mile-long (12.4 km) river in Citrus County, Florida, in the western part of the state. Its headwaters are the Homosassa Springs, and from there it flows west into the Gulf of Mexico. The river is home to common bottlenose dolphins, West Indian manatees, alligator snapping turtles, nine-banded armadillos, snakes, birds, eastern box turtles, oysters, raccoons, American alligators, Virginia opossums, North American river otters and many species of both freshwater and saltwater fish. The Homosassa River is an estuary, which means that as it moves inland, it changes from salt water to fresh very gradually, and the river is brackish. The river is good for canoeing and kayaking.

== Monkey Island ==
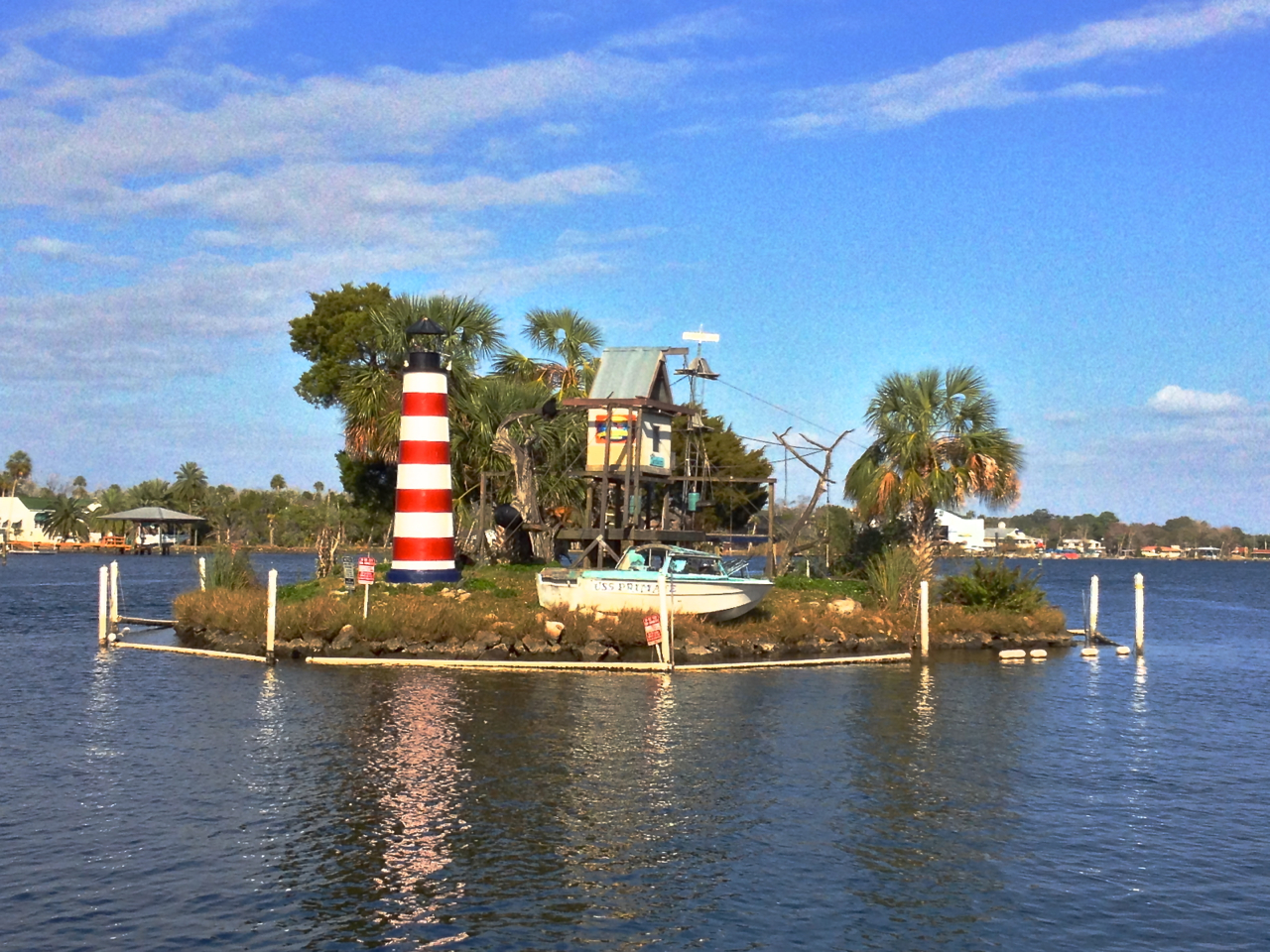
Monkey Island

Monkey Island is a small island in the Homosassa River next to the Florida Cracker Riverside Resort and downtown "Old" Homosassa, Florida. The island was originally created when G. A. Furgason, a developer of the Homosassa area, hired a dragline operator to create the island from a pile of rocks submerged during high tide in order to keep boats from running aground. The island derives its name from the monkeys relocated to the island from the Homosassa Springs Wildlife Park in the 1960s. The monkeys were moved from the park due to their "problematic" behavior, including stealing candy, entering cars, and biting visitors. The river acts as a natural fence because the monkeys prefer not to swim. Currently three spider monkeys inhabit the island, two of which are from the original relocation. The island contains a lighthouse, Cedar trees, and a monkey "playground". They are fed fresh fruit daily by staff members.
