= Lake Butler (Polk County, Florida) =

- Location within Florida Location within the United States
- Location: south side of Haines City, Florida
- Coordinates: 28.0859°N 81.6331°W
- Type: natural freshwater lake
- Basin countries: United States
- Max. length: 1,180 feet (360 m)
- Max. width: 940 feet (290 m)
- Surface area: 17.26 acres (7 ha)
- Surface elevation: 121 feet (37 m)

Lake Butler, which is very swampy along most of its shoreline, has a surface area of 17.26-acre (69,800 m^{2}). On the northeast and east shores is a residential area. On the west is a citrus grove and on the south is grassy land with a scattering of residences.

Lake Butler has no public access on its shores. A canal connects it to Lake Eva, but the canal cannot be navigated, as it is full of swamp vegetation. There is no information about the types of fish in Lake Butler.
