= Crystal River (Florida) =

River in Florida, USA

Coordinates: 28°55′36″N 82°41′41″W

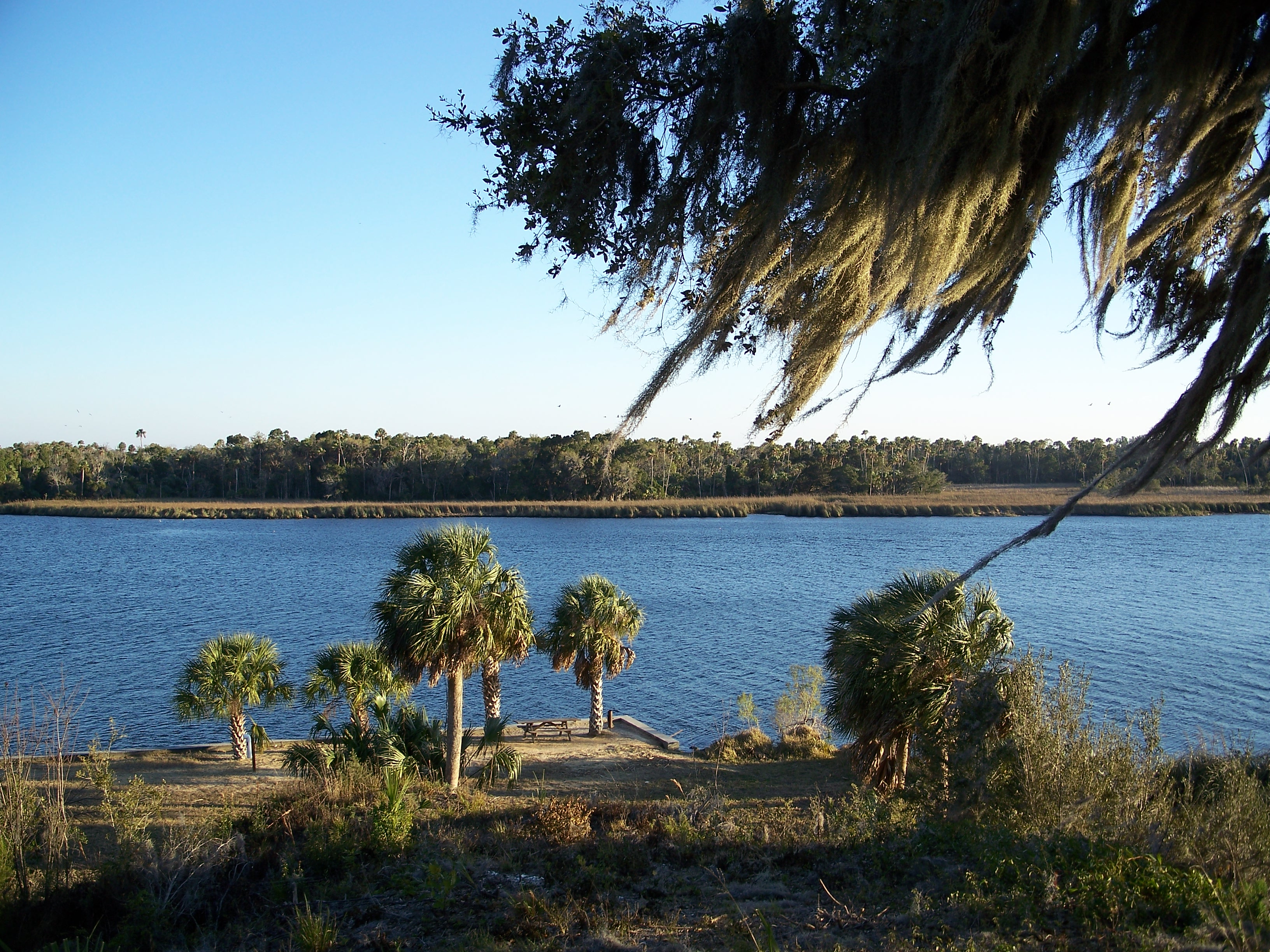
View of Crystal River from the top of the temple mound in Crystal River Archaeological State Park

Crystal River is a river in Citrus County, Florida, flowing into the Gulf of Mexico. It is just seven miles (eleven kilometers) long, and has a drainage basin of five square miles (thirteen square kilometers), joining Kings Bay to the Gulf of Mexico. The river's significance is in the thirty natural springs that add an average of 300 million gallons (1,135 million liters) of warm water to the river every day. These springs include Three Sisters Springs.

The warm water in the river attracts large numbers of manatees, and Kings Bay, at the head of the river and the location of 28 of the springs, harbors approximately 350 manatees during the winter. Some biologists consider Crystal River to be the most important refuge for manatees in the United States.

In the first half of the 19th century Crystal River was known as Weewahiiaca (wee-wah-heye-ih-YAH-kah), believed to be from the Creek language words wewa, meaning "water", and haiyayaka, meaning "clear". The city of Crystal River is located on the river. The Crystal River Energy Complex, which consists of four coal-burning power plants and the Crystal River Nuclear Plant, is located near the mouth of the river. The Crystal River Archaeological State Park is located on the river.

== Kings Bay ==
Kings Bay is Crystal River's headwater, or point of origin, and is fed by a number of springs that produce a constant temperature of 72 °F all year round. The 72° water attracts hundreds upon hundreds of manatees during the winter months looking to escape the cold water of the Gulf of Mexico. The springs in Kings Bay provide a habitat for 15 to 20 percent of the overall US manatee population.

== Problems in Crystal River ==
Recent studies have shown the nitrate level of Crystal River and Kings Bay has been on the rise. Historical water quality data from the early 1900s show that nitrate concentrations were 20 times lower than they are now. The main source of the nitrogen and phosphorus is ground water discharge from area springs and the overuse of inorganic fertilizers.

Lyngbya, a cyanobacteria, has been a problem in Kings Bay and Crystal River. It can be toxic to manatees, can cause many health issues in humans, and harmful to Crystal Rivers tourism. So far over 1,000 tons of Lyngbya have been removed with mechanical harvesters and raking. Removing Lyngbya mats does not help the regrowth of native grasses, and if you replant the native grasses it will most likely not succeed due to grazing of manatees.

Introduced exotic aquatic plants have been an issue for Crystal River/Kings Bay since the 1960s. Hydrilla and Eurasian watermilfoil have been the main concern. The plants make it difficult for boaters to navigate by getting stuck in the propeller.

== Kings Bay Phyto-Remediation Demonstration Project ==
A project has been underway in Kings Bay (Crystal River) since 2012 to use water hyacinth and water lettuce to improve the water quality and reduce algae growth. Even though water hyacinth is an exotic plant and has been a problem in the past, they have re-introduced them in PVC corrals where the hyacinth would filter out the toxins and kill off phytoplankton algae that are making the water green. The PVC corrals are necessary because manatees love to graze on this aquatic plant. The Kings Bay Adaptive Management Group (KBAM) heads this project.
