= Ellie Schiller Homosassa Springs Wildlife State Park =

State park in Florida, United States

Homosassa Springs Wildlife State Park
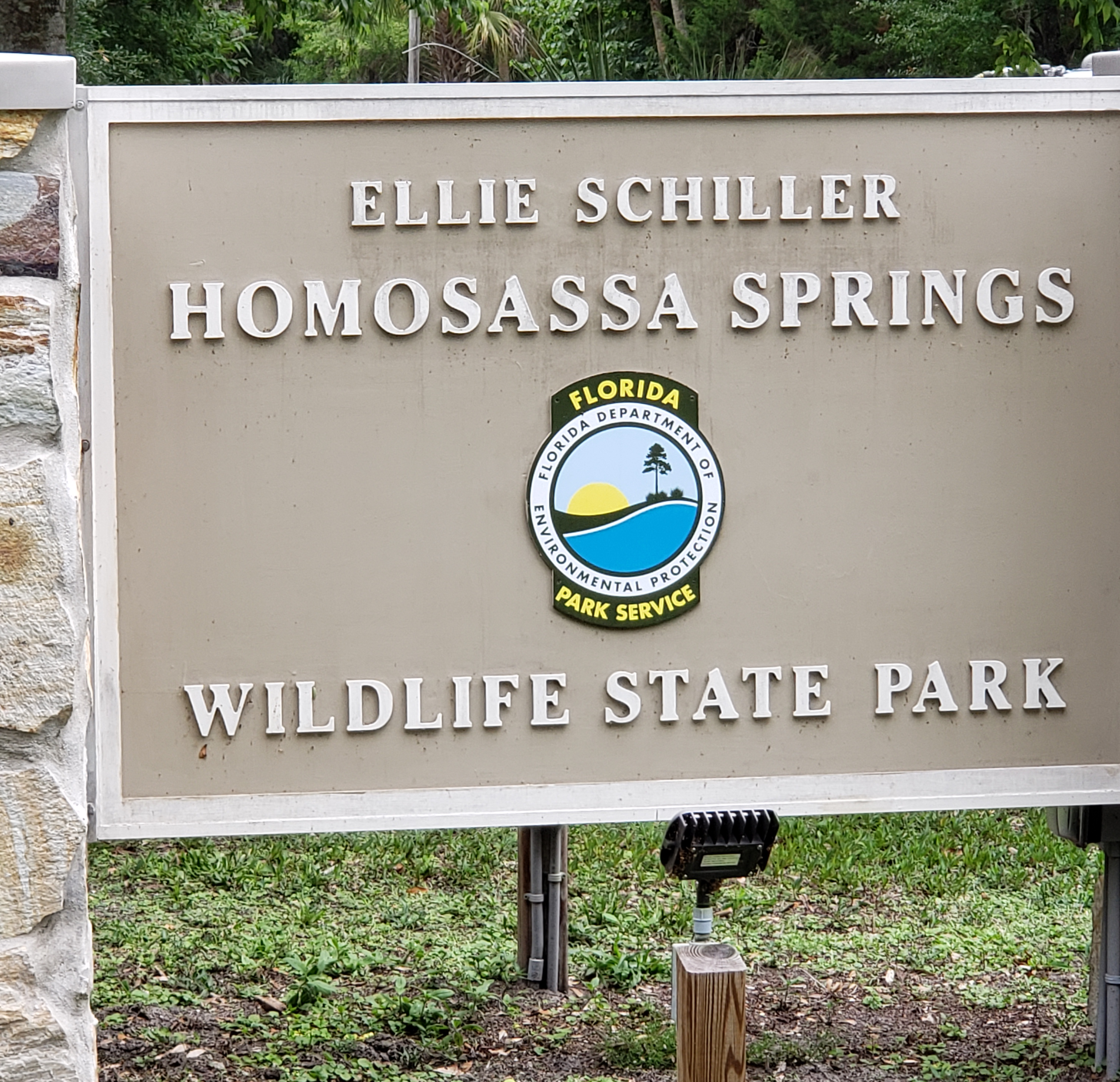
- Main entrance sign

- Location within Florida Location within the United States
- Interactive map of Homosassa Springs Wildlife State Park
- Location: Citrus County, Florida, United States
- Nearest city: Homosassa Springs, Florida
- Coordinates: 28°48′00″N 82°35′17″W
- Governing body: Florida Department of Environmental Protection

Homosassa Springs Wildlife State Park (also known as Ellie Schiller Homosassa Springs Wildlife State Park) is located near Homosassa Springs, Florida, in the United States. The park is one of the notable locations in the state to view manatees. Visitors can get close to the animals on a floating observatory. Black bears, bobcats, white-tailed deer, American alligators, and river otters have also been seen in the park.

The park was also formerly home to the hippopotamus Lu, famously known for his performances in many movies for the past 40 years, and later the oldest known hippo on record. The park is officially named Ellie Schiller Homosassa Springs Wildlife State Park in honor of Elmyra Felburn Schiller (1943 – 2009), a benefactor of the Florida state park system.

== History ==
Native Americans lived in the area of Homosassa Springs, Florida, long before the first non indigenous people entered the area. Within 200 years of encounter, the original inhabitants of the area were decimated by disease and colonial warfare. Soon after that, the area was resettled by several groups of Native Americans displaced from other areas, including the Seminoles and Miccosukee.

The springs are a historical attraction with documented accounts of tourism since the early 1900s. At that time, a railroad running along what is now Fishbowl Drive would let passengers off to walk a short trail to the spring. In the 1920s, the attraction was expanded to several structures that no longer exist, and a public swimming area was located at the spring.

The 1940s led to more expansion, along with the construction of the first underwater observatory, which consisted of an iron tank with small windows on each side. The original 50-acre (20 ha) property was purchased in 1964 by the Norris Development Company, with an additional 100-acre (40 ha) surrounding property, and entertainment facilities and animal exhibits were added.

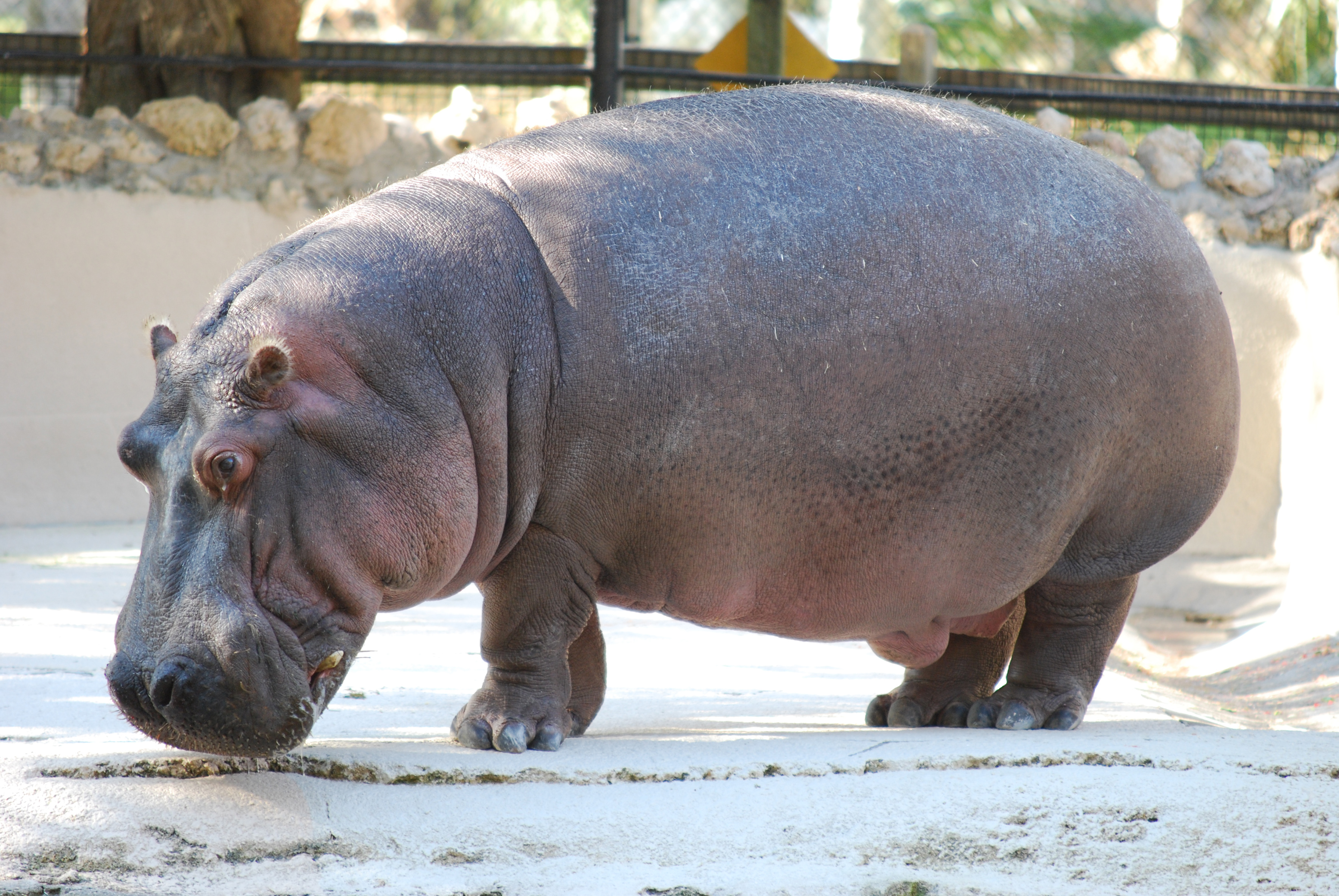
Lu the Hippopotamus is regarded as having been the oldest hippo on record.

Many of the animals kept here were trained for TV and film from Ivan Tors Animal Actors, including Buck, a bear that was a stand-in on the 1960s television show Gentle Ben, and Lu, the oldest hippopotamus in North America. Lu was the only animal in the park not native to Florida, he was born at the San Diego Zoo on January 26, 1960, and appeared in the TV shows Daktari and Cowboy in Africa. He had lived in the park since February 1966, and was declared an honorary citizen of Florida by Governor Lawton Chiles in the 1990s. Lu died at the park on June 8, 2025 aged 65 years as the oldest known hippo on record.

From 1978 until 1984, the land had several owners, until the Citrus County Commission purchased it as an environmentally sensitive area until the state of Florida could purchase the property as a Florida State Park.

== Gallery ==
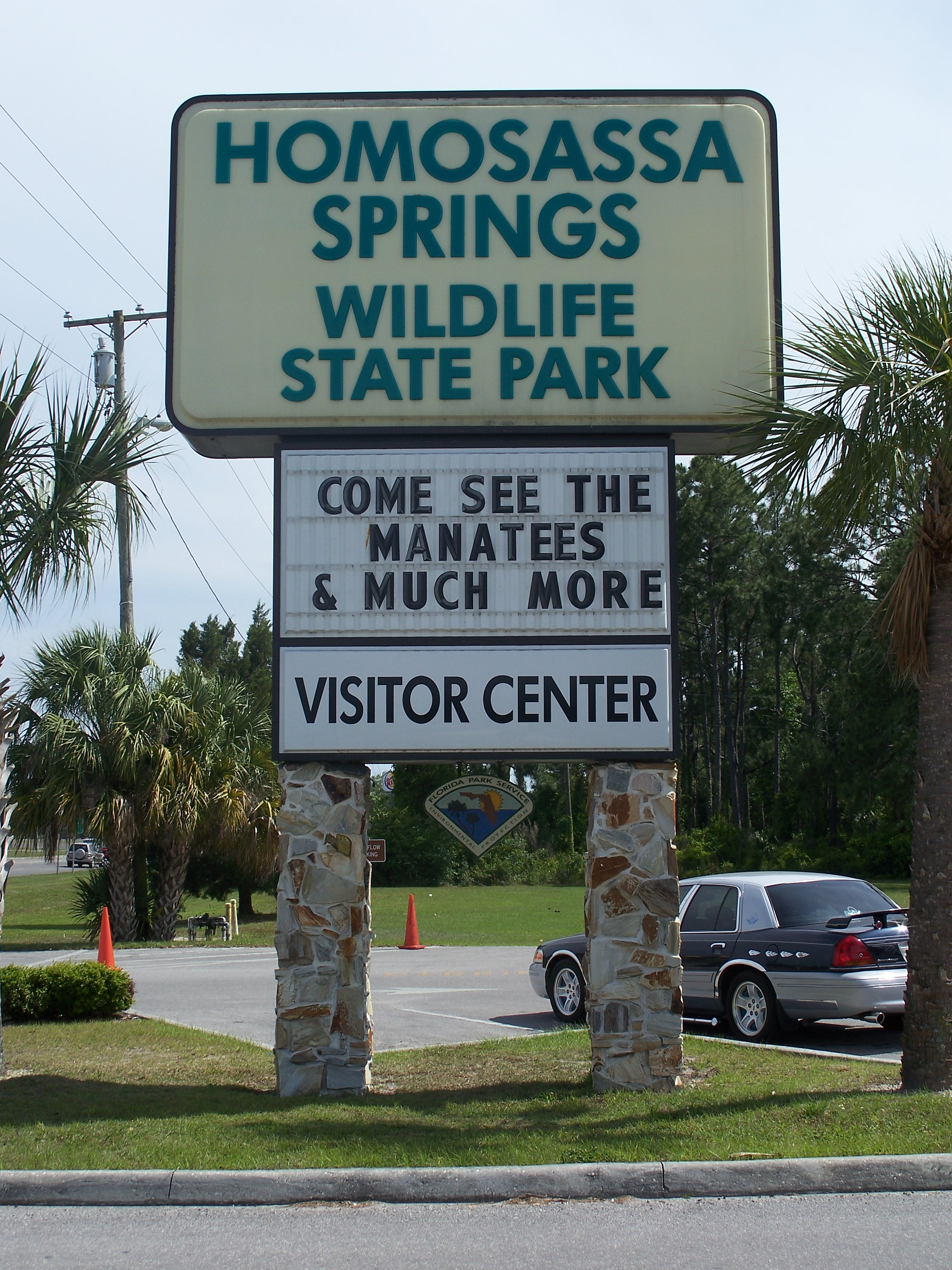
Sign by visitor center.

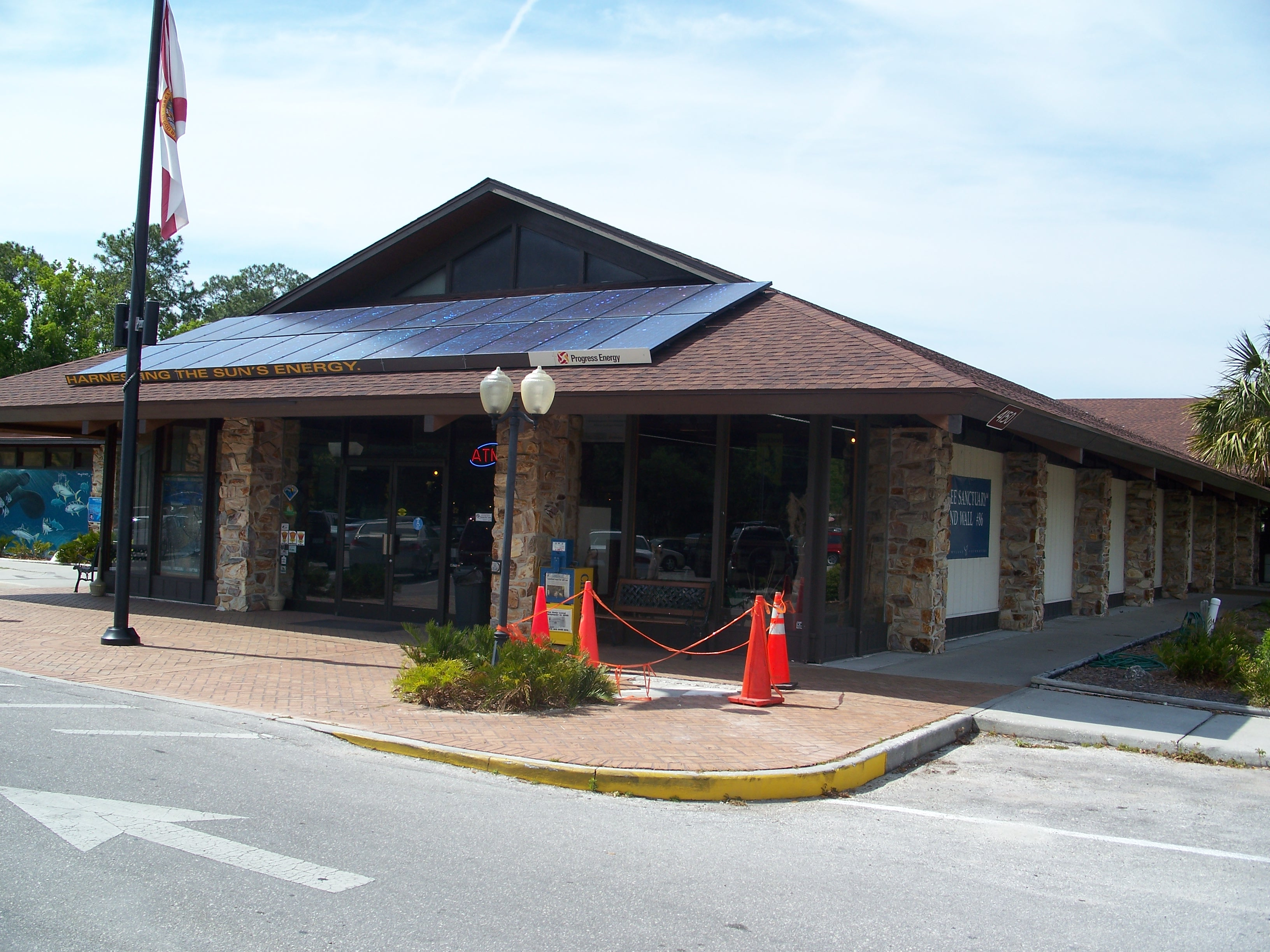
Visitor Center.

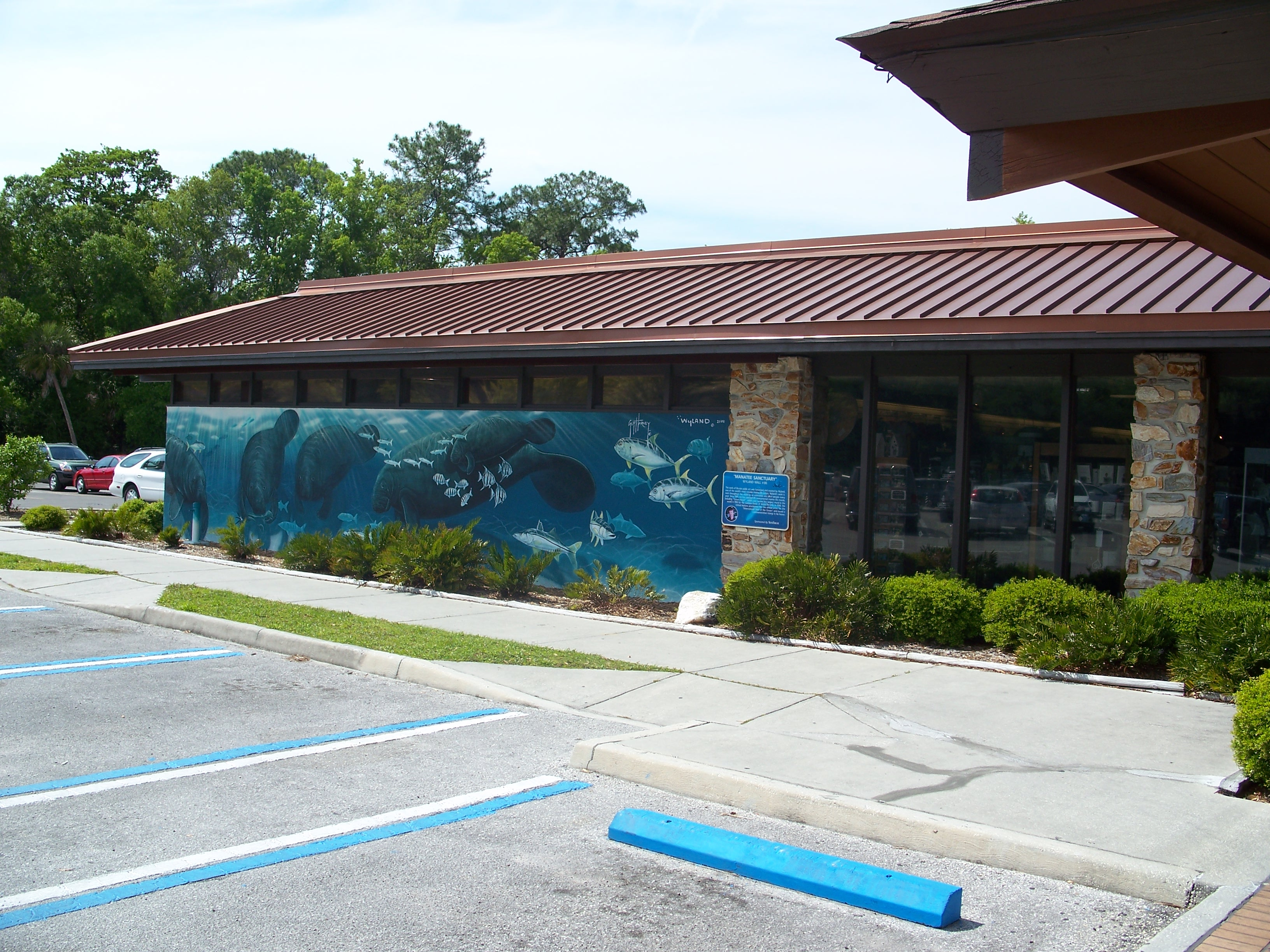
Manatee Sanctuary, a mural by Wyland.

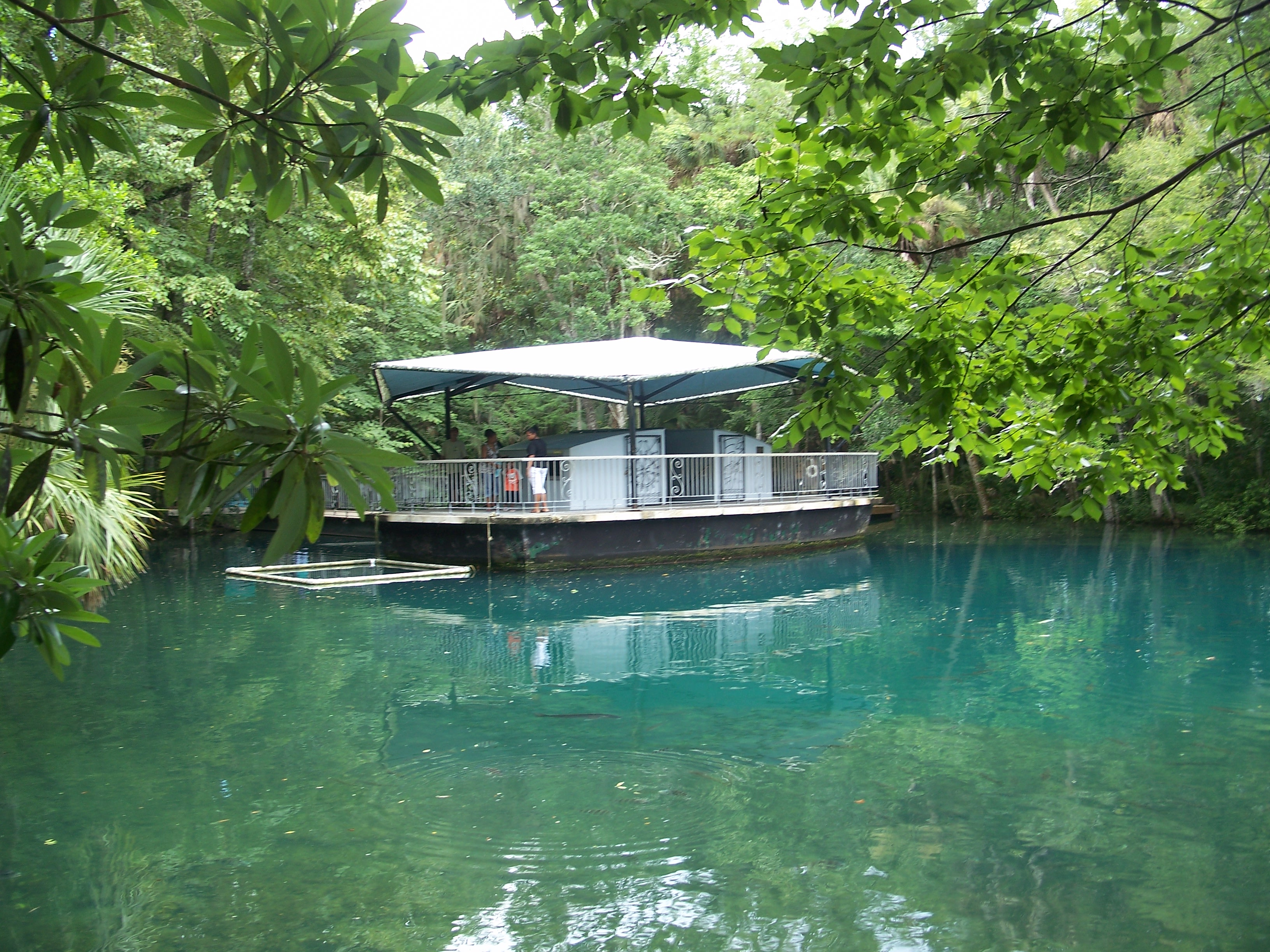
Observation deck.

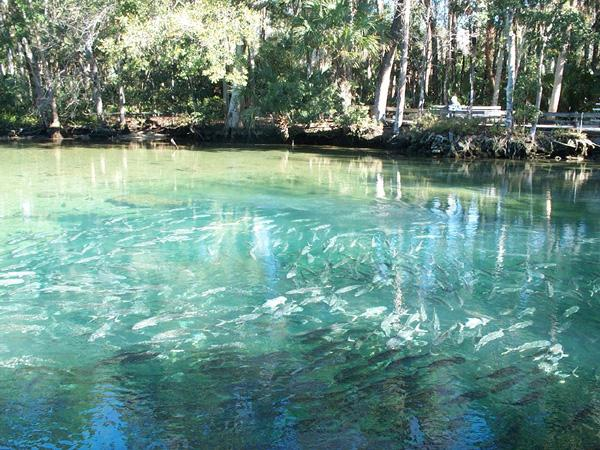
View of a school of fish in a spring.

== See also ==
- History of Florida
- Three Sisters Springs (Florida)
