= List of rivers of Florida =

This is a list of streams and rivers in the U.S. state of Florida. With one exception, the streams and rivers of Florida all originate on the Coastal plain. That exception is the Apalachicola River, which is formed by the merger of the Chattahoochee River, which originates in the Appalachian Mountains, and the Flint River, which originates in the Piedmont. Most streams and rivers in Florida start from swamps, while some originate from springs or lakes. Many of the streams and rivers are underground for part of their courses. The Everglades, sometimes called the "river of grass", is a very wide and shallow river that originates from Lake Okeechobee. Most of Florida's streams and rivers drain into the Gulf of Mexico. Drainage on the east coast of Florida is dominated by the St. Johns River, which, with the swamps that form its headwaters, extends parallel to the coast from inland of Fort Pierce to Jacksonville.

== By drainage basin ==
=== Atlantic coast ===
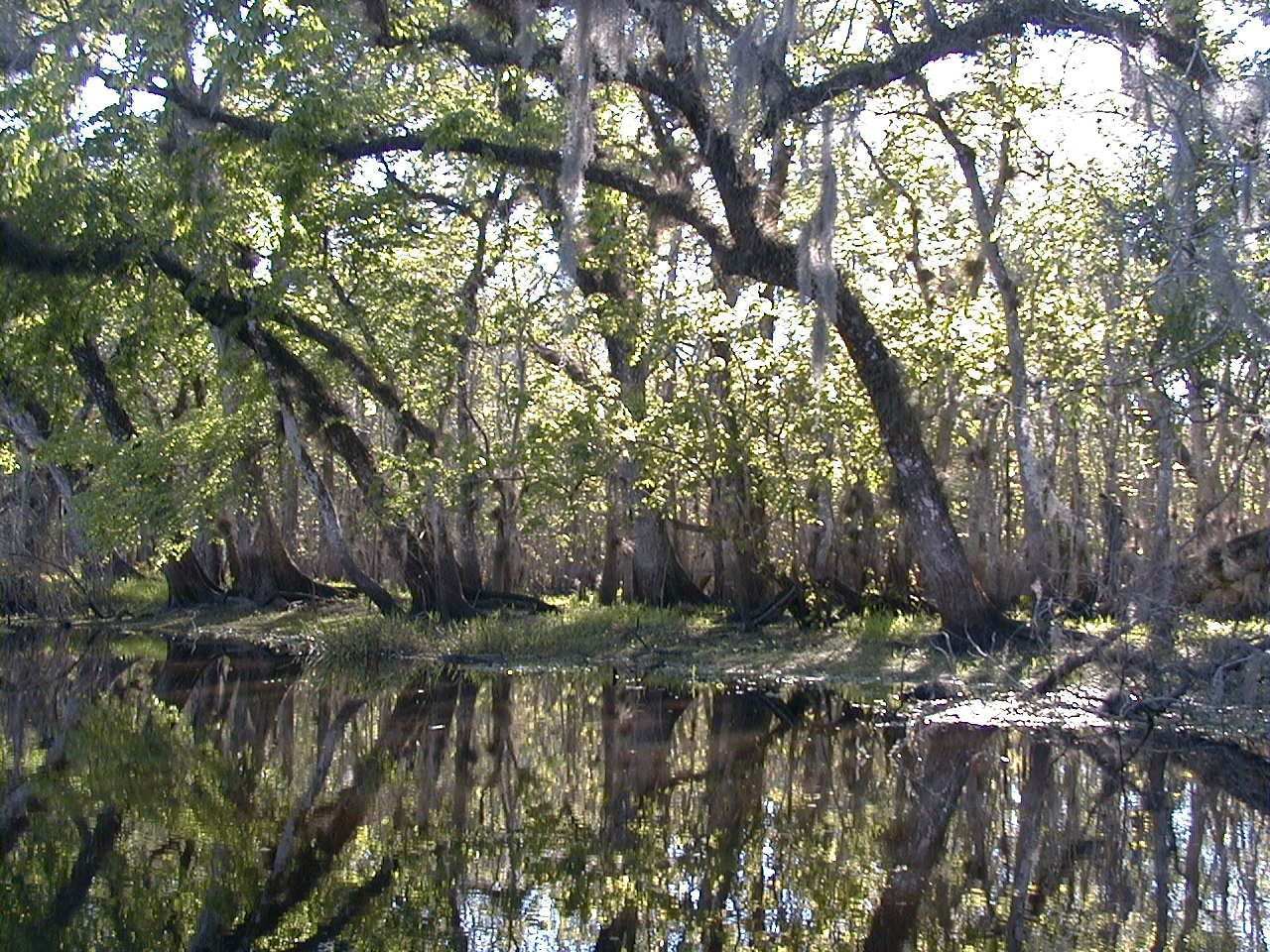
St. Johns River in Blue Spring State Park.

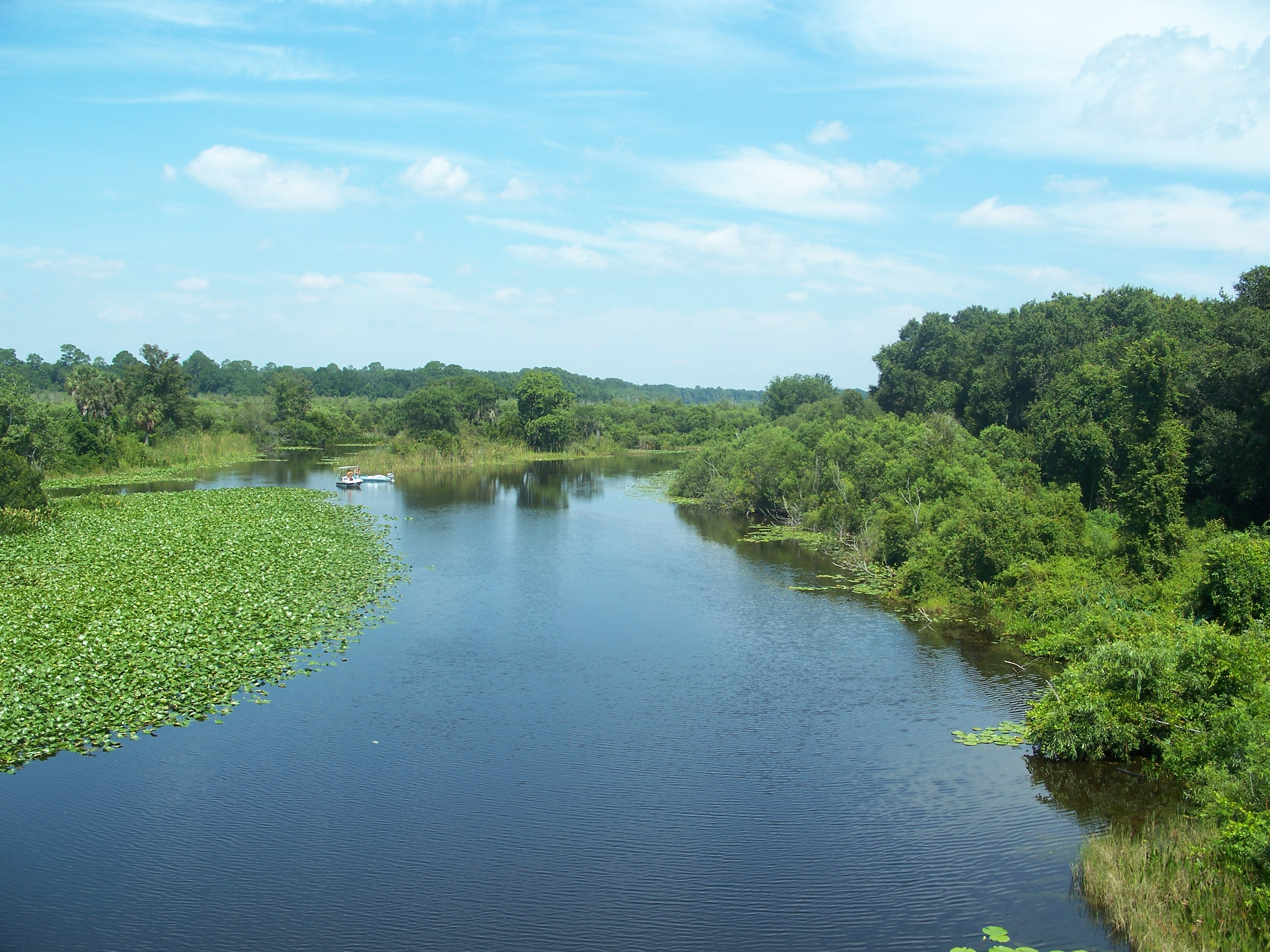
Ocklawaha River

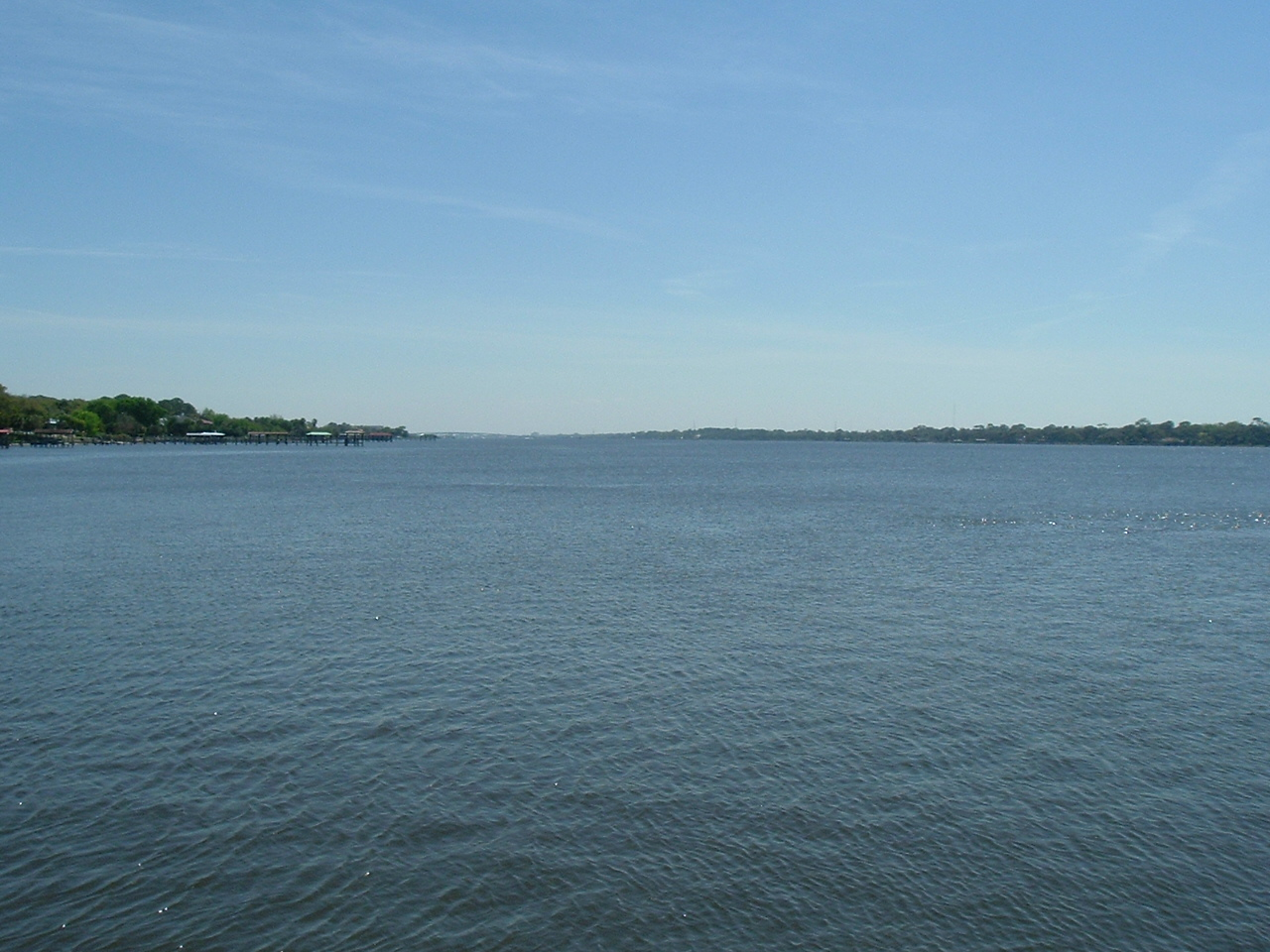
Halifax River

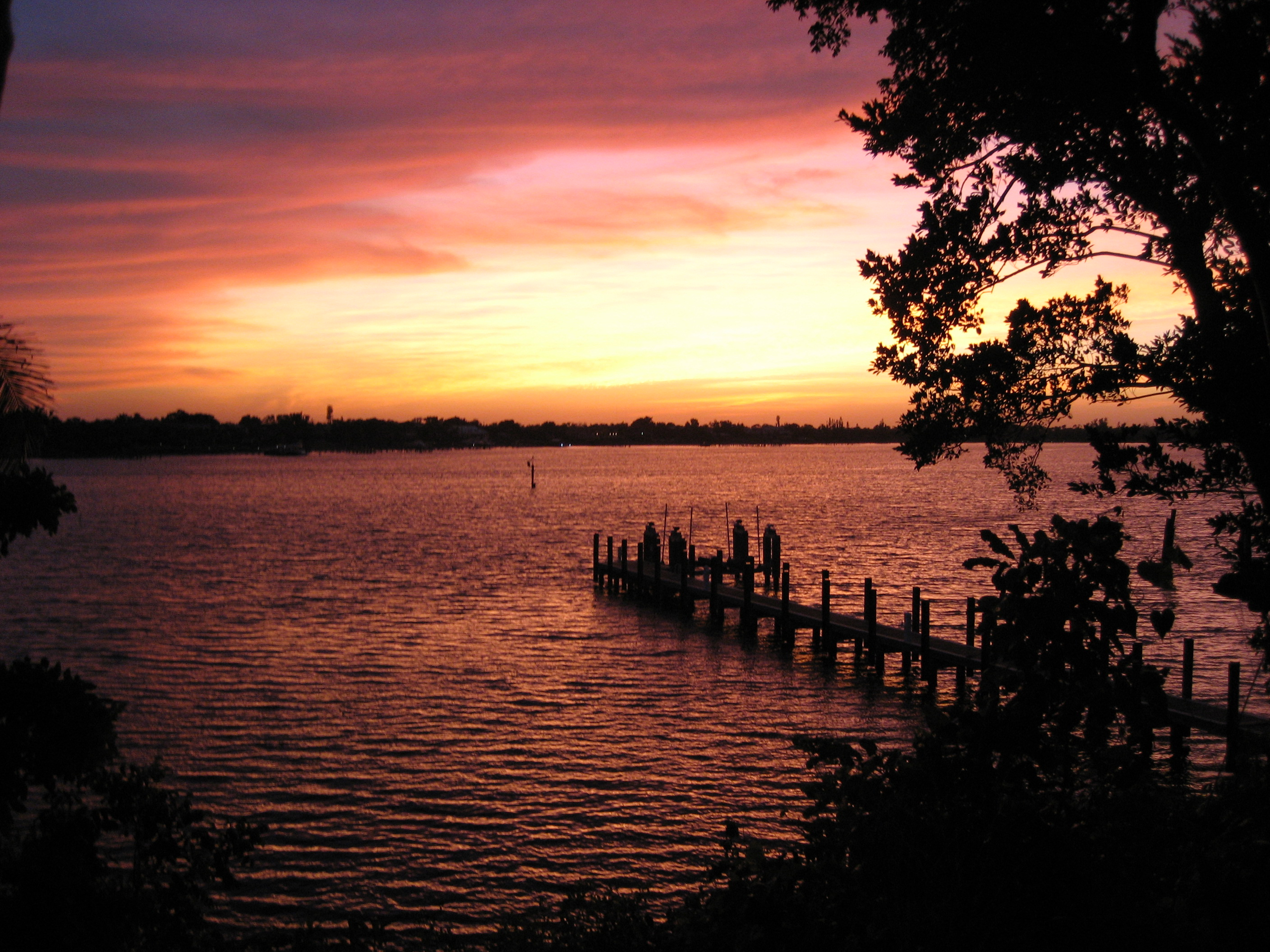
St. Lucie River

Rivers are listed as they enter the ocean from north to south. Tributaries are listed as they enter their main stem from downstream to upstream.

- St. Marys River
  - Amelia River
    - Bells River
- Nassau River
  - South Amelia River
  - Thomas Creek
- Fort George River
- St. Johns River – Juniper Springs, Salt Springs, Silver Glen Springs, Alexander Springs, Blue Spring, Beecher Spring
  - Pablo Creek
  - Sisters Creek
  - Broward River
  - Trout River
    - Ribault River
    - Little Trout River
  - Arlington River
    - Pottsburg Creek
  - Ortega River
    - Cedar River
  - Doctors Lake
  - Julington Creek
  - Black Creek
    - North Fork Black Creek
      - Lake Kingsley
      - Yellow Water Creek
    - South Fork Black Creek
  - Rice Creek
    - Etonia Creek
  - Dunns Creek
  - Ocklawaha River
    - Orange Creek
      - Little Orange Creek
      - Orange Lake
        - Cross Creek
          - Lochloosa Lake
            - Lochloosa Creek
        - Prairie Creek-Camp Canal-River Styx
          - Newnans Lake
    - Silver River
    - Lake Griffin
    - Yale Canal
      - Lake Yale
      - Haines Creek
        - Lake Eustis
          - Dora Canal
            - Lake Dora
              - Lake Beauclair
                - Apopka-Beauclair Canal
                  - Lake Apopka
          - Dead River
            - Lake Harris
              - Palatlakaha River
  - Salt Springs River
  - Alexander Springs Creek
  - Hontoon Dead River
  - Wekiva River – Wekiwa Springs
    - Blackwater Creek
    - Little Wekiva River
  - Lake Jesup
  - Econlockhatchee River
    - Little Econlockhatchee River
- Matanzas River
  - Moses Creek
  - Tolomato River
    - Guana River
  - San Sebastian River
- Halifax River
  - Spruce Creek
  - Tomoka River
  - Bulow Creek
- Indian River North
- Indian River
  - Banana River
  - Eau Gallie River
    - Elbow Creek
  - Crane Creek
  - Turkey Creek
  - Saint Sebastian River
- St. Lucie River
- Loxahatchee River
- Hillsboro River
- Stranahan River
  - New River (Broward County)
  - Middle River
- Oleta River
- Little River
- Miami River
  - Wagner Creek
- Snapper Creek

=== Alachua Sink ===
Water enters Paynes Prairie Basin from a number of sources. Historically it drained only into Alachua Sink. Water entering the Alachua Sink flows into the Floridan aquifer. (Various sources stating that water entering the Alachua Sink flows to the Santa Fe River may be based on a story told by a Seminole guide to a white explorer in 1823, that a Seminole who had drowned in the sink was later found in the river.) In 1927, Camps Canal was built, which linked the basin to the Orange Lake through the River Styx and ultimately to the Atlantic Ocean.

- Bivens Arm
  - Tumbling Creek
  - Little Tumbling Creek
- Hogtown Creek
- Sweetwater Branch
- Prairie Creek
  - Newnans Lake
    - Hatchet Creek
    - Lake Forest Creek
    - Little Hatchet Creek
- Chacala Run
  - Chacala Pond
    - Sawgrass Run
      - Sawgrass Pond
        - Lake Wauburg
          - Georges Pond
            - Burnt Pond
- Dog Branch

=== Lake Okeechobee ===
Lake Okeechobee drains into the Atlantic Ocean via the St. Lucie River, the West Palm Beach Canal, the Hillsboro Canal, the North New River Canal, and the Miami Canal, and into the Gulf of Mexico via the Caloosahatchee Canal which connects to the head of the Caloosahatchee River. The major input of water into Lake Okeechobee comes from the north, via the Kissimmee River. Rivers are listed as they enter Lake Okeechobee from west to east. Tributaries are listed as they enter their main stem from downstream to upstream.

- Fisheating Creek
- Indian Prairie Canal
  - Lake Istokpoga
- Kissimmee River
  - Istokpoga Creek
    - Lake Istokpoga
      - Arbuckle Creek
      - Josephine Creek
  - Jackson Canal
  - Zipprer Canal
    - Lake Rosalie
      - Weohykapha Creek
  - Jackson Canal
  - Lake Kissimmee
    - C-37 canal
      - Lake Hatchineha
        - Catfish Creek
        - Lake Marion Creek
          - Snell Creek
        - Reedy Creek
        - C-36 canal
          - Cypress Lake (Florida)
            - Dead River
            - C-34 canal
            - C-35 canal
              - Lake Tohopekaliga
                - Shingle Creek
                  - C-31 canal
                    - East Lake Tohopekaliga
                      - Boggy Creek
- Taylor Creek
- Mosquito Creek
- Henry Creek
- Lettuce Creek

=== Gulf coast ===
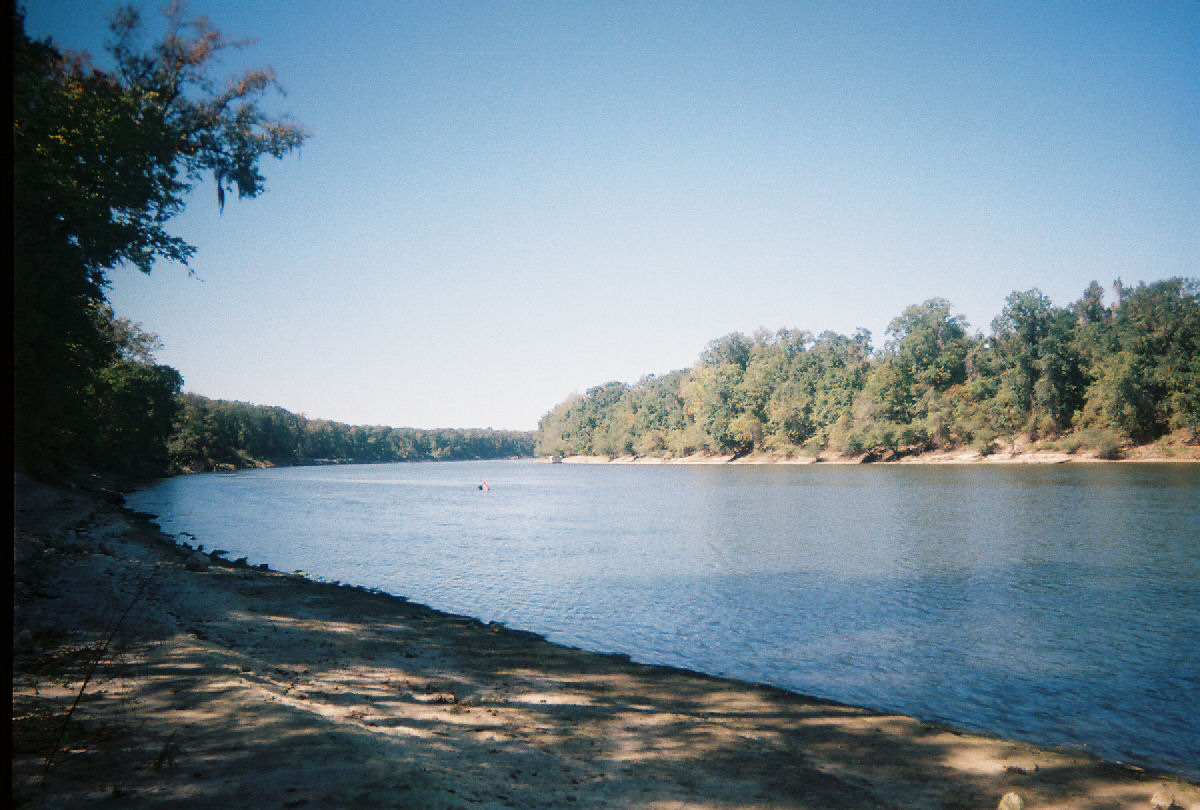
Apalachicola River in Torreya State Park

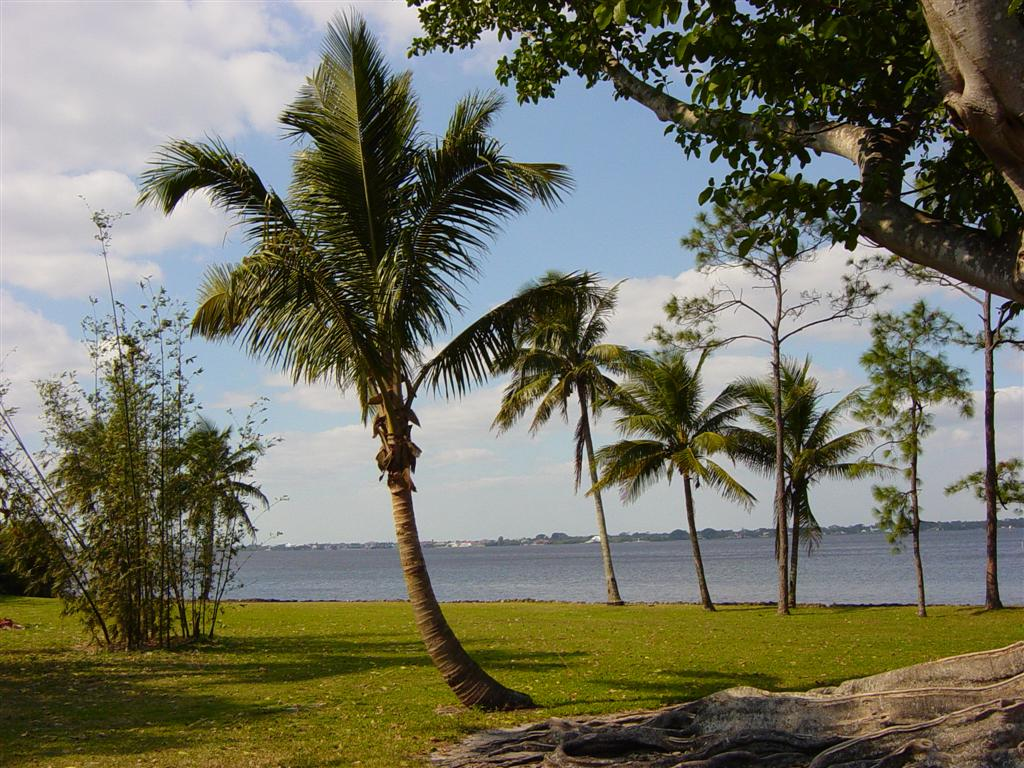
Caloosahatchee River

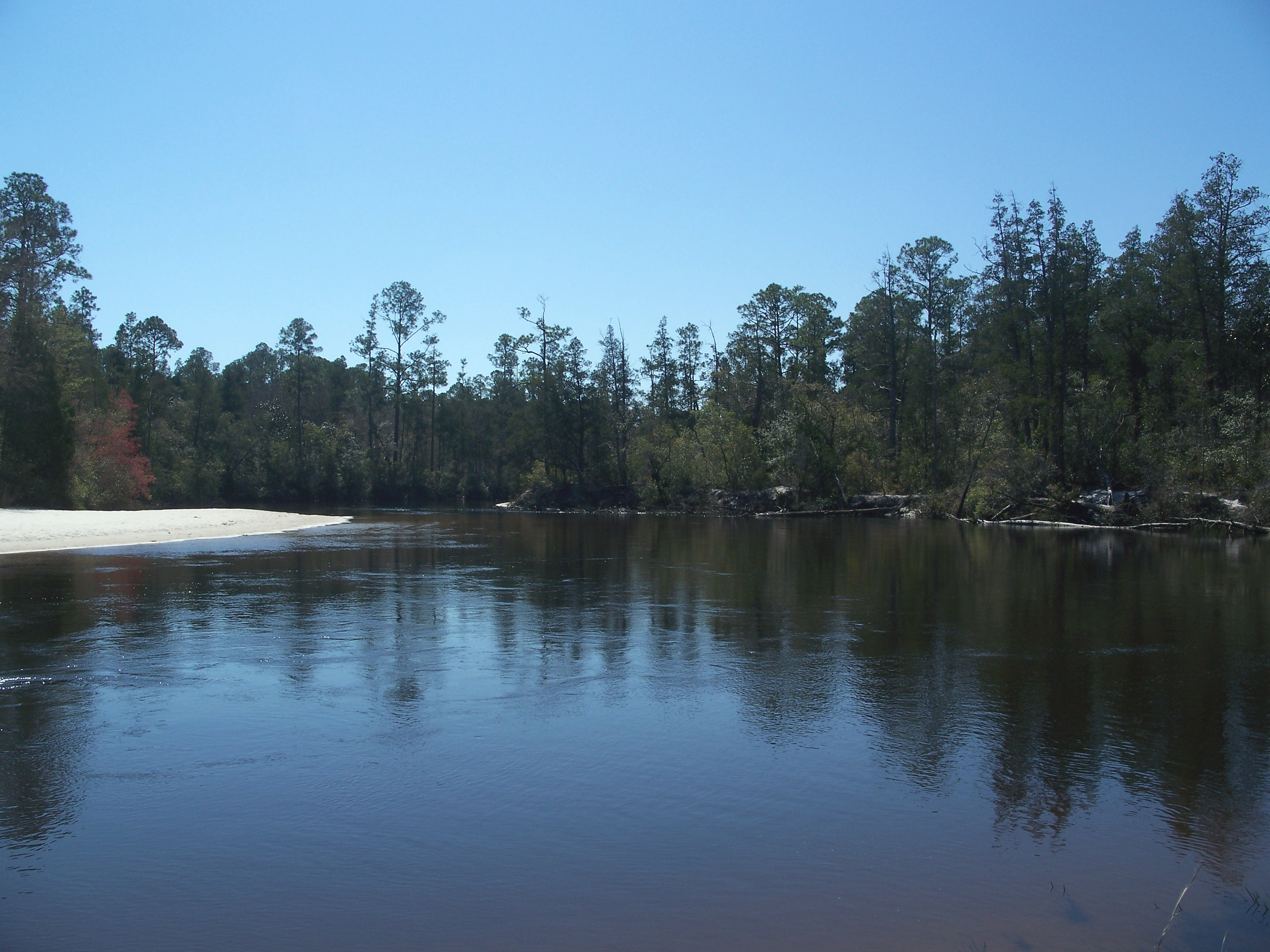
Blackwater River in Blackwater River State Park

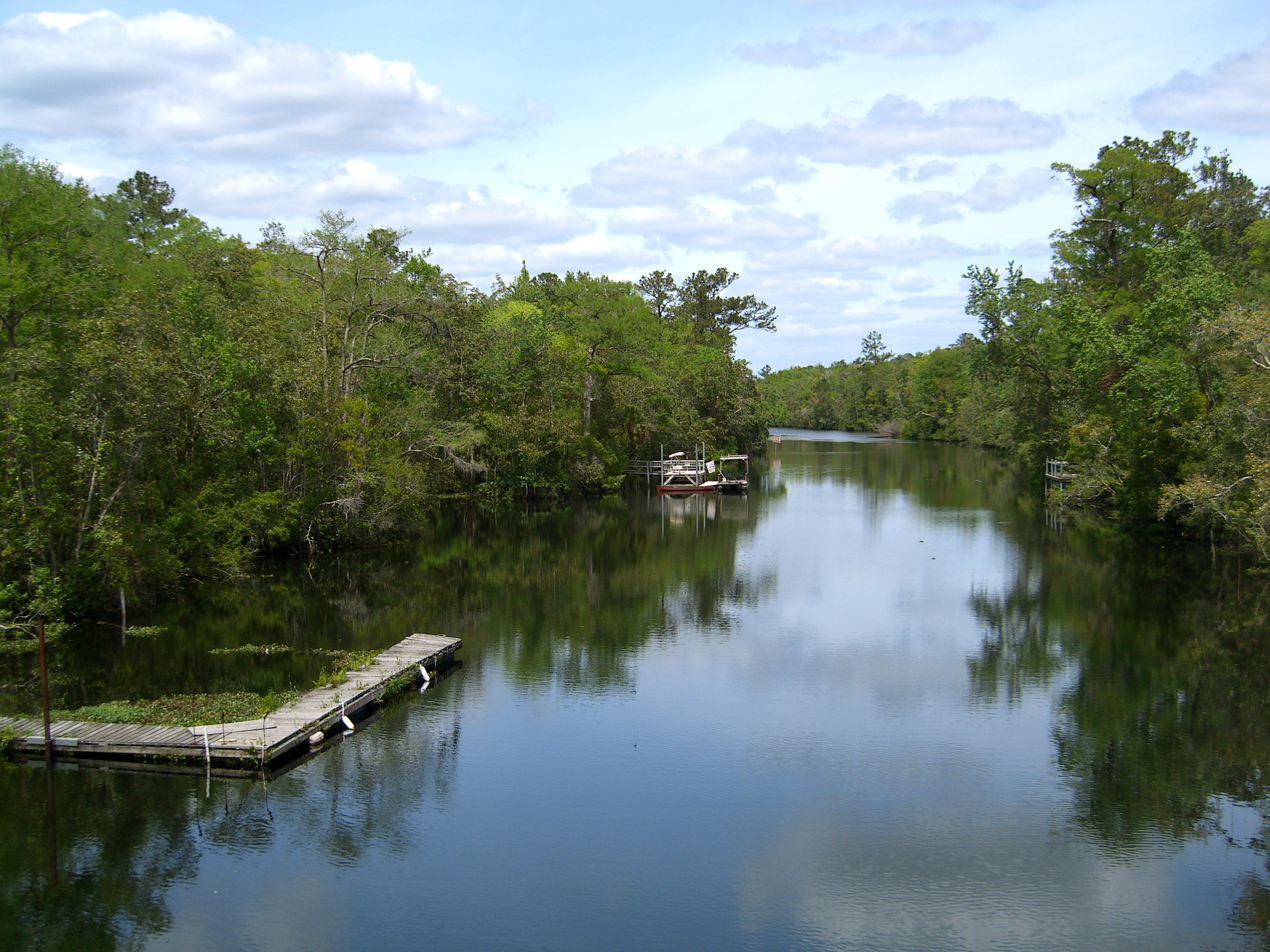
St. Marks River

Rivers are listed as they enter the gulf from south to north, then west. Tributaries are listed as they enter their main stem from downstream to upstream.

- Joe River
- Shark River
- Harney River
- Broad River
- Rodgers River
- Lostmans River
- Chatham River
- Huston River
- Lopez River
- New River in Collier County
- Turner River
- Barron River
- Fakahatchee River
- Whitney River
- Big Marco River
- Henderson Creek
- Cocohatchee River
- Imperial River
- Estero River
- Caloosahatchee River
  - Billy Creek
  - Orange River
- Peace River
  - Saddle Creek
  - Peace Creek
  - Bowlegs Creek
  - Little Charlie Creek
  - Joshua Creek
  - Charlie Creek
  - Payne Creek
  - Prairie Creek
  - Horse Creek
  - Shell Creek
- Myakka River
  - Myakkahatchee Creek
- Manatee River
  - Wares Creek
  - Braden River
    - Cooper Creek
- Little Manatee River
- Alafia River – Buckhorn Spring, Lithia Springs
- Palm River
- Hillsborough River – Crystal Springs
  - New River in Pasco County
- Anclote River
- Pithlachascotee River
- Weeki Wachee River – Weeki Wachee Springs
- Chassahowitzka River
- Homosassa River – Homosassa Springs
- Crystal River
- Withlacoochee River (central Florida)
  - Rainbow River – Rainbow Springs
  - Little Withlacoochee River
- Waccasassa River
  - Wekiva River (Gulf Hammock, Levy County)
- Suwannee River – Suwannee Springs, Hart Springs, Ginnie Springs, Fanning Springs, Manatee Springs, Otter Springs, Troy Spring
  - Santa Fe River
    - Ichetucknee River – Ichetucknee Springs
    - New River
  - Withlacoochee River (north Florida) – Madison Blue Springs
  - Alapaha River – Alapaha Rise Spring
    - Alapahoochee River
- Steinhatchee River
- Fenholloway River
- Econfina River
- Aucilla River – Nutall Rise
  - Wacissa River – Wacissa Springs, Aucilla Spring,
- Pinhook River
- St. Marks River – St. Marks Spring
  - East River
  - Wakulla River – Wakulla Springs
- Ochlockonee River
  - Sopchoppy River
  - Telogia Creek
  - Little River
- Crooked River
- Carrabelle River
  - New River
- Apalachicola River
  - Jackson River
  - Chipola River – Baltzell Spring, Blue Hole Spring
  - Chattahoochee River
- Econfina Creek
- Choctawhatchee River – Vortex Spring
  - Holmes Creek
  - Pea River
- East Bay River
- Yellow River
  - Shoal River
- Blackwater River
  - Big Coldwater Creek
  - Big Juniper Creek
- Escambia River
- Perdido River

== Alphabetically ==
- Alafia River
- Alapaha River
- Alapahoochee River
- Alexander Springs Creek
- Amelia River
- Anclote River
- Apalachicola River
- Arlington River
- Aucilla River
- Banana River
- Barron River
- Bells River
- Big Coldwater Creek
- Big Juniper Creek
- Big Marco River
- Billy Creek
- Black Creek
- Blackwater River
- Bonnet Creek
- Braden River
- Broad River
- Broward River
- Caloosahatchee River
- Carrabelle River
- Cedar River
- Chassahowitzka River
- Chatham River
- Chattahoochee River
- Chipola River
- Choctawhatchee River
- Cocohatchee River
- Crane Creek
- Crooked River
- Cross Creek
- Crystal River
- Cypress Creek
- Dead River (Kissimmee River tributary)
- Dead River (Lake County, Florida)
- Doctors Lake
- Dunns Creek
- East Bay River
- East River
- Eau Gallie River
- Econfina Creek
- Econfina River
- Econlockhatchee River
- Elbow Creek
- Escambia River
- Estero River
- Etonia Creek
- Fakahatchee River
- Fenholloway River
- Fisheating Creek
- Fort George River
- Guana River
- Haines Creek
- Halifax River
- Harney River
- Henderson Creek
- Hillsboro River
- Hillsborough River
- Holmes Creek
- Homosassa River
- Hontoon Dead River
- Huston River
- Ichetucknee River
- Imperial River
- Indian River
- Indian River North
- Istokpoga Creek
- Jackson River
- Joe River
- Julington Creek
- Kissimmee River
- Lake Jesup
- Lake Marion Creek
- Little Econlockhatchee River
- Little Manatee River
- Little River (Biscayne Bay)
- Little River (Ochlockonee River tributary)
- Little Trout River
- Little Wekiva River
- Little Withlacoochee River
- Lopez River
- Lostmans River
- Loxahatchee River
- Manatee River
- Matanzas River
- Miami River
- Middle River
- Myakka River
- Myakkahatchee Creek
- Nassau River
- New River (Broward County)
- New River (Collier County)
- New River (Franklin County)
- New River (Pasco County)
- New River (Union/Bradford County)
- Ochlockonee River
- Ocklawaha River
- Oleta River
- Orange Creek
- Orange River
- Ortega River
- Pablo Creek
- Palatlakaha River
- Palm River
- Pea River
- Peace River
- Perdido River
- Pinhook River
- Pithlachascotee River
- Pottsburg Creek
- Rainbow River
- Reedy Creek
- Ribault River
- Rice Creek
- Rodgers River
- Saint Sebastian River
- Salt Springs River
- San Sebastian River
- Santa Fe River
- Shark River
- Shell Creek
- Shingle Creek
- Shoal River
- Sisters Creek
- Snell Creek
- Sopchoppy River
- South Amelia River
- Spruce Creek
- St. Johns River
- St. Lucie River
- St. Marks River
- St. Marys River
- Steinhatchee River
- Stranahan River
- Suwannee River
- Taylor Creek
- Telogia Creek
- Thomas Creek
- Tolomato River
- Tomoka River
- Trout River
- Turkey Creek
- Turner River
- Waccasassa River
- Wacissa River
- Wakulla River
- Weeki Wachee River
- Wekiva River (Gulf Hammock)
- Wekiva River
- Whitney River
- Whittenhorse Creek
- Withlacoochee River (central Florida)
- Withlacoochee River (north Florida)
- Yellow River

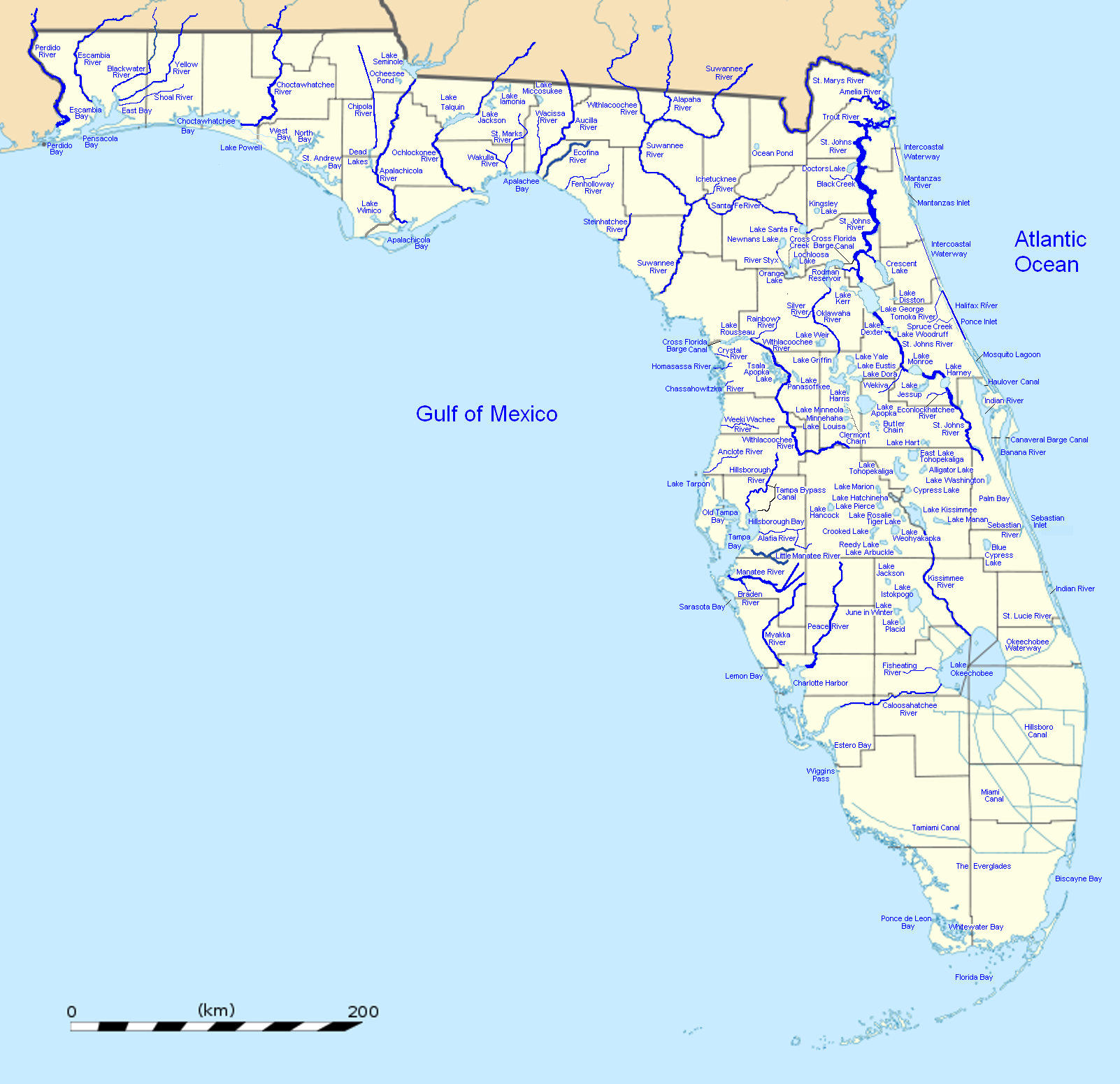

== See also ==
- Geology of Florida
- List of rivers in the United States
- List of springs in Florida
- Outstanding Florida Waters
