= Baker Block Museum =

Local history museum in Baker, Florida

Coordinates: 30.7974°N 86.6819°W

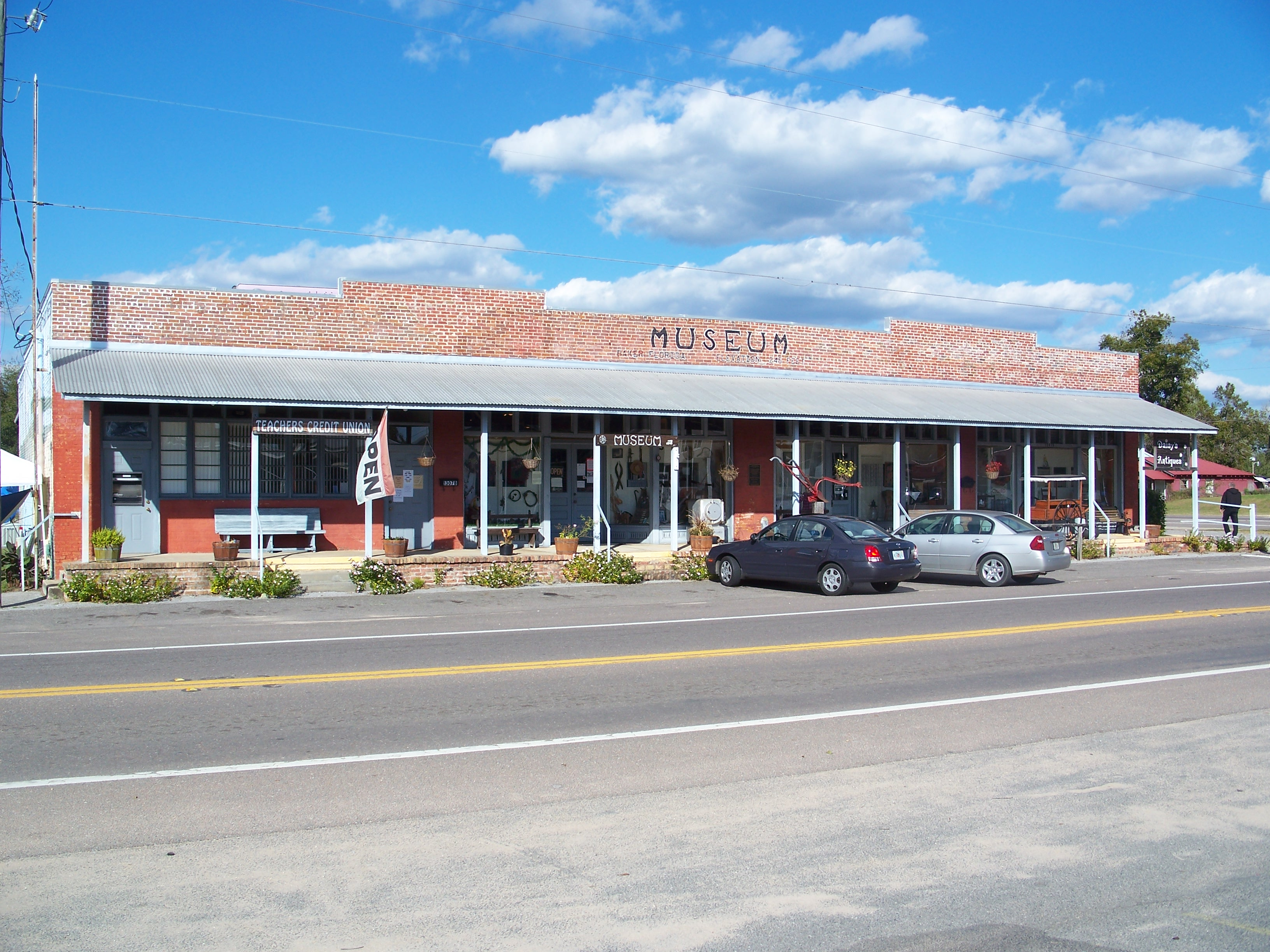
Baker Block Museum

The Baker Block Museum is a local history and genealogy museum located in Baker, Florida, focused on the history of the Florida panhandle with emphasis on Okaloosa County.

The museum's purpose is to preserve and display artifacts and documents of the early development of the Florida panhandle, particularly Okaloosa County; to educate the public on technology, history, and impact of historic events including early culture of Spanish, French, Dutch, and Native Americans, the naval stores industry, the rail transportation industry and military installations in the State of Florida, and more specifically along the Yellow and Shoal Rivers, timber industries, pioneer communities, and fisheries.

Its exhibits include antiques, tools, period displays, and a heritage park consisting of a post office, mill, log cabin, blacksmith shop, corn crib, and outhouse. It is located at the corner of State Roads 189 and 4 in Baker.

The museum, a 501-3(c) non-profit organization, operates under the auspices of the North Okaloosa Historical Association, Inc. (NOHA), founded in 1992 by Jeanette and Charles Henderson. The board of directors meets monthly to recommend, approve, establish policy, and receive input on the operation of the museum. The museum depends on state and county funding, sponsors, and volunteers to provide necessary operating funds.

Admission to the museum is free and is open Tuesday through Friday from 10 a.m. to 3:30 pm, and every third Saturday of the month from 10 a.m. to 3:30 p.m
