= Shoal River Headwaters State Park =

State park in Florida, United States

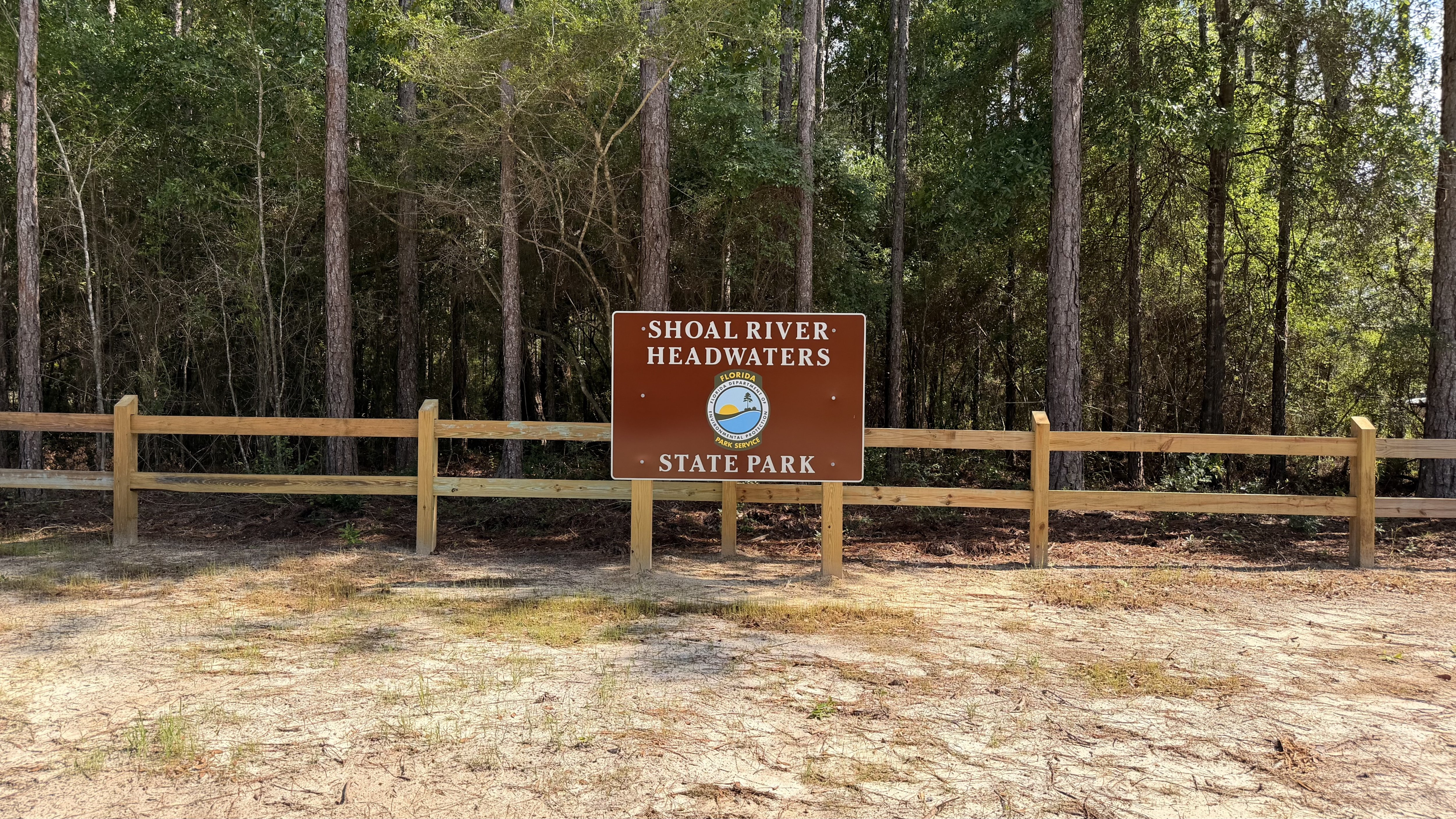
- Entrance to the park off King Lake Road

- Location within Florida Location within the United States
- Interactive map of Shoal River Headwaters State Park
- Location: Walton County, Florida, United States
- Nearest city: DeFuniak Springs
- Coordinates: 30.77341°N 86.20610°W
- Area: 2,480 acres (1,000 ha)
- Established: January 23, 2026
- Governing body: Florida Department of Environmental Protection

Shoal River Headwaters State Park is a Florida state park in Walton County, Florida, United States, west of DeFuniak Springs. The park protects part of the headwaters of the Shoal River, which crosses its northwestern corner, along with Gum Creek, a tributary that runs along the park's northern side. It lies within the Northwest Florida Sentinel Landscape and serves as buffer land for nearby Eglin Air Force Base, supporting military readiness while linking with other conservation lands to form connected wildlife corridors. Its sandhill, flatwoods, slope forest, and floodplain communities provide habitat for rare and imperiled species, including the gopher tortoise and the eastern indigo snake.

The land was part of the state's Upper Shoal River project, placed on the Florida Forever priority list in 2003. The Trust for Public Land bought the property with state and private funding in 2025 and conveyed it to the state. The park opened on January 23, 2026, as the 176th unit of the Florida state park system, and is administered by the Florida Park Service. It is open for hiking, bicycling, and wildlife viewing on four unimproved trails while the state develops long-term recreation and land management plans with public input.

== History ==
The Florida Forever program's Acquisition and Restoration Council added the Upper Shoal River project to the Florida Forever Priority List on December 5, 2003, and placed it in the program's Critical Natural Lands category on December 9, 2011. The project covered two tracts of timberland within the Shoal River watershed totaling about 12,035 acres (4,870 ha): the 9,727 acres (3,936 ha) Pine Log Creek tract near the Okaloosa County line, and the Gum Creek tract of about 2,300 acres (930 ha), some 5 miles (8.0 km) to the southeast. The state's plan for the project listed The Nature Conservancy and the United States Department of Defense as acquisition partners. It proposed that the project become a state forest and wildlife management area co-managed by the Florida Forest Service (FFS) and the Florida Fish and Wildlife Conservation Commission (FWC), with the Division of Recreation and Parks managing the Gum Creek tract.

In December 2024, Governor Ron DeSantis and the Florida Cabinet approved $317 million in conservation spending, including $111 million through Florida Forever for 24,113 acres (9,758 ha). Among the approved purchases was a 2,483 acres (1,005 ha) acquisition within the Upper Shoal River project that would create a new state park. The Trust for Public Land completed the purchase in the spring of 2025, with support from Florida Forever, Atira Conservation, the EJK Foundation, and the Partnership for Gulf Coast Land Conservation, and conveyed the land to the state. Atira Conservation reported the property at 2,491 acres (1,008 ha) and its cost at $9.01 million.

The park opened on January 23, 2026, with a celebration and guided tour, as the 176th unit of the Florida state park system. It opened at 2,480 acres (1,000 ha) for passive recreation while the Florida Park Service began working with the public on long-term recreation and land management plans. According to Atira Conservation, the state's management planning process covers ten years and includes public input.

== Geography and climate ==
The park occupies the Gum Creek tract of the Upper Shoal River Florida Forever project. The project's other tract, the larger Pine Log Creek tract, lies about 5 miles (8.0 km) to the northwest and is not part of the park. The area lies in the Northern Highlands physiographic province, where some of Florida's highest elevations occur. Its terrain consists of high, rolling sandy hills that drain downslope through mesic and wet flatwoods and slope forests into bottomland and floodplain forests along seepage streams feeding the Shoal River. Although both tracts had been managed for timber, the state's 2024 assessment found the ecotones next to the forested wetlands and seepage streams intact and undisturbed. Together the two tracts contain about 20 miles (32 km) of headwater tributary streams.

The Shoal River crosses the park's northwestern corner. Gum Creek runs along the park's northern side toward the river and is joined near the park entrance by Narrows Creek. A small lake in the southwest of the park is reached by the Steephead Lake Trail. The Shoal River originates in Walton County and runs 33 miles (53 km) to join the Yellow River near Crestview as the Yellow's major tributary. The Yellow River in turn flows into Blackwater Bay, part of the Pensacola Bay system. The Shoal River is designated an Outstanding Florida Water, the state's highest level of surface water protection.

=== Climate ===
The park has a humid subtropical climate (Köppen Cfa). The nearest long-term weather station, at Crestview's Bob Sikes Airport about 19 miles (31 km) to the west, records average monthly temperatures from 50.6 °F (10.3 °C) in January to 81.8 °F (27.7 °C) in July. Daily highs reach 90 °F (32 °C) or more on about 98 days a year, and lows fall to freezing or below on about 39 nights. Precipitation averages 63.6 inches (1,615 mm) a year, with July the wettest month at 7.92 inches (201 mm) and October the driest at 4.09 inches (104 mm).

Climate data for Crestview Bob Sikes Airport, the nearest weather station (1991 to 2020 normals, extremes 1948 to present)
Month	Jan	Feb	Mar	Apr	May	Jun	Jul	Aug	Sep	Oct	Nov	Dec	Year
Record high °F (°C)	85 (29)	85 (29)	90 (32)	95 (35)	101 (38)	104 (40)	105 (41)	103 (39)	102 (39)	101 (38)	90 (32)	84 (29)	105 (41)
Mean daily maximum °F (°C)	62.7 (17.1)	66.8 (19.3)	73.3 (22.9)	79.4 (26.3)	86.9 (30.5)	91.1 (32.8)	92.4 (33.6)	91.7 (33.2)	88.6 (31.4)	81.1 (27.3)	71.6 (22.0)	64.6 (18.1)	79.2 (26.2)
Daily mean °F (°C)	50.6 (10.3)	54.1 (12.3)	60.0 (15.6)	66.0 (18.9)	73.7 (23.2)	79.8 (26.6)	81.8 (27.7)	81.4 (27.4)	77.7 (25.4)	68.3 (20.2)	58.1 (14.5)	52.6 (11.4)	67.0 (19.4)
Mean daily minimum °F (°C)	38.5 (3.6)	41.4 (5.2)	46.7 (8.2)	52.6 (11.4)	60.6 (15.9)	68.5 (20.3)	71.1 (21.7)	71.1 (21.7)	66.9 (19.4)	55.5 (13.1)	44.6 (7.0)	40.6 (4.8)	54.8 (12.7)
Record low °F (°C)	8 (−13)	10 (−12)	17 (−8)	29 (−2)	38 (3)	52 (11)	57 (14)	56 (13)	40 (4)	28 (−2)	17 (−8)	9 (−13)	8 (−13)
Average precipitation inches (mm)	5.66 (144)	4.58 (116)	5.66 (144)	4.92 (125)	4.13 (105)	5.96 (151)	7.92 (201)	6.42 (163)	5.06 (129)	4.09 (104)	4.27 (108)	4.93 (125)	63.60 (1,615)
Average precipitation days (≥ 0.01 in)	6.2	5.6	5.6	5.0	5.1	8.3	10.5	10.1	6.4	4.4	4.8	6.1	78.1
Source 1: NOAA normals
Source 2: NWS extremes

== Ecology ==
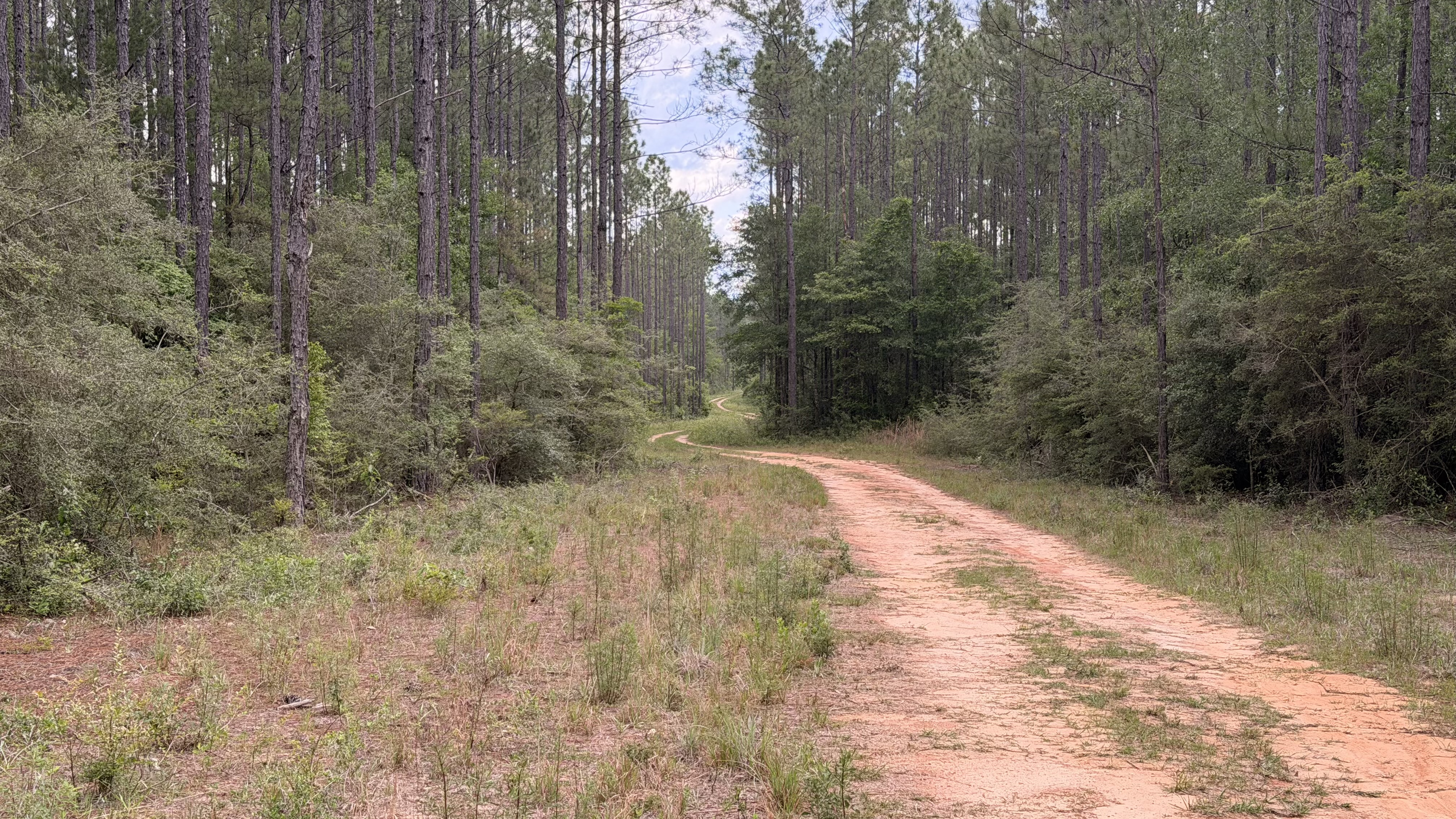
One of the park's two-track trails.

=== Flora ===
The state's 2024 Florida Forever assessment describes vegetation across the whole Upper Shoal River project, of which the park's Gum Creek tract makes up about a fifth. Most of the project's original pinelands had been converted to pine plantations, largely planted in even-aged compartments, and stands of loblolly, longleaf, and slash pine had been thinned throughout both tracts. Scattered longleaf pine regeneration was present on both.

About 750 acres (300 ha) of sandhill remained in moderately good condition, with an intact and diverse native ground cover that includes wiregrass. Upland hardwood or slope forest covered about 300 acres (120 ha), and about 100 acres (40 ha) of mesic and wet flatwoods were interspersed among the other communities. Forested wetlands, made up of baygall, floodplain, and bottomland forest, were the most extensive natural community at about 1,550 acres (630 ha), while the seepage stream communities themselves covered about 10 acres (4.0 ha).

Rare or imperiled plants documented in the project include Arkansas oak, mountain laurel, red pitcher plant, and white-top pitcher plant. The Florida Natural Areas Inventory records the red pitcher plant there as Wherry's redflower pitcherplant (Sarracenia rubra subsp. wherryi). Nine more species known from nearby may also occur: bog button, Florida flame azalea, hairy wild indigo, Harper's yellow-eyed grass, panhandle lily, sandhill sedge, silky camellia, umbrella magnolia, and yellow fringeless orchid.

=== Fauna ===
The state's 2024 assessment lists eleven rare or imperiled animal species as occurring or likely to occur in the Upper Shoal River project: the blackmouth shiner, eastern diamondback rattlesnake, eastern indigo snake, Florida black bear, gopher frog, gopher tortoise, little blue heron, pine barrens treefrog, Sherman's fox squirrel, southern pine snake, and white ibis. Of these, the pine barrens treefrog has been documented in the project area. The assessment notes that gopher tortoise burrows shelter other declining species, including the eastern indigo snake and gopher frog. It also notes that black bears have been documented using the riparian corridors of the Shoal River and its tributaries in Okaloosa County, which are likely migratory routes for the species. Game species observed in the project area included mourning dove, white-tailed deer, and wild turkey.

The blackmouth shiner, a small minnow listed as threatened in Florida, has been collected in the state only at isolated localities in the Blackwater, Yellow, and Shoal rivers. The Florida Natural Areas Inventory gives its Shoal River locality as near Mossy Head, in Walton County. A 2011 status review by the FWC described the Shoal River record as historical, with no collections there since the 1980s.

Florida State Parks lists birds seen in the park, including owls, pileated woodpeckers, red-headed woodpeckers, blue jays, eastern bluebirds, swallow-tailed kites, bald eagles, wild turkeys, bobwhite quail, and red-shouldered hawks. Deer, skunks, snakes, and gopher tortoises are among the other wildlife visitors may see.

== Management ==
The state's 2024 Florida Forever assessment rated the Upper Shoal River project a medium-need tract that would require up-front resource management, including the frequent use of prescribed fire. Fire had not burned on either tract for several years, allowing fuel loads to build up. Approximately 75 percent of the project area had ground cover disturbed by past silviculture, so restoration would take more effort. The assessment's management prospectus, written when the FFS and the FWC were expected to manage most of the project, called for thinning dense pine stands and removing timber species not suited to the site so that native ground cover and appropriate tree species could regenerate. It also called for restoring mesic and wet flatwoods previously managed for timber, protecting sensitive wetlands, and controlling exotic species. Biological surveys and a historic vegetation analysis would set restoration targets, prescribed burns would be conducted in the growing season where appropriate, and any archaeological or historic sites would be managed in coordination with the state's Division of Historical Resources.

Florida law requires the manager of state conservation lands to submit a land management plan at least every ten years. For land within a state park, the plan must be developed with input from an advisory group that includes the managing agency, local property owners, the local soil and water conservation district, a local conservation organization, and a local elected official, along with the FWC and the Department of Agriculture and Consumer Services where imperiled species habitat is present. The advisory group must hold at least one public hearing in the county where the land lies. At the park's opening, Florida State Parks said it would work with the public on long-term recreation and land management plans. According to Atira Conservation, the planning process covers ten years and includes substantial public input.

== Recreation ==
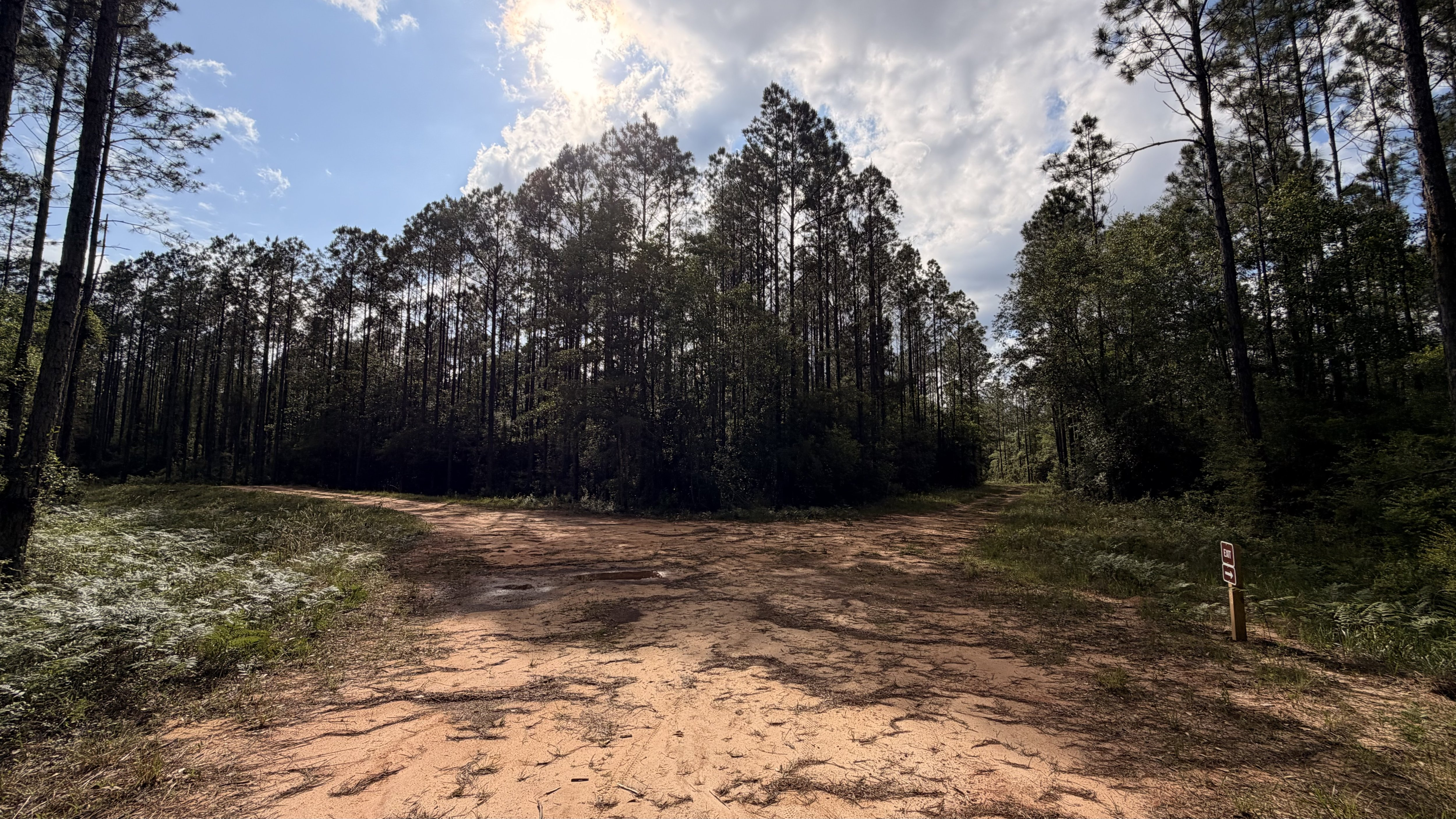
A junction between two of the park's trails.

The park is open for hiking, bicycling, birding, picnicking, and wildlife viewing. Four unimproved multiuse trails, open to hikers and cyclists but closed to vehicles, range from 0.25 miles (0.40 km) to 6 miles (9.7 km) in length. (Note: The park's handheld map gives the Shoal River Headwaters Loop Trail as 6.0 miles (9.7 km); the Florida State Parks amenities page describes the "fire line loop trail" as approximately 8.7 miles (14.0 km).) Parking is limited to five spaces. Four picnic tables stand at the parking area, with more at intervals of roughly 1 mile (1.6 km) along the trail, and a portable restroom is provided at the park entrance. The Florida Department of Environmental Protection has said that camping and paddling along the Shoal River may be offered in the future.
