= Gottfried Creek =

River in the United States of America

Coordinates: 26°56′1″N 82°20′38″W

Gottfried Creek is a stream in the U.S. state of Florida.

Gottfried Creek took the name of the Gottfried family, the original owners of the land where the creek is located.

== See also ==
- List of rivers of Florida
