= Shark River =

Shark River may refer to:

== Rivers ==
- Shark River (Florida), U.S.
- Shark River (New Jersey), U.S.
- Shark River (Trinidad), a river of Trinidad and Tobago

== Other uses ==
- Shark River (film), a 1953 American film
