= Tolomato =

Tolomato can refer to:

- Nuestra Señora de Guadalupe de Tolomato, also called Mission Tolomato, a Spanish Christian mission in Georgia, in Spanish Florida, in the colonial era.
- Tolomato Cemetery, a cemetery established in the Nuestra Señora de Guadalupe de Tolomato.
- Tolomato River, part of the Intracoastal Waterway in Florida.
- Guana Tolomato Matanzas National Estuarine Research Reserve
