= Hogtown Creek =

River in the United States of America

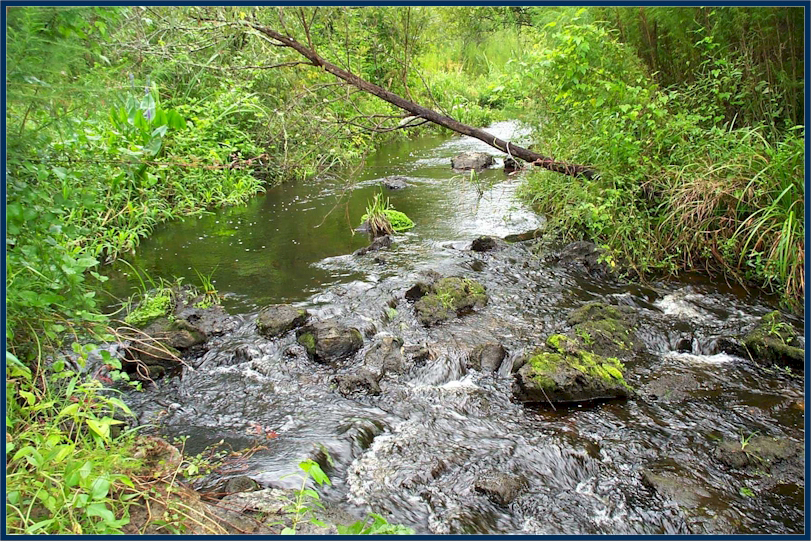
- Hogtown Creek, August 2011

Location
- Country: United States

Physical characteristics
- Source: Hogtown Creek watershed
- Mouth: Haile Sink, north of Lake Kanapaha
  - location: Gainesville
  - coordinates: 29°37′57″N 82°23′43.8″W
- Length: 4.14 mi (6.66 km)
- Basin size: 21 mi^{2} (54.39km^{2})

Hogtown Creek is a small creek that is located in Gainesville, Florida. It begins in the Hogtown Creek watershed area that encompasses 21 square miles across both natural and developed areas of land. Water seeps into the ground in the pine barrens and fern-covered wetlands, where the creek begins to form. Out of the 21 square miles of its drainage basin area, only 20% remains in its natural state. 65% of land was converted to low-density residential areas, and 15% of the land was converted to commercial districts.

The creek flows through the Hogtown Creek Prairie and recharges a nearby Floridian aquifer via Haile Sink.

== Geology ==
The creeks in Gainesville, including the Hogtown Creek, first formed when central and north Florida first rose out of the ocean approximately 30 million years ago. The creeks cut into the phosphate layer of the ground, where it holds fossilized remains of aquatic and terrestrial animals. Common findings include shark teeth, and rarely, saber teeth and turtle shell fragments.

== Watershed ==
The creek consists of dredged channels, sinuous streams, and wetlands. Much of the base flow of the creek comes from small, nearby aquifers that seep discharging groundwater. Development of nearby land had caused certain parts of the creek, such as the area between NW 39th and NW 16th streets to be severely eroded. Because of the erosion, the stream bed is sand smothered, and fallen trees are not uncommon in the area.

Sand smothering is a costly, continuous problem throughout many parts of the creek, and methods are ongoing to remove the excess sediment, although the currents methods are not effective enough to prevent further sediment buildup. Banks near the stream are vertical, tall, and deeply undercut; there is a lack of native vegetation that prevents erosion, which leads to the subsequent erosion of the area.

== Habitat and Biology ==
Hogtown Creek is a Bottomland Forest located on the Hogtown Creek floodplain-depression marsh. The forests surrounding Hogtown Creek consist of low-lying, closed canopy of tall trees that provide adequate shade to the stream and the stream bed. Ground cover is limited near the trees, but in areas where tree density is lower, ferns, perennial herbs, and grasses cover the ground. Plant species common to the area include water oak, live oak, red maple, sweetgum, loblolly pine, white cedar, cabbage palm, diamond-leaf oak, southern magnolia, loblolly bay, swamp tupelo, spruce pine, American beech, dahoon holly, wax myrtle, swamp dogwood, Florida elm, stiffcornel dogwood, and American hornbeam.

Invasive plant species are also common in the area, including the loquat and glossy privet. In 2004, the University of Florida took on a grant of $21,063.13 to remove these species, and the project is currently ongoing.

The creek flows mostly through urbanized and developed land with sparsely distributed native wetlands and forests. During storm events, sediment is mobilized and deposited further downstream, halting the creation of a stable substrate within the creek. Without the stable substrate, aquatic vegetation remains non-existent. Despite efforts to reduce the amount of excess sediment in the stream bed, consistent erosion of the stream banks and lack of native vegetation creates a persistent problem.

== Tributaries ==
The creek has many tributaries including the Possum, Rattlesnake, Elizabeth, and Springstead creeks.

== See also ==
- List of rivers of Florida
