= Baker, Florida =

- unincorporated community
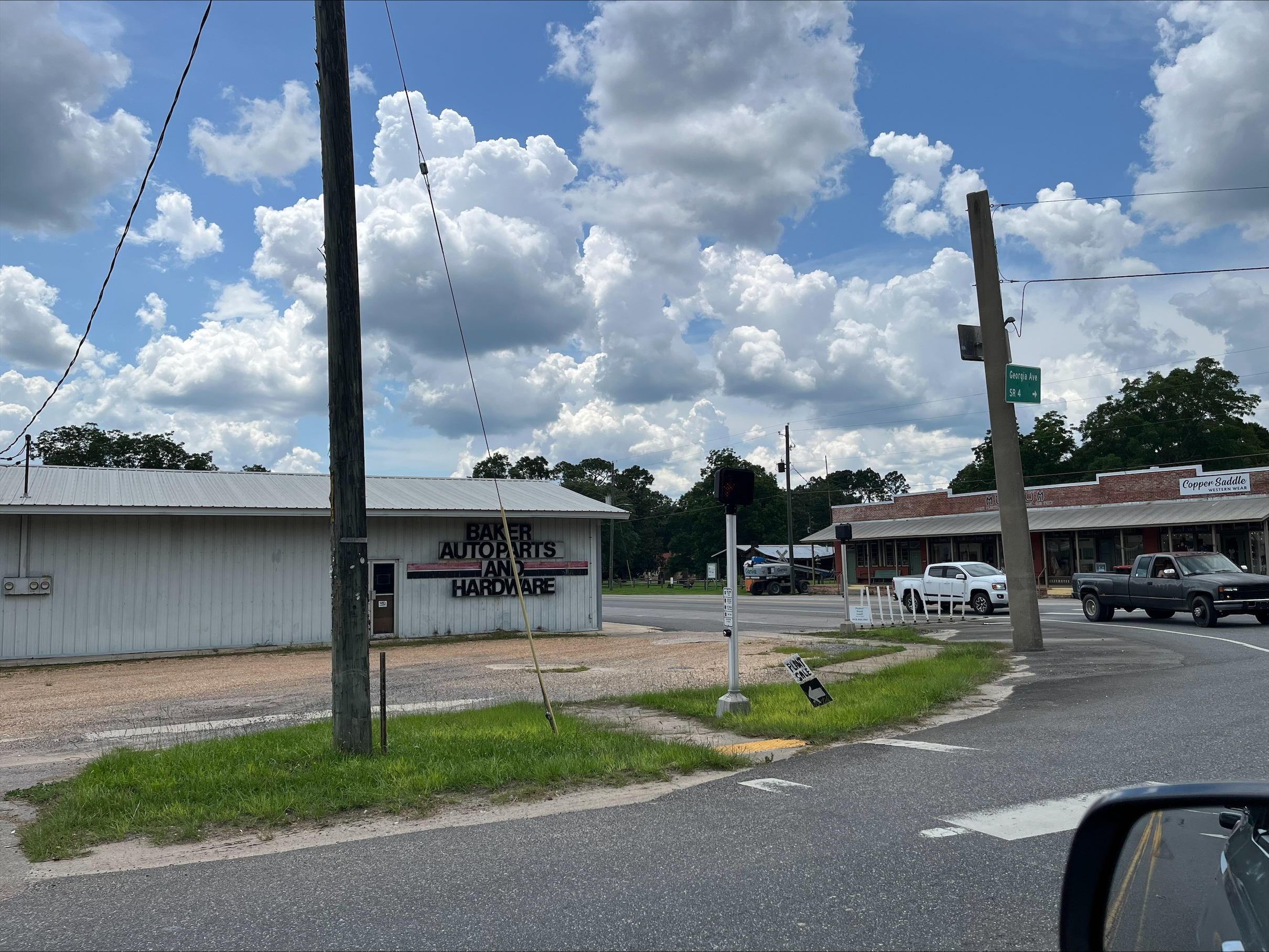
- Downtown Baker

- Location within Florida Location within the United States
- Coordinates: 30.797132°N 86.681344°W
- Country: United States
- State: Florida
- County: Okaloosa

Population (2007)
  - Total: 900
- Time zone: UTC-6 (Central (CST))
  - Summer (DST): UTC-5 (CDT)
- ZIP codes: 32531
- Area code: 850

Baker is an unincorporated community in Okaloosa County, Florida, United States. It is located approximately 10 miles (16 km) northwest of the county seat, Crestview, in the Florida Panhandle. A stop on the Florida, Alabama and Gulf Railroad, Baker was platted in 1910 and grew up around the timber and turpentine industries.

The Baker Block Museum is in Baker. Baker is home to Baker School, a public school in the Okaloosa County School District. The Skypark Estates Owner's Association Airport (18FD) is a private airport with a 3,000 foot east-west turf runway located in Baker.
