= Imperial River (Florida) =

River in Florida, United States

Location
- Country: United States

Physical characteristics
- Source
  - location: Kehl Canal and marshland
  - coordinates: 26°22′16″N 81°41′23″W
  - elevation: 14 feet (4.3 m)
- Mouth
  - location: Estero Bay
- Length: 9.3 mi (15.0 km)
- Basin size: Estero Bay

The Imperial River is a river in southwest Florida in the United States. It is fed by the Kehl Canal and marshland at 26°22′16″N 81°41′23″W, just east of the city limits of Bonita Springs in unincorporated southwest Lee County. It is approximately 9.3 miles (15.0 km) long, from its headwaters just east of I-75 in the Flint Pen Strand, through downtown Bonita Springs and to its mouth at the north end of Fishtrap Bay, near the southern end of Estero Bay. It was originally named Surveyors Creek before the city was developed. The river is part of The Great Calusa Blueway.

On the east side of the Tamiami Trail (U.S. Route 41) bridge, the Imperial River Boat Ramp provides boaters and kayakers with a place to launch their vessels. There is also a small fishing pier onsite. On the west side of the bridge, an 18.3-acre (7.4 ha) park is under construction which will consist of 2,000 feet (610 m) of river frontage and a boardwalk, fishing pier, boat slips and an observation platform with a view of an eagle's nest. Riverside Park in the downtown area provides river access and a bandshell for community events and concerts.

== See also ==
- List of Florida rivers
