= Pottsburg Creek =

River in the United States of America

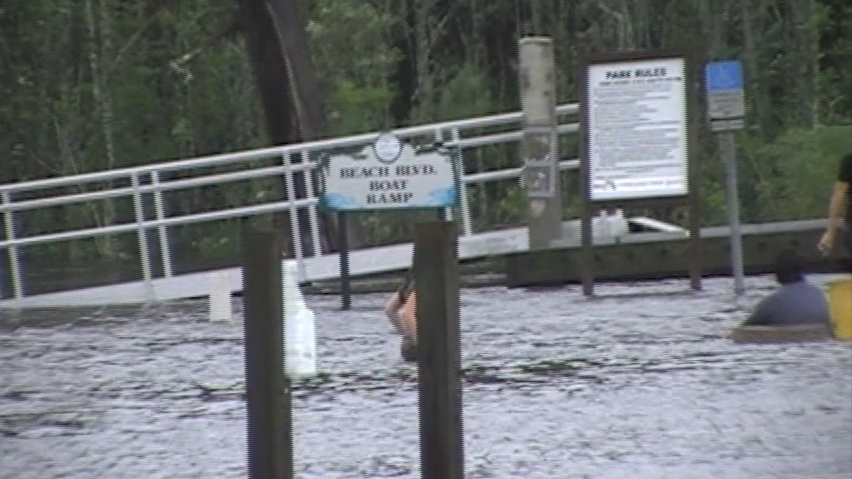
- The flooded boat ramp of Pottsburg Creek during Tropical Storm Fay.

Location
- Country: United States

Physical characteristics
- Source
  - location: Pond near J. Turner Butler Blvd.
- Mouth
  - location: St. Johns River near Arlington.
- Length: 16 mi (26 km)

The Pottsburg Creek is an urban creek in Jacksonville, Florida. Its beginning is near a retention pond behind the old studios of WJXX. It outputs into the Arlington River (north of Atlantic Boulevard and west of Arlington Road) which in turn empties into the St. Johns River. The creek primarily flows through the heart of Jacksonville's Southside, and through southern parts of the Arlington neighborhood.

== Tour ==
The Pottsburg Creek originates in the Southpoint section of Jacksonville's Southside. The origins of the pond are unknown, however, most ideas point to a retention pond near a television studio formerly used by ABC affiliate WJXX. Historical records of Spanish land grants filed with the Florida territorial government, such as for the plot owned by Peter Bagley, indicate a tributary of the Arlington River named Pottsburg Creek on maps of the area as early as 1824. The creek starts out as a very narrow, and almost swamplike canal. The creek travels under busy J. Turner Butler Blvd., heading north. The creek here is very overgrown, and almost impossible to see while driving at the normal speed limit. The creek meanders north through suburban parts of Jacksonville, being fed directly or indirectly by heavy amounts of pollution and fertilizers. Many retention ponds and storm drains owned by JEA, the utility company, feed into this part of the creek. This creates a heavily fluctuating water level through this section. The creek continues north where it approaches U.S. 90/SR 212/Beach Blvd. Located along the creeks are several television transmitters, including ones for WFOX-TV, WJAX-TV, and WCWJ. The transmitters for WTLV, WJXT, and the digital transmitter for WJXX are also visible nearby, across busy Southside Blvd. This area is known as Killarney Shores. The creek begins to widen as it starts to head out of the southside area and into Arlington. The creek is also frequented by boat traffic due to the city boat ramp nearby. Soon the creek is joined by the spring run for Pottsburg Spring and the Little Pottsburg Creek. The creek widens even more as it passes under Atlantic Blvd. and out to the St. Johns River.

== Tributaries ==
The Pottsburg Creek is mainly fed by rainwater, retention ponds, and storm drain runoff. Other named tributaries include the Little Pottsburg Creek, Strawberry Creek, Silversmith Creek, and discharge from the Pottsburg Spring.

== See also ==
- List of rivers of Florida
