= Apalachicola River =

River in Southeastern U.S.

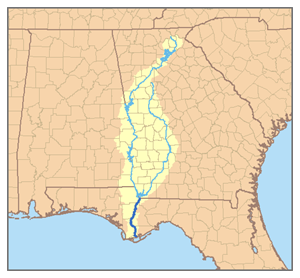
- Map of the Apalachicola River watershed showing the two main tributaries, the Chattahoochee River (left) and the Flint River (right).

Location
- Country: United States
- State: Florida

Physical characteristics
- Source: Lake Seminole
  - location: Chattahoochee, Florida
  - coordinates: 30°42′31″N 84°51′50″W
  - elevation: 75 ft (23 m)
- Mouth: Gulf of Mexico
  - location: Apalachicola, Florida
  - coordinates: 29°43′27″N 84°58′39″W
  - elevation: 0 ft (0 m)
- Length: 106 mi (171 km)
- Basin size: 19,500 mi^{2} (51,000 km^{2})
- Discharge
  - average: 19,602 cu ft/s (555.1 m^{3}/s)

The Apalachicola River /æpəlætʃɪˈkoʊlə/ is a river, approximately 106 miles (171 km) long, in the state of Florida. The river's large watershed, known as the Apalachicola, Chattahoochee and Flint (ACF) River Basin, drains an area of approximately 19,500 square miles (50,500 km^{2}) into the Gulf of Mexico. The distance to its furthest head waters (as the Chattahoochee River) in northeast Georgia is approximately 500 miles (800 km). Its name comes from Apalachicola Province, an association of Native American towns located on what is now the Chattahoochee River. The Spanish included what is now named the Chattahoochee River as part of one river, calling all of it from its origins in the southern Appalachian foothills down to the Gulf of Mexico the Apalachicola.

== Description ==
The river is formed on the state line between Florida and Georgia, near the town of Chattahoochee, Florida, approximately 60 miles (97 km) northeast of Panama City, by the confluence of the Flint and Chattahoochee rivers. The actual confluence is contained within the Lake Seminole reservoir formed by the Jim Woodruff Dam. It flows generally south through the forests of the Florida Panhandle, past Bristol. In northern Gulf County, it receives the Chipola River from the west. It flows into Apalachicola Bay, an inlet of the Gulf of Mexico, at Apalachicola, Florida. The lower 30 mi (48 km) of the river is surrounded by extensive swamps and wetlands, except at the coast.

The watershed contains nationally significant forests, with some of the highest biological diversity east of the Mississippi River and rivaling that of the Great Smoky Mountains. It has prominent areas of temperate deciduous forest as well as longleaf pine landscapes and flatwoods. Flooded areas have significant tracts of floodplain forest. All of these southeastern forest types were devastated by logging between 1880 and 1920, and the Apalachicola contains some of the finest remaining examples of old growth forest in the southeast. The endangered tree species Florida torreya is endemic to the region; it clings to forested slopes and bluffs in Torreya State Park along the east bank of the river. The highest point within the watershed is Blood Mountain at 4,458 ft (1,359 m), near the headwaters of the Chattahoochee River.

Where the river enters the Gulf of Mexico, it creates a rich array of wetlands varying in salinity. These include tidal marshes and seagrass meadows. Over 230,000 acres (93,000 ha) of this diverse delta complex are included within the Apalachicola National Estuarine Research Reserve. There are also dunes with coastal grasslands and interdunal swales.

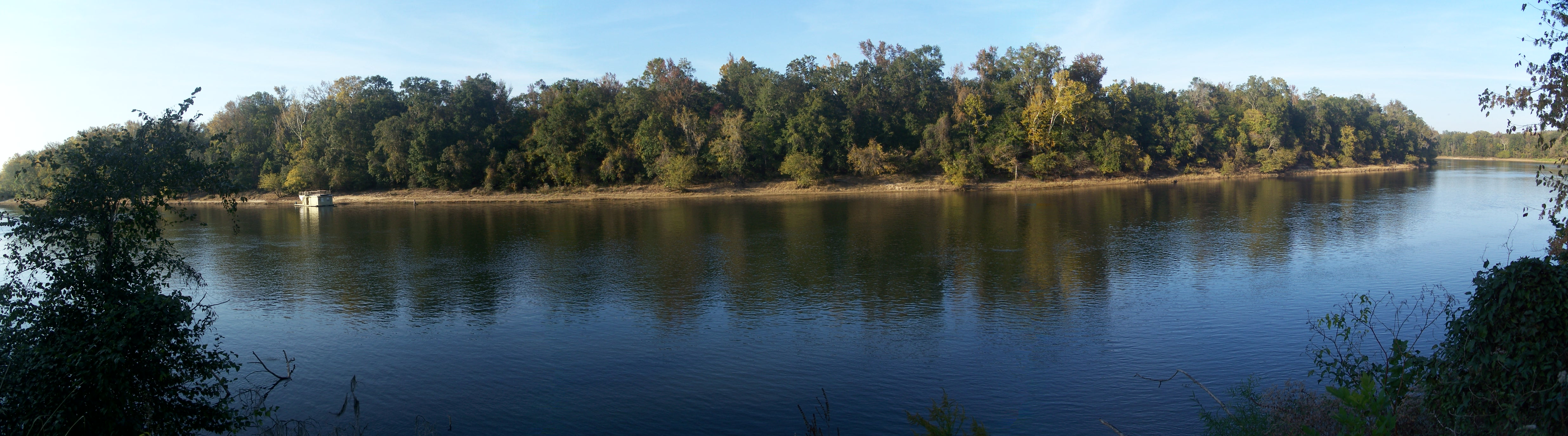
View of Apalachicola River at Torreya State Park

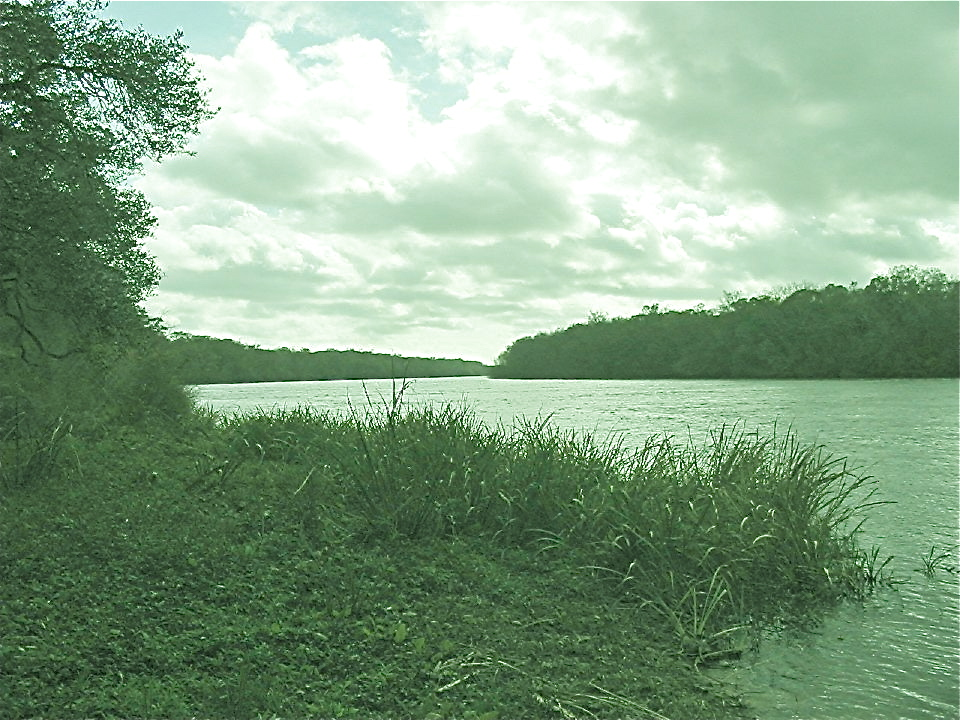
View of the Apalachicola River near Fort Gadsden, Florida

The basin of the Apalachicola River is also noted for its Tupelo honey, a high-quality monofloral honey, which is produced wherever the tupelo trees bloom in the southeastern United States. In a good harvest year, the value of the tupelo honey crop produced by a group of specialized Florida beekeepers approaches $900,000 each spring.

During Florida's British colonial period, the river formed the boundary between East Florida and West Florida. Geologically, the river links the coastal plain and Gulf Coast with the Appalachian Mountains.

Some of the remaining important areas of natural habitat along the river include Apalachicola National Forest, Torreya State Park, The Nature Conservancy Apalachicola Bluffs and Ravines Preserve, Tates Hell State Forest, and Apalachicola River Wildlife and Environmental Area, as well as the Apalachicola River Water Management Area. It has been suggested that this watershed should be nationally ranked and appreciated as being as significant as the Everglades or Great Smoky Mountains. To raise awareness about the importance of preserving the natural state of the river and its inhabitants, Florida film producer Elam Stoltzfus highlighted this system in a 2006 documentary broadcast on PBS.

The river forms the boundary between the Eastern and Central time zones in Florida, until it reaches the Jackson River. Thereafter, the Jackson River, which flows to the Gulf of Mexico, is the time zone boundary.

== List of crossings ==
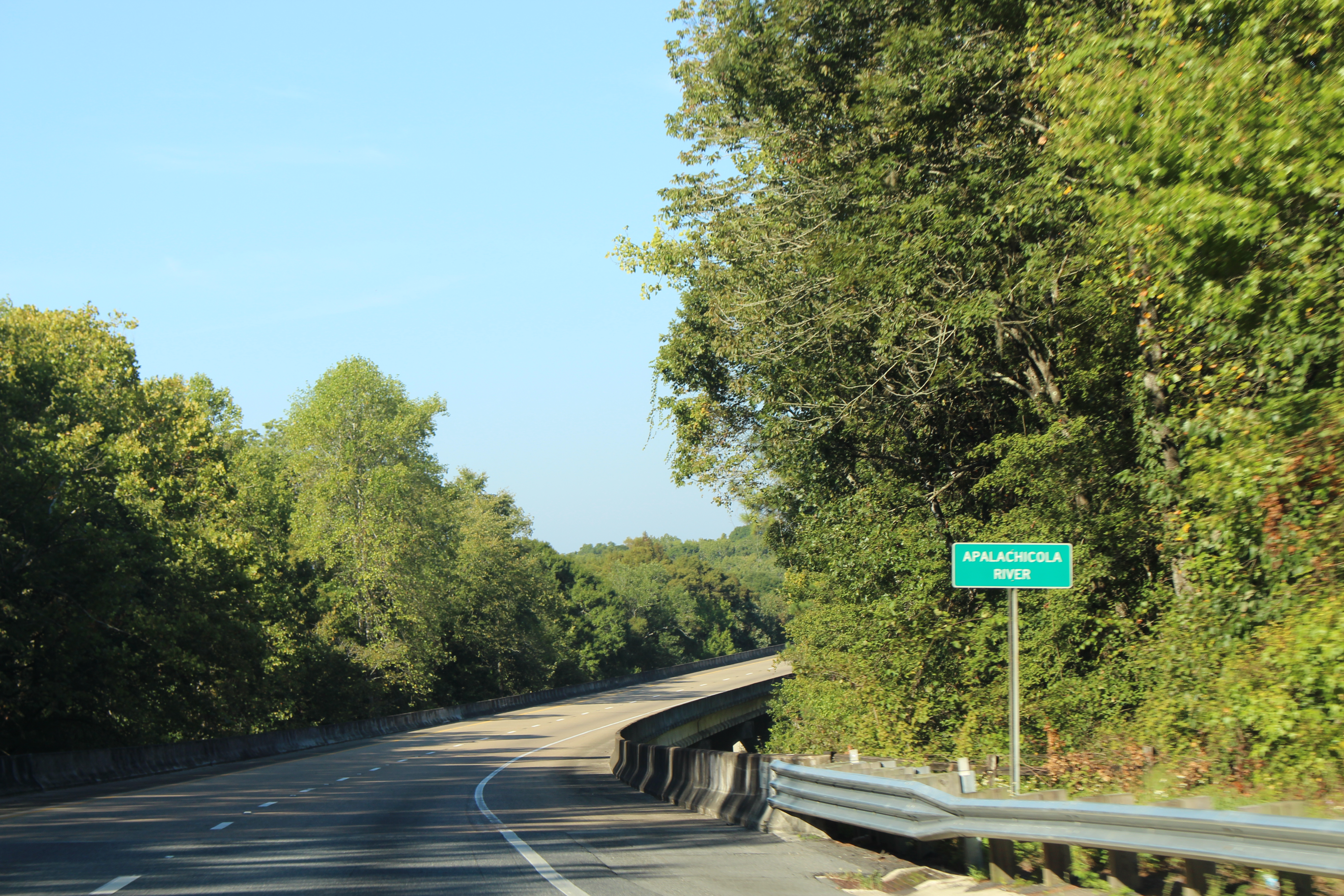
Interstate 10 WB crossing between Gadsden County and Jackson County

Crossing	Carries	Location	Coordinates
Jim Woodruff Dam		Chattahoochee
Victory Bridge	U.S. 90	Chattahoochee
Rail bridge	CSX Transportation	Chattahoochee
Dewey M. Johnson Bridge	Interstate Highway 10	Marianna to Quincy
Trammell Bridge	SR 20	Bristol
Rail bridge	Apalachicola Northern Railway	Apalachicola
John Gorrie Memorial Bridge	U.S. 98 U.S. 319	Apalachicola

== See also ==
- List of Florida rivers
- South Atlantic-Gulf Water Resource Region
- Voices of the Apalachicola
- Water wars in Florida
