= Voices of the Apalachicola =

2006 book by Faith Eidse

- Author: Faith Eidse
- Language: English
- Genre: Non-fiction
- Publisher: University Press of Florida
- Publication date: 2006
- Publication place: United States
- Pages: 352
- ISBN: 0813032121

Voices of the Apalachicola is a book by Faith Eidse chronicling the history of the Apalachicola River in Northern Florida, United States via oral histories. Its release of publication in 2006 coincided with increased awareness of the Florida-Georgia dispute over use of the river's resources, and the dying way of life of oyster fisherman in the Apalachicola River Basin, both of which were covered extensively by local press. The book contains oral histories of people who have worked and lived by the river, and builds a history of the culture and environment of the region, which is often regarded as one of the most endangered river systems in the United States. It won the 2007 Samuel Proctor Award.

Voices of the Apalachicola (ISBN 0813032121) was published by University Press of Florida and is 352 pages.
