= Little River (Miami) =

Neighborhood in Miami, Florida

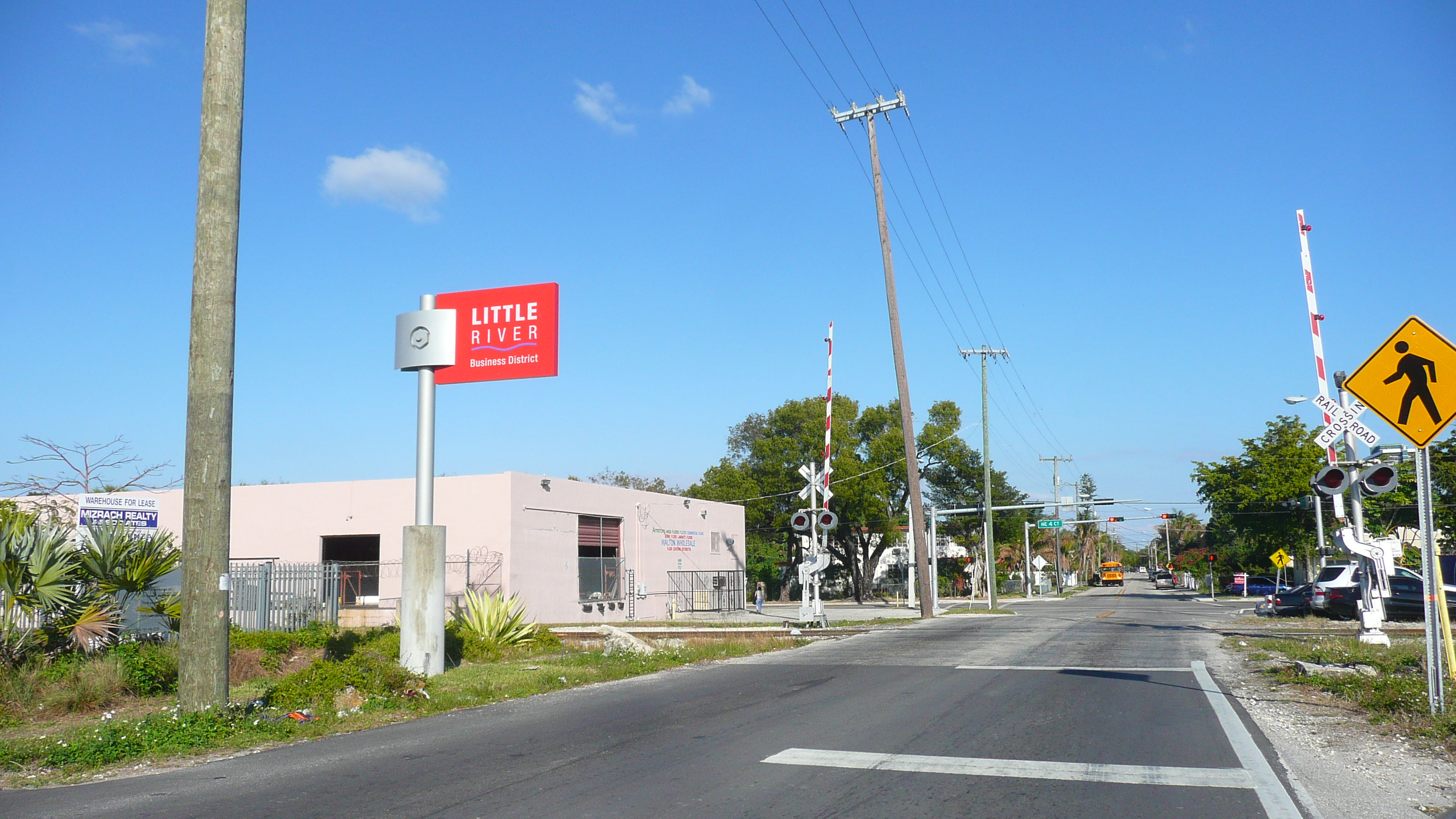
Little River Business District, February 16, 2011.

Little River is a neighborhood in Miami, Florida. The neighborhood takes its name from the Little River that runs along its northern edge, and which also forms part of the northern boundary of the City of Miami.

Little River was established in the late 1800s and was incorporated into the city of Miami in 1925. The neighborhood is bordered to the north by El Portal, to the south by Little Haiti (Lemon City), to the east by the Palm Grove Historic District, and to the west by West Little River. Its ZIP codes are 33138 and 33150.

== Places of interest ==
- Cathedral of St. Mary Originally formed in 1929 under the title "Little River Mission Club", the historic church is the only cathedral in Miami. St. Mary's serves as the "mother church" for the Archdiocese of Miami, led by Archbishop Thomas Wenski. A reflection of the multi-cultural nature of Little River, the church holds Mass in English, Spanish, and Haitian Creole) every Sunday, led by Father Christopher Marino.
- B&M Market A bodega selling home cooked West Indian cuisine. B&M Market has been featured on Anthony Bourdain's "Parts Unknown".
- McArthur Dairy A dairy processing and distribution plant founded in 1929 by James Neville McArthur.
- Little River Studios A popular photography and film production studio featuring 10,000 sq. ft of studios on an acre of open land.
- Little River Cooperative (formerly Little River Market Garden, est. 2010), is made up of two small farms and a plant nursery. LRC produces 40 varieties of annual vegetables and herbs as well as year-round tropical crops like sugarcane, bananas, key limes and edible flowers. The farm operates a CSA and installs/maintains edible gardens for schools, restaurants, and homes. Although not yet certified, LRC uses only organic and sustainable practices.
- Earth N Us Farm Founded in 1977 by Ray Chasser, is a 2-acre "urban eco-village", combining a farm, community-based residences and activities, and vegetarian culinary offerings.
