= Little River (Biscayne Bay) =

River in Miami, Florida, United States

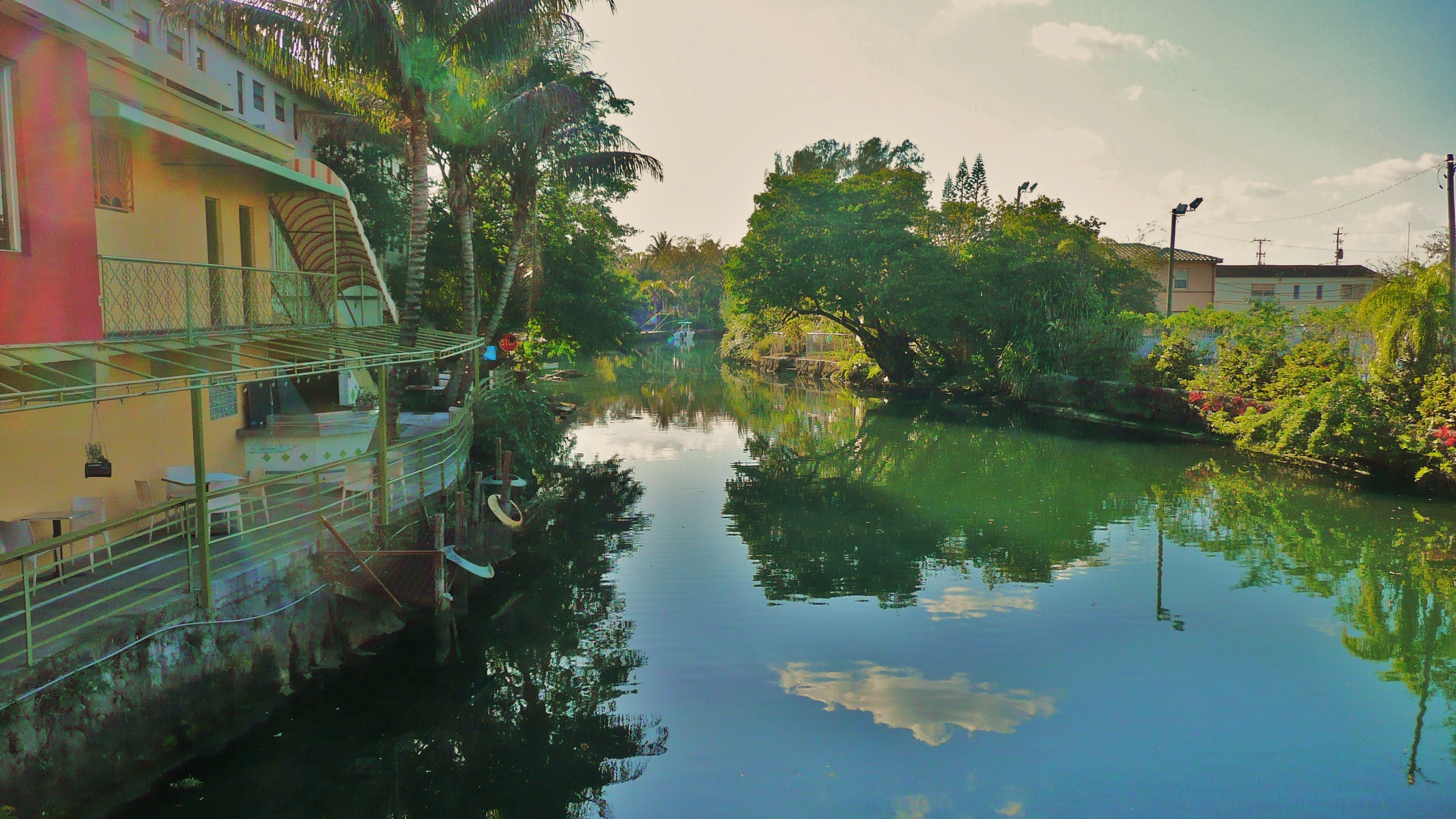
- Part of the northern boundary to the city of Miami, the Little River winds through Miami-Dade County from where it connects with the Miami River canal near Hialeah to where it empties into Biscayne Bay.

- Location of mouth

Location
- Country: United States
- State: Florida

Physical characteristics
- Mouth: Biscayne Bay
  - coordinates: 25.85096°N 80.19071°W

The Little River is a river passing through the northern part of Miami, Florida, United States. It empties into Biscayne Bay.

== History ==
The neighborhood of Little River was annexed by the city of Miami in 1925.

== See also ==
- List of rivers of Florida
- List of rivers of the Americas by coastline
