= Rice Creek (St. Johns River) =

Tributary of St. Johns River (Florida, US)

Location
- Country: United States
- State: Florida
- County: Putnam County

Physical characteristics
- Source: Rice Creek Swamp
  - location: east of Palatka, Florida
  - coordinates: 29.6813889°N 81.7494444°W
- Mouth
  - location: St. Johns River north of Palatka
  - coordinates: 29.6983016°N 81.6511946°W
- Length: 16.1 mi (25.9 km)
- Basin size: 31.1 square miles (81 km^{2})

Rice Creek is a stream in Putnam County, Florida in Florida, a tributary of the St. Johns River. It arises in the Rice Creek Swamp (also known as Nine Mile Swamp) west of Palatka in Putnam County, flowing north until it passes under Florida State Road 100, and then eastward, passing under U.S. Route 17 in Florida before reaching the St. Johns River. Much of Rice Creek Swamp is included in the Rice Creek Conservation Area established by the St. Johns River Water Management District. The major tributary of Rice Creek is Etonia Creek, which has a much larger watershed than does the remainder of Rice Creek. Etonia Creek joins Rice Creek about 2 miles (3.2 km) above Rice Creek's mouth on the St. Johns River. Rice Creek, excluding the area drained by Etonia Creek, has a watershed of 31.1 square miles (81 km^{2}). Little Rice Creek is a tributary of Rice Creek which also arises in Rice Creek Swamp. The creek flows primarily through wetlands and forests. Georgia-Pacific operates a pulp mill adjacent to the creek. The State of the River Report found Rice Creek's water quality measures for the 2016–2020 period to be within acceptable levels.
