= Shark River (Florida) =

River in the United States of America

Coordinates: 25.3534516°N 81.1170205°W

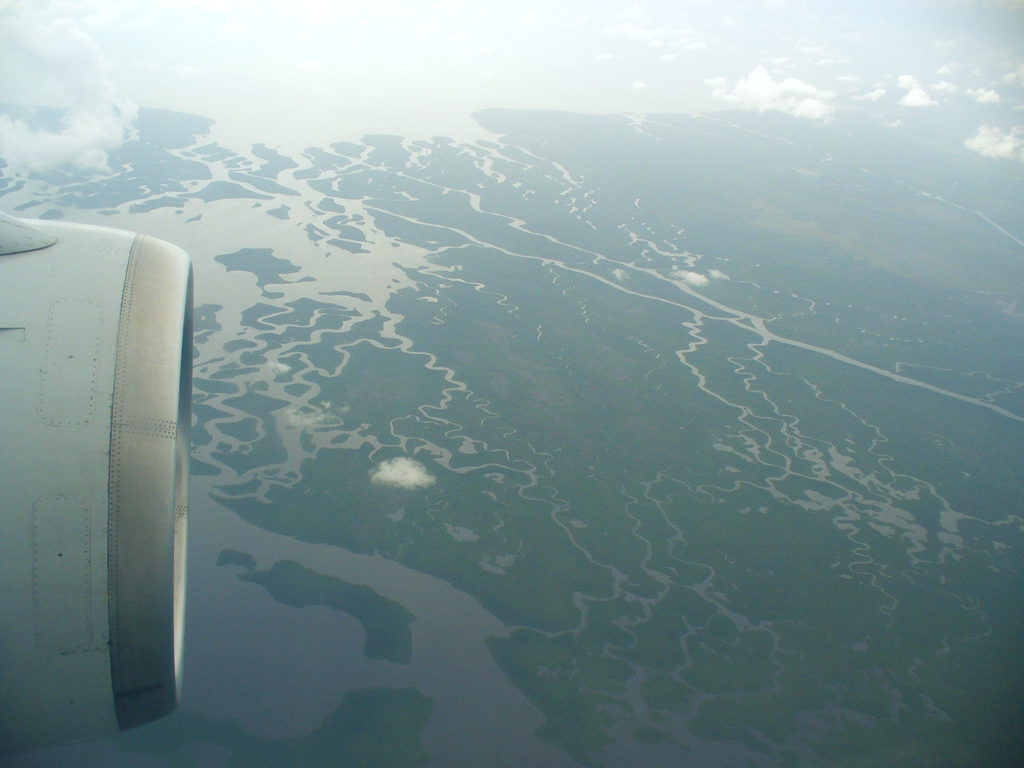
Aerial view of Shark River and Ponce de Leon Bay

The Shark River is a major distributary of Harney River in the southwestern portion of Everglades National Park. It is located in Monroe County, Florida, United States. The river is entirely sea level. The mouth of the river is at Ponce de Leon Bay, part of the Gulf of Mexico. The river is only 9.5 miles (15.3 km) long.
