= Orange River (Florida) =

River in United States of America

Coordinates: 26.694092°N 81.796231°W

Location
- Country: United States

Physical characteristics
- Mouth
  - location: Caloosahatchee River

The Orange River is a tributary of the Caloosahatchee River. Orange River is a 8.7 mile stream.
