= Lopez River =

Coordinates: 25.7872°N 81.3352°W

Lopez River is a river located near Chokoloskee, Florida. It is named after the pioneering Lopez family, who moved from Spain in 1873 to become one of the Everglades' first settling families. They later owned a cruise ship, the Star, that sailed the river and the other waterways of the Ten Thousand Islands.
