= Lostmans River =

Coordinates: 25°33′10″N 81°11′20″W

Lostmans River is a river located in Everglades National Park, Monroe County, Florida. It flows into the Gulf of Mexico. It is a part of the Ten Thousand Islands chain.
