= Little Withlacoochee River =

River in Central Florida, United States

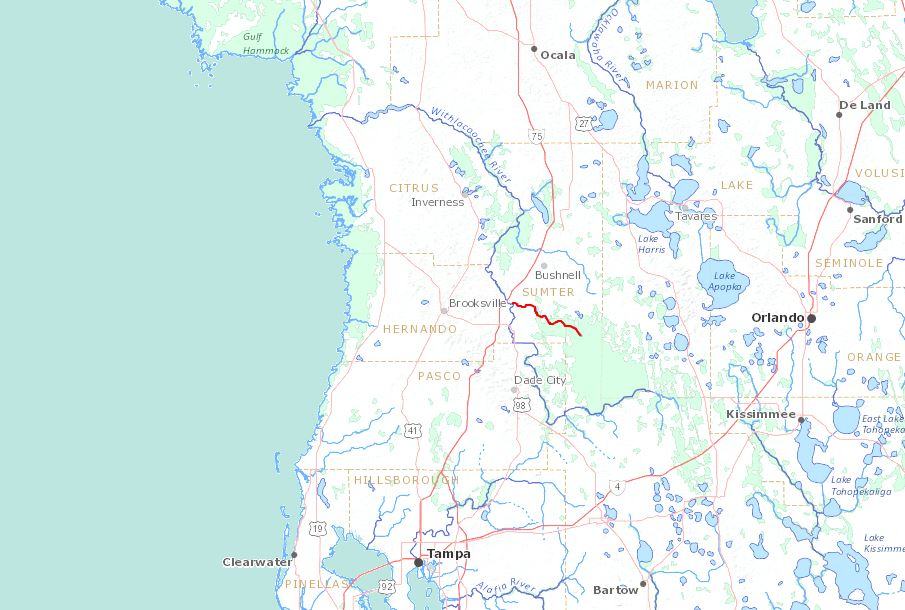
Course of the Little Withlacoochee River.

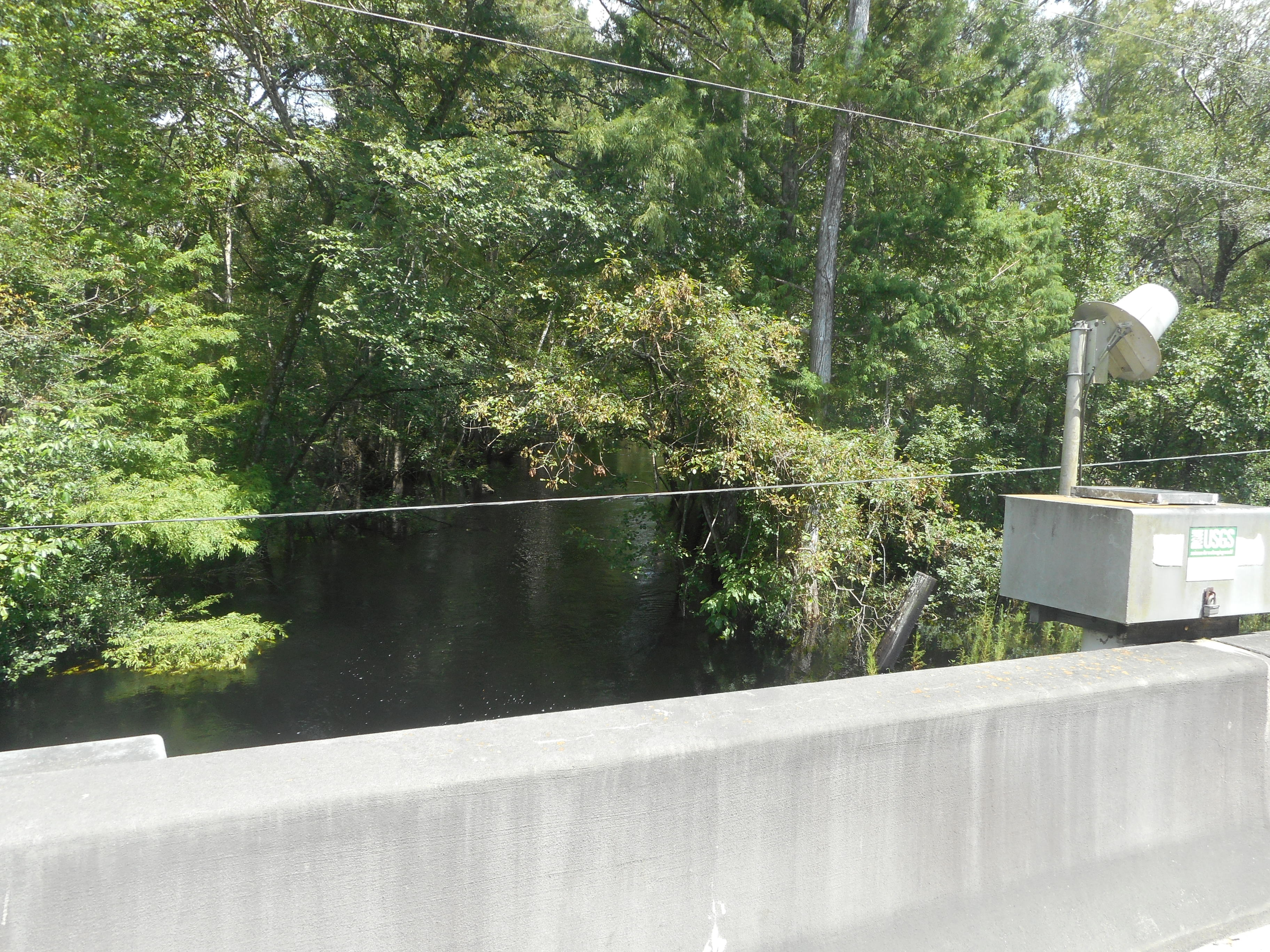
The Little Withlacoochee River as seen from US 301.

The Little Withlacoochee River is a 16-mile (26 kilometer) long river with its headwaters starting in the Richloam Wildlife Management Area in Sumter County, Florida. The Little Withlacoochee River ends near River Junction Campground just east of Silver Lake in the Croom Wildlife Management Area. It makes up a portion of the Hernando-Sumter County border. Its drainage basin covers 145 mi^{2} (376 km^{2}) of Hernando County and Sumter County.

== Course ==
The course of the Little Withlacoochee River flows through mostly wilderness, mainly Richloam Wilderness Management Area (WMA), one of seven tracts of the Withlacoochee State Forest. Richloam covers 58,000 acres of pine flatwoods and cypress swamps; over 4 counties: Hernando, Sumter, Pasco, and Lake. Richloam features fishing, hunting, and hiking trails. The exception is a small, undeveloped neighborhood near Ridge Manor. The river empties into the Withlacoochee River in Croom WMA, another tract of the Withlacoochee State Forest. Croom also covers 20,000 acres of pine flatwoods over Hernando and Sumter Counties, as well as Silver Lake. It features a combined 138 miles of biking, hiking, and horse trails.

== River crossings ==
Crossing	Carries	Location	Image	Coordinates
Headwaters (Richloam WMA)				28°29′41″N 82°00′35″W
180012	State Road 471	Hernando-Sumter Line		28°31′17″N 82°03′16″W
180071	State Road 50	Hernando-Sumter Line		28°31′29″N 82°05′48″W
080035	US Route 301	Ridge Manor		28°34′22″N 82°09′19″W
Mouth (Confluence with Withlacoochee River)				28°29′39″N 82°00′35″W
