= Ulmus americana var. floridana =

Scientific classification
- Kingdom: Plantae
- Clade: Tracheophytes
- Clade: Angiosperms
- Clade: Eudicots
- Clade: Rosids
- Order: Rosales
- Family: Ulmaceae
- Genus: Ulmus
- Species: U. americana
- Variety: U. a. var. floridana

Trinomial name
- Ulmus americana var. floridana (Chapm.) Little

Variety of flowering plant

Ulmus americana var. floridana, the Florida elm, first described as Ulmus floridana by Alvan Wentworth Chapman in the 1860s, is smaller than the type, and occurs naturally in north and central Florida south to Lake Okeechobee.

== Description ==
Vase-shaped, non-pendulous, growing to a maximum height of 22 metres (72 ft), with a slightly greater spread. The leaves, to 6 in long, are dark green all summer and turn yellow in autumn.

== Pests and diseases ==
The tree is no less susceptible to Dutch elm disease, although the disease is less prevalent in Florida.

== Cultivation ==
Occasionally planted as a shade and ornamental tree in Florida.

== Accessions ==
- The IRREC Garden, University of Florida. Accession details not available.
