= Little River (Ochlockonee River tributary) =

River in Florida, United States

Location
- Country: United States
- State: Florida
- County: Gadsden
- District: NWFWMD

Physical characteristics
- Source: Confluence of Attapulgus Creek and Willacoochee Creek
  - location: Freemont, Florida
  - coordinates: 30°36′48″N 84°29′09″W
- Mouth: Lake Talquin
  - location: Ebenezer, Florida
  - coordinates: 30°27′11″N 84°32′18″W
- Length: 14 mi (23 km)
- Basin size: 315 mi^{2} (820 km^{2})

The Little River is a minor river in the Florida Big Bend. A tributary of the Ochlockonee River, it is approximately 14 miles (23 km) in length and is located entirely within Gadsden County.

Forming at the confluence of Attapulgus Creek and Willacoochee Creek which drain part of southwestern Georgia, the river flows south through Gadsden County east of Quincy, draining part of the Red Hills before entering Lake Talquin State Park before reaching its terminus, flowing into Lake Talquin, a reservoir on the Ochlockonee River.

The river flows through Little River Conservation Area, a 2,119-acre (858 ha) tract purchased by the State of Florida using Florida Forever funds for the protection of wildlife habitat and floodplain forest along the middle river.

== Recreation and Wildlife ==
The Little River, although not a designated canoe trail, is often used by canoeists, especially on the lower river. The forests surrounding the river are also popular for hunting, while bream and pickerel provide fishing opportunities.

Birch, pine, red cedar and willows can be found lining the riverbanks, while damselflies, snapping turtles and other wildlife are also present.

== 1969 Flood ==
A tropical disturbance that moved inland from the Gulf of Mexico on 20 September 1969 produced heavy rainfalls, exceeding 20 inches (510 mm), over part of Gadsden County between the 20th and 23rd of that month, including 10.87 inches (276 mm) at Quincy during six hours on 21 September. On the Little River near Quincy, peak discharge on 22 September was 45,600 cu ft/s (1,290 m^{3}/s). Between 6 a.m. 21 September and 6 a.m. 22 September, the river level rose 21 feet (6.4 m), with the river's discharge exceeding that of a 50-year flood by a factor of 2.99, while at the US 90 bridge the westbound lanes were submerged under six inches (152 mm) of water.

== List of crossings ==
Crossing	Carries	Image	Location	Coordinates
Headwaters				30°36′48″N 84°29′09″W
500089	SR 12; Havana Highway		Littman	30°35′15″N 84°29′47″W
500018; 500063	US 90; Blue Star Highway		Quincy	30°33′13″N 84°30′52″W
500097; 500098	Interstate 10			30°31′44″N 84°31′00″W
rail bridge	CSX Transportation			30°31′38″N 84°31′02″W
500045	CR 268; High Bridge Road			30°30′44″N 84°31′24″W
Mouth at Ochlockonee River				30°27′11″N 84°32′18″W
