= New River (Pasco County, Florida) =

River near Wesley Chapel, FL

Coordinates: 28.1438°N 82.2499°W

Location
- Country: United States
- State: Florida
- County: Pasco County, Florida

New River is a river located in Pasco County, Florida. It is a tributary of the Hillsborough River (Florida). It is located near Wesley Chapel, Florida.
