= Cooper Creek (Florida) =

Tributary stream in Florida, US

Coordinates: 27°24′40″N 82°26′56″W

Cooper Creek is a tributary stream of the Braden River, in turn a tributary of the Manatee River, located in both Manatee County, Florida and Sarasota County, Florida.
