= Jackson River (Florida) =

Coordinates: 29.7236°N 84.9772°W

Jackson River is a river located in Gulf County, Florida. It is a tributary of the Apalachicola River.
