= Pinhook River =

The Pinhook River is a river located in the St. Marks National Wildlife Refuge in Jefferson County, Florida. It drains into Apalachee Bay.

== List of crossings ==
Crossing	Carries	Image	Location	Coordinates
Headwaters				30°13′45″N 84°01′36″W
				30°13′42″N 84°01′37″W
				30°12′48″N 84°01′53″W
	U.S. Route 98; Coastal Highway			30°11′16″N 84°01′42″W
				30°10′49″N 84°02′01″W
				30°10′33″N 84°01′48″W
				30°10′15″N 84°01′35″W
	Powerline service road			30°10′07″N 84°01′36″W
Florida National Scenic Trail	Tram Road			30°07′41″N 84°01′08″W
Mouth				30°05′58″N 84°00′53″W
