= Myakkahatchee Creek =

Stream in Florida, U.S.

Coordinates: 27°7′5.6″N 82°11′46.9″W

- Etymology: Mikasuki: Myakka-hatchee (the river of the big water - Myakka River)

Location
- Country: United States
- State: Florida
- Counties: Sarasota County

Physical characteristics
- Mouth: Myakka River

Basin features
- River system: Myakka River Watershed
- Landmarks: Myakkahatchee Creek Environmental Park

Myakkahatchee Creek is a small stream located near the city of North Port in Sarasota County, Florida. It is fed by Big Slough, and it is a tributary of the Myakka River. The stream supplies water to the city of North Port.

North Port Boulevard in the city of North Port runs parallel to the creek, and it was named Myakkahatchee Boulevard until 1975.
