= Hontoon Dead River =

Tributary of St. Johns River in Florida, US

Coordinates: 28.954832°N 81.357536°W

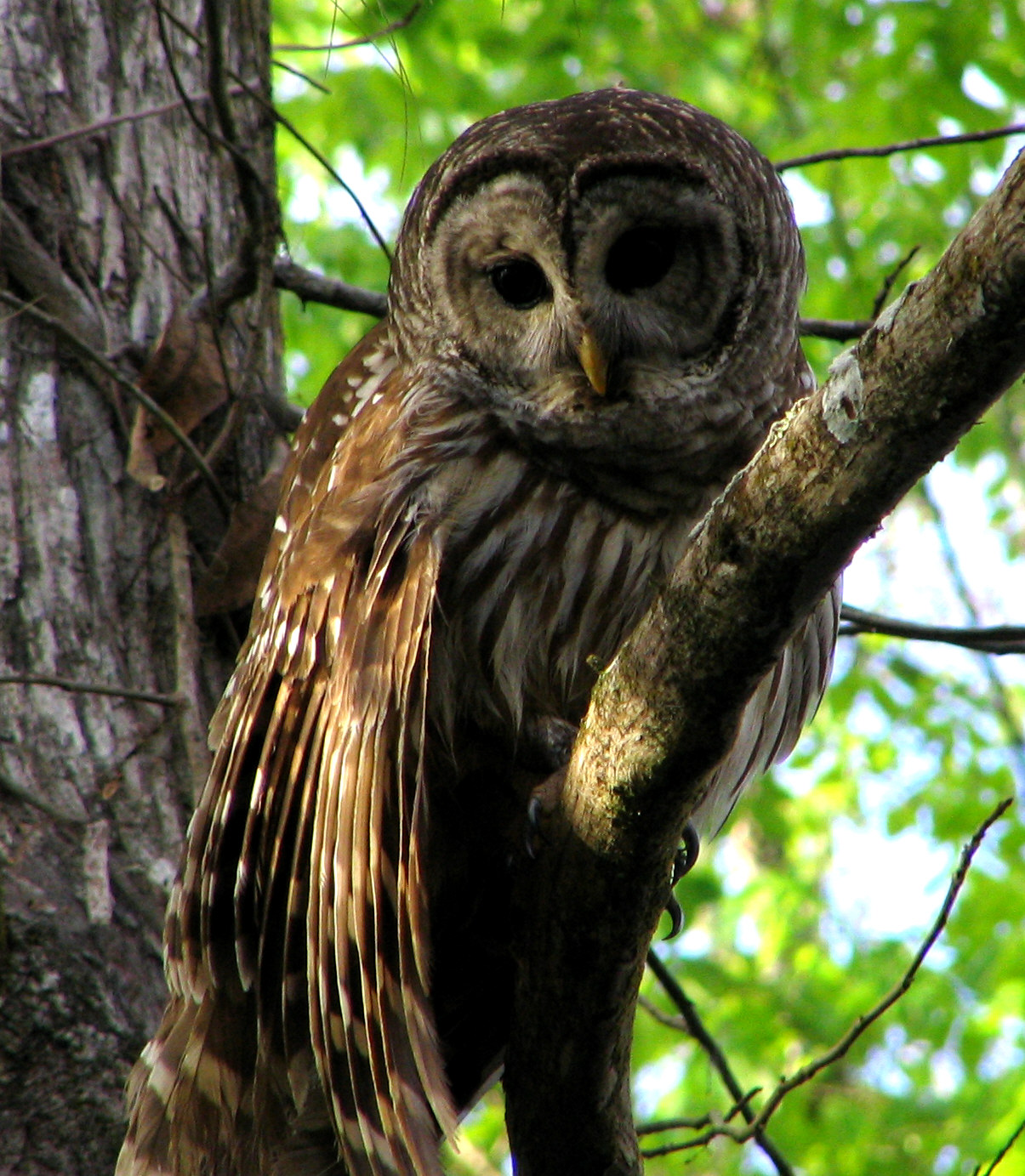
A barred owl on the Hontoon Dead.

The Hontoon Dead River is a tributary of the St. Johns River in Volusia County, Florida. Hontoon Island, home of Hontoon Island State Park is surrounded by the Hontoon, the St. Johns, and Snake Creek.

A "dead river" is one with virtually no current. The area is rich in wildlife, including manatees.
