= Etonia Creek =

Stream in northeastern Florida

Location
- Country: United States
- State: Florida
- County: Putnam County, Clay County

Physical characteristics
- Source: Blue Pond
  - location: near Keystone Heights, Florida
  - coordinates: 38.8108209°N 95.5494690°W
  - elevation: 52 metres (171 ft)
- Mouth
  - location: Juncture with Rice Creek 2 miles (3.2 km) west of St. Johns River
  - coordinates: 29.6919126°N 81.6806400°W
- Basin size: 230 mi^{2} (600 km^{2})

Etonia Creek, also known as Etoniah Creek, is a stream in Putnam and Clay counties in Florida. It is the major tributary of Rice Creek, which is a tributary of the St. Johns River. The upper or western part (150 square miles (390 km^{2})) of the stream's basin, the Upper Etonia Creek Basin, contains about 100 lakes. Many of those lakes do not have outflowing streams. On leaving its upper basin, Etonia Creek flows eastward, and then southeastward to its juncture with Rice Creek.

== Upper basin ==
The Upper Etonia Creek Basin (UECB) is a region of sand hills rising to 130 to 210 feet (40 to 64 m) above sea level. Small portions of the basin extend into Alachua and Bradford counties. The peaks of the hills are as much as 70 feet (21 m) above the lakes they adjoin. Blue Pond, in the northwest corner of the basin, is the highest of the lakes in the basin, at 174 feet (53 m) above sea level. Lake Grandin, at the southeast corner of the upper basin, is the lowest, at 81 feet (25 m). While the surface level of some lakes is relatively stable, other lakes have had surface levels vary by as much as 25 feet (7.6 m) over a period of three or four years. The surface level of Pebble Lake varied by 32 feet (9.8 m) between 1948 and 1956.

The underlying structure of the region is limestone with karst features providing underground connections between lakes and with the Floridian aquifer. The lakes in the UECB have formed in solution depressions in the limestone. Most of the lakes are small, with a surface area of less than 200 acres (81 ha). The highest lakes in the UECB, and the head of the Etonia Creek basin, form a chain. From Blue Pond, at an elevation of 170 feet (52 m), streams, some permanent and some intermittent, connect Sand Hill Lake, Magnolia Lake, Brooklyn Lake, Lake Keystone, Lake Geneva, Oldfield Pond, and Halfmoon Lake before reaching Putnam Prairie, also known as Wall Pond, 70 feet (21 m) above sea level. Putnam Prairie drains into Goodson Prairie, from which Etonia Creek arises. Another chain of lakes starts at Melrose Lake, draining through Lake Rowan, Lake Suggs, Twomile Pond, Ross Lake, Goose Lake and Ashley Prairie, joining the Blue Pond chain at Putnam Prairie,

== Lower basin ==
After leaving the upper basin north of Florahome, Etonia Creek flows eastward and then northeastward through Etoniah State Forest. Northeast of the state forest, Etonia Creek passes eastward through the Etoniah Creek Wildlife Management Area (WMA), where it is joined from the north by Falling Branch, which flows out of Georges Lake. While still in the WMA, the creek is next joined from the north by a tributary named Rice Creek (distinct from the Rice Creek that Etonia Creek joins near Palatka). Etonia Creek then flows southwestward until it is joined from the north by Simms Creek, about 2 miles (3.2 km) upstream from its juncture with Rice Creek (the tributary of the St. Johns River).
