= Harney River =

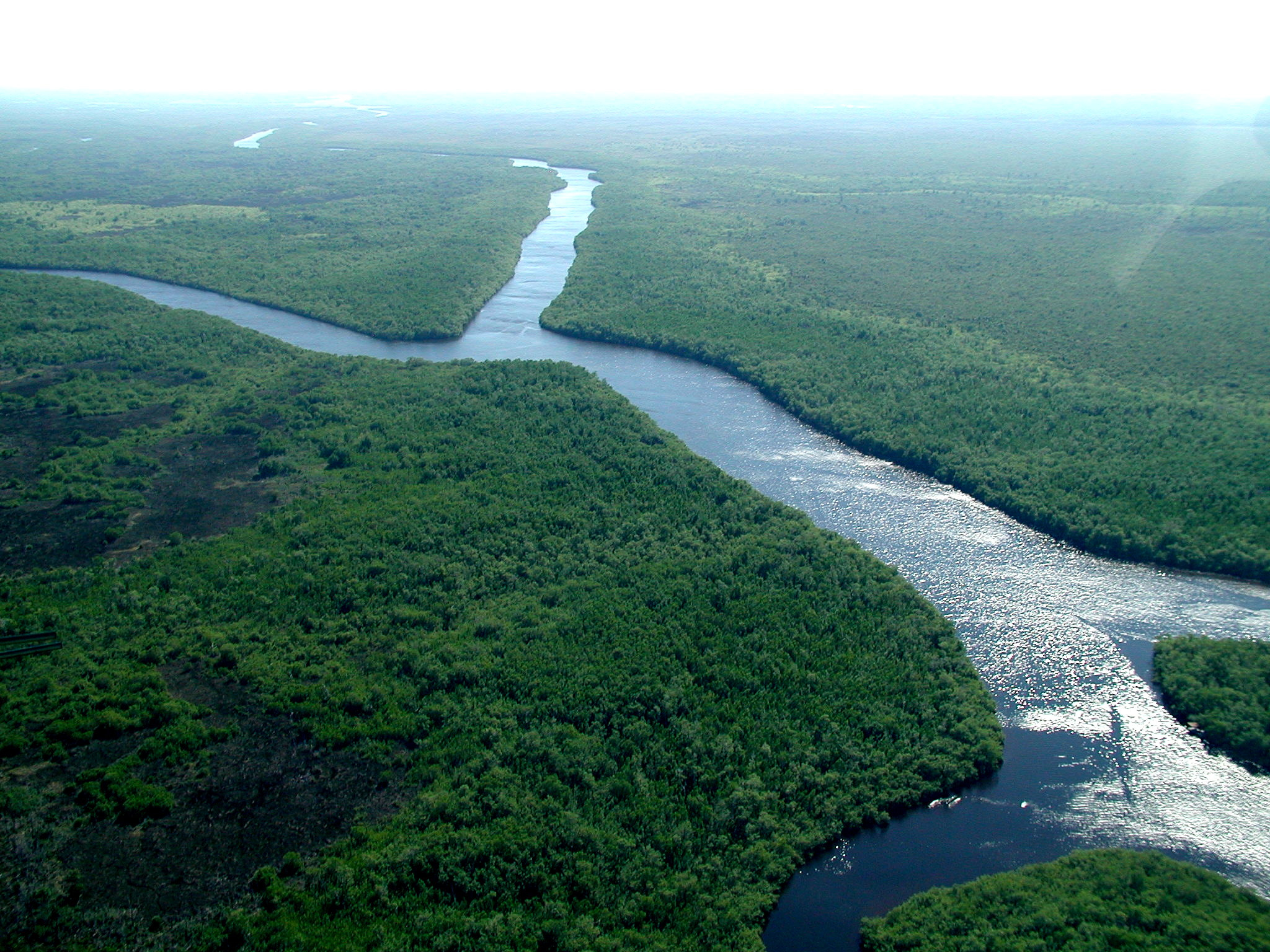
- Harney River in 2002

Location
- Country: United States of America
- State: Florida

Physical characteristics
- Mouth: Gulf of Mexico
  - coordinates: 25°24′39″N 81°08′46″W

The Harney River is a river in Monroe County, Florida. Harney River was named after Colonel William S. Harney. It is 10.19 miles (16.40 km) long.
