= Shoal River =

River located in Okaloosa County, Florida, U.S.

Coordinates: 30°41′09″N 86°38′53″W

Location
- Country: United States
- State: Florida

Shoal River is a river located primarily in Okaloosa County, Florida, near the city of Crestview. It is a tributary of the Yellow River, emptying into Pensacola Bay.
