= Tolomato River =

River in Florida, United States

Coordinates: 29°54′35″N 81°18′00″W

The Tolomato River is a river in St. Johns County, Florida situated southwest of Vilano Beach and north of St. Augustine. It extends northward and meets the St. Augustine inlet. During the British Period of Florida's history (1763–1783), the Tolomato River was known as the North River, and it is still referred to by that name by many locals today.

== Biodiversity ==
Tolomato River provides a natural habitat for a wide variety of plant, fish and animal species. Among the diverse species identified in the Tolomato River, some of them are designated as threatened or endangered. This includes the West Indian Manatee, loggerhead sea turtles, the Northern right whale and the large-flowered rosemary. Loggerhead sea turtles use the sandy beaches of the Tolomato estuarine system for nesting. Tolomato River also provides a natural habitat for the Manatees (large air-breathing aquatic mammals) due to its extensive cordgrass marshes. The Tolomato River estuaries are used by Manatees during their seasonal migration.

== Restoration efforts ==
Marsh restoration and living shoreline projects were undertaken by the SARP and ACFHP since 2012 to improve and enhance fish habitats, prevent shoreline erosion and provide opportunities for community involvement and stewardship to address the conservation goals. In 2012, Oyester reefs were constructed by the Guana Tolomato Matanzas National Estuarine Research Reserve (GTM Research Reserve) along the Tolomato river to prevent shoreline erosion and to attenuate wave energy from storms and wind.
