= Yellow River (Pensacola Bay) =

River in Alabama and Florida, U.S.

Yellow River Chester River
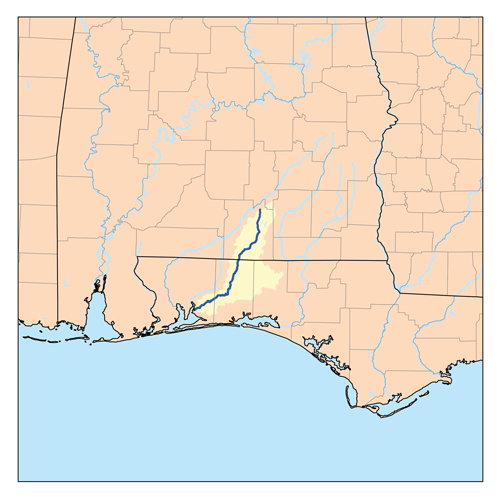
- Map of the Yellow River

Location
- Country: United States
- State: Alabama and Florida

Physical characteristics
- Source
  - location: Covington County, Alabama
  - coordinates: 31°27′24″N 86°20′05″W
- Mouth
  - location: Santa Rosa County, Florida
  - coordinates: 30°33′27″N 86°59′43″W
- Length: 118 miles (190 km)

The Yellow River (historically known as the Chester River or the Middle River) is a 118-mile-long (190 km) river in the southern United States which runs through Alabama and Florida. It empties into Blackwater Bay, an arm of Pensacola Bay. In 1773 Thomas Hutchins reported to the American Philosophical Society on the river.

54 miles of the Yellow River are part of the Yellow River Paddling Trail, managed by the Florida Department of Environmental Protection.

== See also ==
- List of rivers of Alabama
- List of rivers of Florida
