= Cincinnatia =

Conservation status
- Least Concern (IUCN 3.1)

- Secure (NatureServe)

Scientific classification
- Kingdom: Animalia
- Phylum: Mollusca
- Class: Gastropoda
- Subclass: Caenogastropoda
- Order: Littorinimorpha
- Family: Hydrobiidae
- Subfamily: Nymphophilinae
- Genus: Cincinnatia; Pilsbry, 1891
- Species: C. integra

Binomial name
- Cincinnatia integra (Say, 1821)

Synonyms
- Cincinnatia cincinnatiensis (Anthony, 1841)

Genus of gastropods

Cincinnatia is a genus of very small freshwater snails that have an operculum, aquatic gastropod molluscs in the family Hydrobiidae, the mud snails.

== Species ==
The genus Cincinnatia is currently monospecific, containing the single species Cincinnatia integra (Say, 1821).

Species brought into synonymy

In 2002, 15 out of the then 16 species of Cincinnatia were transferred to the genera Marstonia and Floridobia:

- Cincinnatia alexander Thompson, 2000: synonym of Floridobia alexander (Thompson, 2000)
- Cincinnatia comalensis (Pilsbry & Ferriss, 1906): synonym of Marstonia comalensis (Pilsbry & Ferriss, 1906)
- Cincinnatia floridana (Frauenfeld, 1863): synonym of Floridobia floridana (Frauenfeld, 1863)
- Cincinnatia fraterna Thompson, 1968: synonym of Floridobia fraterna (Thompson, 1968)
- Cincinnatia helicogyra Thompson, 1968: synonym of Floridobia helicogyra (Thompson, 1968)
- Cincinnatia leptospira Thompson, 2000: synonym of Floridobia leptospira (Thompson, 2000)
- Cincinnatia mica Thompson, 1968: synonym of Floridobia mica (Thompson, 1968)
- Cincinnatia monroensis (Dall, 1885): synonym of Floridobia monroensis (Dall, 1885)
- Cincinnatia parva Thompson, 1968: synonym of Floridobia parva (Thompson, 1968)
- Cincinnatia petrifons Thompson, 1968: synonym of Floridobia petrifons (Thompson, 1968)
- Cincinnatia ponderosa Thompson, 1968: synonym of Floridobia ponderosa (Thompson, 1968)
- Cincinnatia porteri Thompson, 2000: synonym of Floridobia porteri (Thompson, 2000)
- Cincinnatia vanhyningi (Vanatta, 1934): synonym of Floridobia vanhyningi (Vanatta, 1934)
- Cincinnatia wekiwae Thompson, 1968: synonym of Floridobia wekiwae (Thompson, 1968)
- Cincinnatia winkleyi (Pilsbry, 1912): synonym of Floridobia winkleyi (Pilsbry, 1912)
