= Wekiva =

Wekiva or Wekiwa may refer to:

- Wekiva, a synonym of the moth genus Peoria
- Wekiva River, a tributary of the St. Johns River in Florida
  - Little Wekiva River, a tributary of the Wekiva River
- Wekiva River (Waccasassa River tributary), in Florida
  - Wekiva Spring, on Wekiva River (Waccasassa River tributary)
- Wekiwa Springs, Florida, a community
- Wekiwa Springs State Park, Florida
- Wekiwa hydrobe (Aphaostracon monas), a freshwater snail
- Wekiwa siltsnail (Floridobia wekiwae), a freshwater snail

== See also ==
- Wakiva (disambiguation)
