= Wekiwa Springs =

Wekiwa Springs may refer to:

- Wekiwa Springs, Florida
- Wekiwa Springs State Park, in Florida

== See also ==
Wekiva (disambiguation)
