= Floridobia =

Scientific classification
- Kingdom: Animalia
- Phylum: Mollusca
- Class: Gastropoda
- Subclass: Caenogastropoda
- Order: Littorinimorpha
- Family: Hydrobiidae
- Genus: Floridobia; Thompson & Hershler, 2002

Type species
- Amnicola floridana Frauenfeld, 1863

Genus of gastropods

Floridobia is a genus of very small freshwater snails (and one species found in brackish coastal marshes) that have an operculum, in the family Hydrobiidae, the mud snails.

Floridobia siltsnails are dioecious (having separate male and female individuals). Females are usually much larger and more numerous than males. They are believed to have a life-span of about one year. In the relatively warm waters of Florida springs, reproduction occurs year-round. The snails feed on microbial organisms and detritus attached to surfaces. Floridobia species tolerate low dissolved oxygen levels found near spring vents, which helps protect then from most fish predators.

A study of F. floridana reported that the increased presence of cyanobacteria in its diet slowed its growth. Cyanobacteria blooms are becoming more common in Florida springs due to excess nitrogen entering the groundwater feeding springs, thus threatening the survival of siltsnails.

Species of Floridobia were classified in the genus Cincinnatia prior to 2002, based on the structure of the penis. Thompson and Hershler erected the new genus of Floridobia in 2002, moving 15 species from Cincinnatia, based on the structure of the penis and the female genitalia. A study of mitochondrial DNA in nymphophiline snails published in 2003 found that Floridobia formed a monophyletic clade, with F. winkleyi as a sister to the Florida Floridobia species.

== Species ==
Most of the known species in the genus are endemic to a single spring, a set of springs, or a spring run, in Florida. Species within the genus Floridobia include:

Species	Common name	Range
Floridobia alexander (F. G. Thompson 2000)	Alexander siltsnail	Alexander Springs, Florida
Floridobia floridana (Frauenfeld 1863)	hyacinth siltsnail	Northern peninsular Florida, Cumberland Island, Georgia
Floridobia fraterna (Thompson, 1968)	creek siltsnail	St Johns River drainage, Florida
Floridobia helicogyra (Thompson, 1968)	Crystal siltsnail	Hunter Spring, Florida
Floridobia leptospira (F. G. Thompson 2000)	flatwood siltsnail, Glen Branch siltsnail	Glen Branch, Lake County, Florida
Floridobia mica (Thompson, 1968)	Ichetucknee siltsnail, Coffee Spring siltsnail	Coffee Spring, Ichetucknee Springs State Park, Florida
Floridobia monroensis (Dall, 1885)	Enterprise siltsnail	Benson's Mineral Spring, in Enterprise, Florida
Floridobia parva (Thompson, 1968)	pygmy siltsnail	Blue Spring, Florida
Floridobia petrifons (Thompson, 1968)	Rock Springs siltsnail	Rock Springs, Florida
Floridobia ponderosa (Thompson, 1968)	ponderous siltsnail	Palm Spring, Sanlando Springs, Florida
Floridobia porterae (F. G. Thompson, 2000)	Green Cove springsnail	Green Cove Springs, Florida
Floridobia vanhyningi (Vanatta, 1934)	Seminole siltsnail	Seminole Springs, Florida
Floridobia wekiwae (Thompson, 1968)	Wekiwa siltsnail	Wekiwa Springs, Florida
Floridobia winkleyi (Pilsbry, 1912)	New England siltsnail	Coastal (brackish) marshs of Connecticut, Maine, and Massachusetts; Hudson River, New York

Two possible new Floridobia species have been identified, but have not been published and accepted as of 2023. Floridobia species A has been reported from the Ogeechee River in Georgia. The Waccamaw Floridobia has been reported from Lake Waccamaw, North Carolina.
