= Taurometopa =

Scientific classification
- Domain: Eukaryota
- Kingdom: Animalia
- Phylum: Arthropoda
- Class: Insecta
- Order: Lepidoptera
- Family: Crambidae
- Subfamily: Odontiinae
- Genus: Taurometopa; Meyrick, 1933

Genus of moths

Taurometopa is a genus of moths of the family Crambidae.

== Species ==
- Taurometopa aryrostrota (Hampson, 1917)
- Taurometopa haematographa (Hampson, 1917)
- Taurometopa phoenicozona (Hampson, 1917)
- Taurometopa pulverea (Hampson, 1917)
- Taurometopa pyrometalla Meyrick, 1933

== Former species ==
- Taurometopa calamistis (Hampson, 1917)
- Taurometopa inimicella (Zeller, 1872)
