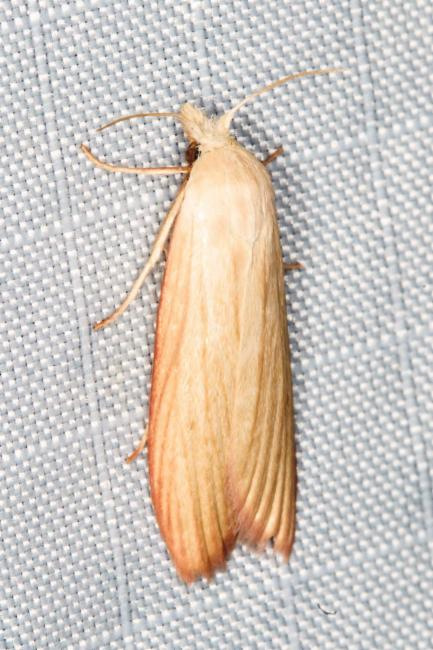
- Mampava rhodoneura

Scientific classification
- Kingdom: Animalia
- Phylum: Arthropoda
- Class: Insecta
- Order: Lepidoptera
- Family: Pyralidae
- Tribe: Tirathabini
- Genus: Mampava; Ragonot, 1888

Synonyms
- Anerastidia Hampson in Ragonot, 1901

= Mampava =

Genus of snout moths

Mampava is a genus of snout moths. It was described by Émile Louis Ragonot in 1888.

== Species ==
In alphabetical order:

- Mampava albivittella (Hampson, 1901)
- Mampava bipunctella Ragonot, 1888
- Mampava pulverea (Hampson, 1917)
- Mampava rhodoneura (Turner, 1905)
