= Central Florida (disambiguation) =

Central Florida is a region of the U.S. state of Florida.

Central Florida may also refer to:

- University of Central Florida in Orlando, Florida
- UCF Knights, that university's athletics program
- College of Central Florida, a state college in Ocala, Florida
- Central Florida Council
