= Rock Springs Run State Reserve =

State park in Florida, United States

- IUCN category V (protected landscape/seascape)
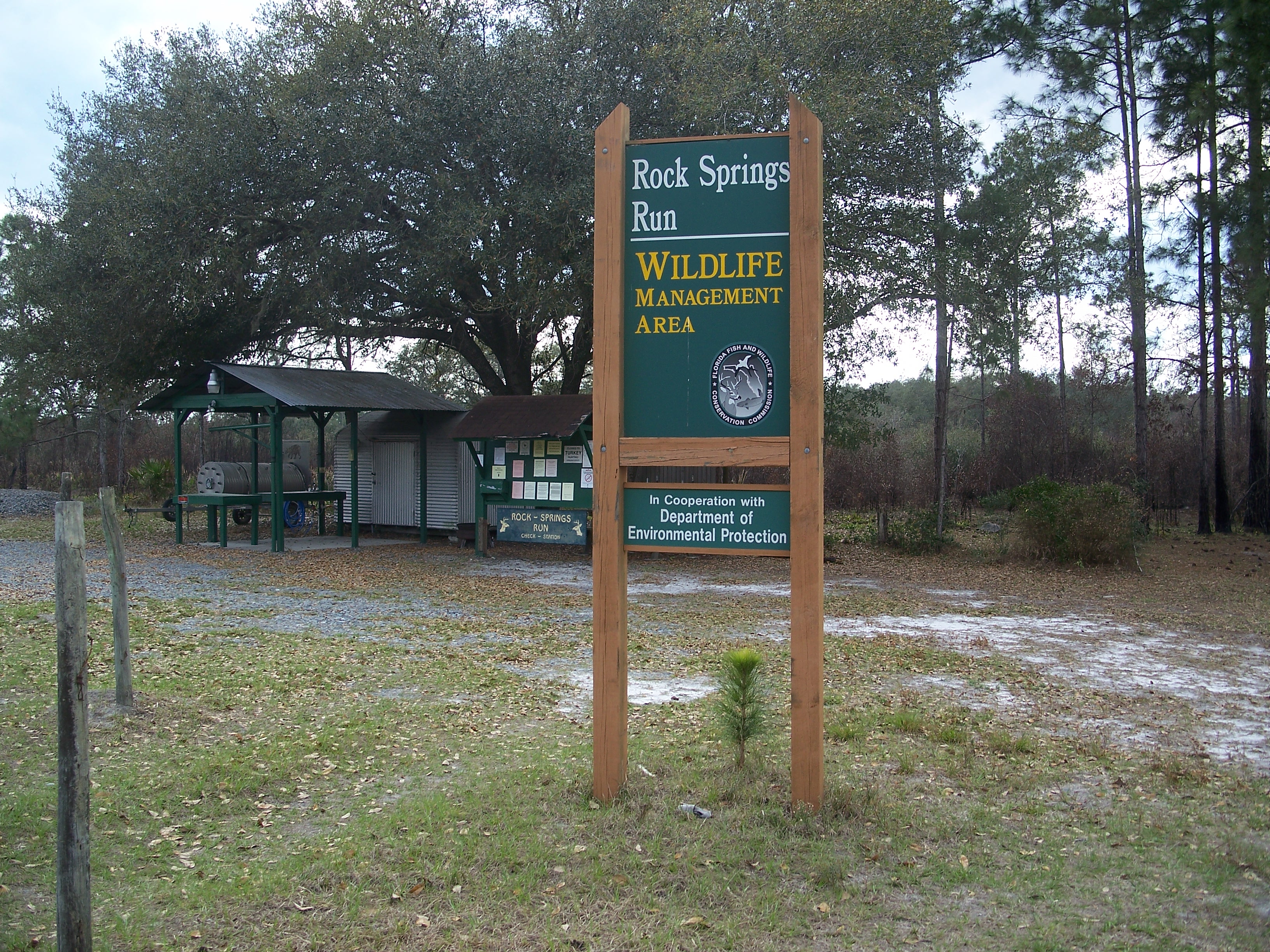
- Check station

- Location within Florida Location within the United States
- Interactive map of Rock Springs Run State Reserve
- Location: Lake County, Florida, USA
- Nearest city: Sorrento, Florida
- Coordinates: 28°42′54″N 81°27′00″W
- Area: 14,000 acres (5,700 ha)
- Governing body: Florida Department of Environmental Protection

Rock Springs Run State Reserve is a 14,000-acre (5,700 ha) State Park in the U.S. state of Florida. The main entrance is located about 30 miles (48 km) north of Orlando in Sorrento, 3 miles (4.8 km) west of the Wekiva River bridge on State Road 46 and extends into Orange and Seminole Counties to the south. The park contains a number of Indian mounds, pine flatwoods, swamps and artesian springs, and a number of creeks and rivers. Among them are Seminole Creek, Wekiwa Springs Run, Rock Springs Run, and the Wekiva River.

Activities include bicycling, hiking, canoeing, kayaking, horseback riding, hunting and wildlife viewing. Among the wildlife of the park are Florida black bear, Florida scrub jay, sandhill crane, indigo snake, gopher tortoise. Amenities include a canoe and kayak launch, rentals, swimming, tubing, about 17 miles (27 km) of trails, access to the Rock Springs Run and the Wekiva River, primitive canoe and equestrian camping facilities. The park is open from 8:00 a.m. till 6:00 p.m. year round.

== Designated Paddling Trail ==
Rock Springs Run is part of Florida's Wekiva River/Rock Springs Run Designated Paddling Trail. The 9 mile Rock Springs Run starts at Kings Landing in Apopka, runs through Rock Springs Run State Preserve, and meets the Wekiva River about a half mile downstream from Wekiwa Springs State Park.

== Ecology ==
Four rare snails are found in Rock Springs. The Rock Spring siltsnail (Floridobia petrifons) is endemic to Rock Springs. The goblin elimia (Elimia vanhyningiana) is found in one other spring in addition to Rock Springs. The armored siltsnail (Spilochlamys gravis) is found in two other springs in addition to Rock Springs. The hyacinth siltsnail (Floridobia floridana) is found in northern Florida and on Cumberland Island, Georgia.

== Gallery ==
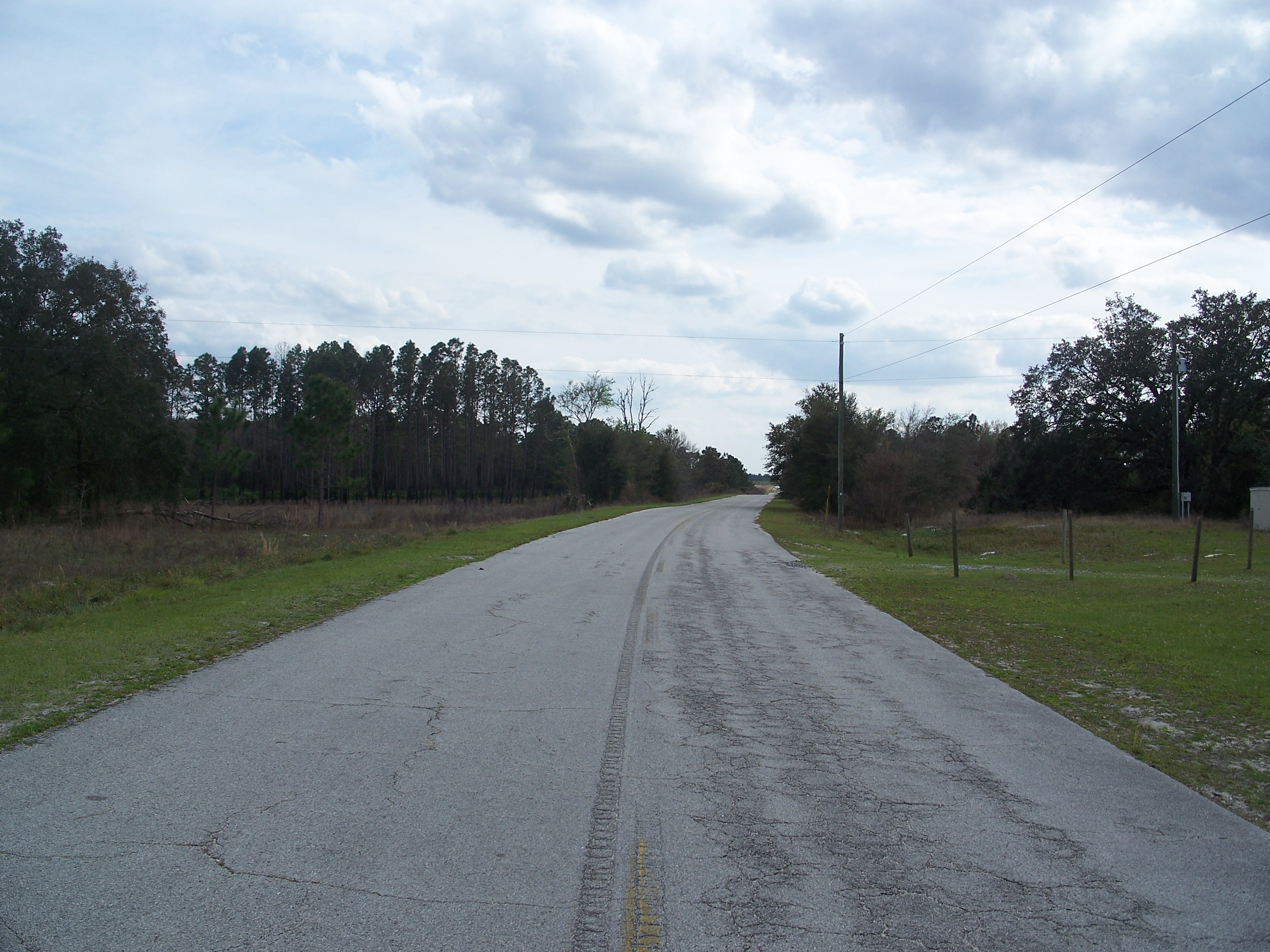
Main car road, looking south

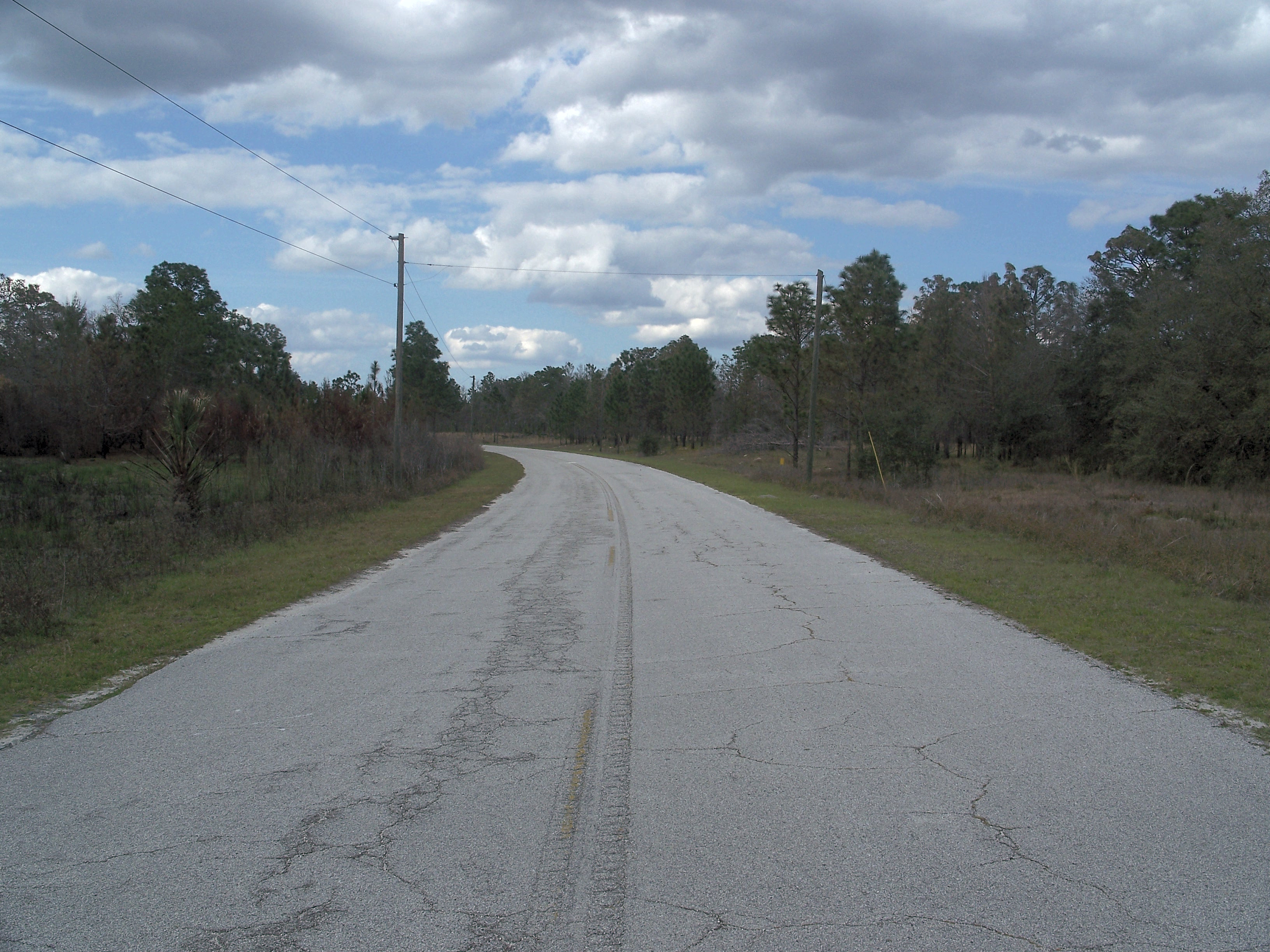
Main car road, looking north
