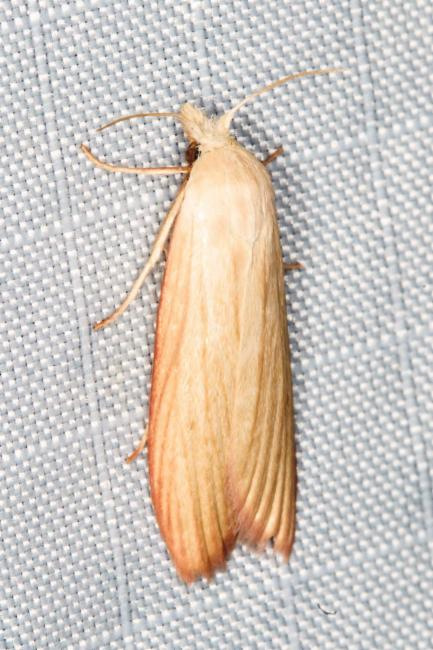

Scientific classification
- Kingdom: Animalia
- Phylum: Arthropoda
- Class: Insecta
- Order: Lepidoptera
- Family: Pyralidae
- Genus: Mampava
- Species: M. rhodoneura

Binomial name
- Mampava rhodoneura (Turner, 1905)

Synonyms
- Anerastria rhodoneura Turner, 1905

= Mampava rhodoneura =

Species of moth

Mampava rhodoneura, the buffel grass seed caterpillar, is a species of snout moth in the genus Mampava. It was described by Turner in 1905, and is known from Queensland in Australia.

The larvae feed on the seeds of Cenchrus pennisetiformis. They web together the heads of their host plant.
