= Wekiwa Springs, Florida =

Wekiwa Springs, Florida Wekiwa from Creek Indian
- CDP
- Location in Seminole County and the state of Florida
- Coordinates: 28°41′54″N 81°25′31″W
- Country: United States
- State: Florida
- County: Seminole

Area
  - Total: 9.13 sq mi (23.65 km^{2})
  - Land: 8.59 sq mi (22.24 km^{2})
  - Water: 0.54 sq mi (1.41 km^{2})
- Elevation: 49 ft (15 m)

Population (2020)
  - Total: 23,428
  - Density: 2,728/sq mi (1,053.3/km^{2})
- Time zone: UTC-5 (Eastern (EST))
  - Summer (DST): UTC-4 (EDT)
- FIPS code: 12-75725
- GNIS feature ID: 2402993

Wekiwa Springs is a census-designated place and an unincorporated area in Seminole County, Florida, United States. As of the 2020 census, Wekiwa Springs had a population of 23,428. It is part of the Orlando–Kissimmee–Sanford, Florida Metropolitan Statistical Area.

== Name ==
Wekiwa (Creek: Uekiwv) is the Creek-Seminole word for "a spring". The pronunciation of a soft-"w", sometimes perceived as a "v" or "b", resulted in cartographers mislabeling maps in later years. The maps drawn in 1838 and 1849 were spelled Wekiwa.

The springs that are associated with the name of the community are spelled Wekiwa Springs and the official census uses this spelling, however, most subdivisions and streets in Seminole County use Wekiva, a variant spelling that is shared by the Wekiva River. An incorrect popular belief is that "Wekiva", means "flowing water", with an authentic Creek-Seminole source, but that just was an alternate spelling used by developers that has fostered differences in spellings.

== Geography ==
According to the United States Census Bureau, the Census Designated Place (CDP) has a total area of 23.7 km^{2} (9.2 mi^{2}), of which 22.4 km^{2} (8.6 mi^{2}) is land and 1.3 km^{2} (0.5 mi^{2}) (5.68%) is water.

Wekiwa Springs is adjacent to Wekiwa Springs State Park.

== Demographics ==
Historical population
Census	Pop.	Note	%±
2000	23,169		—
2010	21,998		−5.1%
2020	23,428		6.5%
U.S. Decennial Census

=== 2020 census ===
As of the 2020 census, Wekiwa Springs had a population of 23,428. The median age was 44.6 years. 21.2% of residents were under the age of 18 and 21.6% of residents were 65 years of age or older. For every 100 females there were 89.9 males, and for every 100 females age 18 and over there were 86.7 males age 18 and over.

100.0% of residents lived in urban areas, while 0.0% lived in rural areas.

There were 9,227 households in Wekiwa Springs, of which 31.1% had children under the age of 18 living in them. Of all households, 57.3% were married-couple households, 11.9% were households with a male householder and no spouse or partner present, and 25.0% were households with a female householder and no spouse or partner present. About 22.2% of all households were made up of individuals and 12.1% had someone living alone who was 65 years of age or older.

There were 9,738 housing units, of which 5.2% were vacant. The homeowner vacancy rate was 1.8% and the rental vacancy rate was 7.5%.

Racial composition as of the 2020 census
Race	Number	Percent
White	18,170	77.6%
Black or African American	925	3.9%
American Indian and Alaska Native	41	0.2%
Asian	730	3.1%
Native Hawaiian and Other Pacific Islander	11	0.0%
Some other race	745	3.2%
Two or more races	2,806	12.0%
Hispanic or Latino (of any race)	3,418	14.6%

=== 2010 census ===
As of the census of 2010, there were 21,998 people, 8,677 households, and 6,379 families residing in the CDP.

=== 2000 census ===
In 2000, the population density was 1,035.4/km^{2} (2,681.2/mi^{2}). There were 9,413 housing units at an average density of 407.7/km^{2} (1,055.7/mi^{2}). The racial makeup of the CDP was 90.9% White, 2.7% African American, 0.1% Native American, 2.9% Asian, 0.0% Pacific Islander, 1.3% from other races, and 2.1% from two or more races. Hispanic or Latino of any race were 9.7% of the population.

In 2000, there were 8,825 households, out of which 36.4% had children under the age of 18 living with them, 66.8% were married couples living together, 7.5% had a female householder with no husband present, and 23.5% were non-families. 19.3% of all households were made up of individuals, and 6.5% had someone living alone who was 65 years of age or older. The average household size was 2.62 and the average family size was 3.02.

In 2000, the CDP the population was spread out, with 25.4% under the age of 18, 5.4% from 18 to 24, 25.8% from 25 to 44, 31.6% from 45 to 64, and 11.7% who were 65 years of age or older. The median age was 42 years. For every 100 females, there were 94.9 males. For every 100 females age 18 and over, there were 92.1 males.

The median income for a household in the CDP was $71,839, and the median income for a family was $78,495. Males had a median income of $61,713 versus $37,285 for females. The per capita income for the CDP was $36,196. About 1.6% of families and 2.6% of the population were below the poverty line, including 2.6% of those under age 18 and 1.0% of those age 65 or over.
