= Taurometopa phoenicozona =

Scientific classification
- Kingdom: Animalia
- Phylum: Arthropoda
- Class: Insecta
- Order: Lepidoptera
- Family: Crambidae
- Genus: Taurometopa
- Species: T. phoenicozona

Binomial name
- Taurometopa phoenicozona (Hampson, 1917)

Synonyms
- Balaenifrons phoenicozona Hampson, 1917

Species of moth

Taurometopa phoenicozona is a moth in the family Crambidae. It was described by George Hampson in 1917. It is found in Australia, where it has been recorded from Queensland.

The wingspan is about 16 mm. The forewings are golden yellow with deep red bands suffused with silver. The hindwings are semihyaline yellow, the terminal area suffused with brown.
