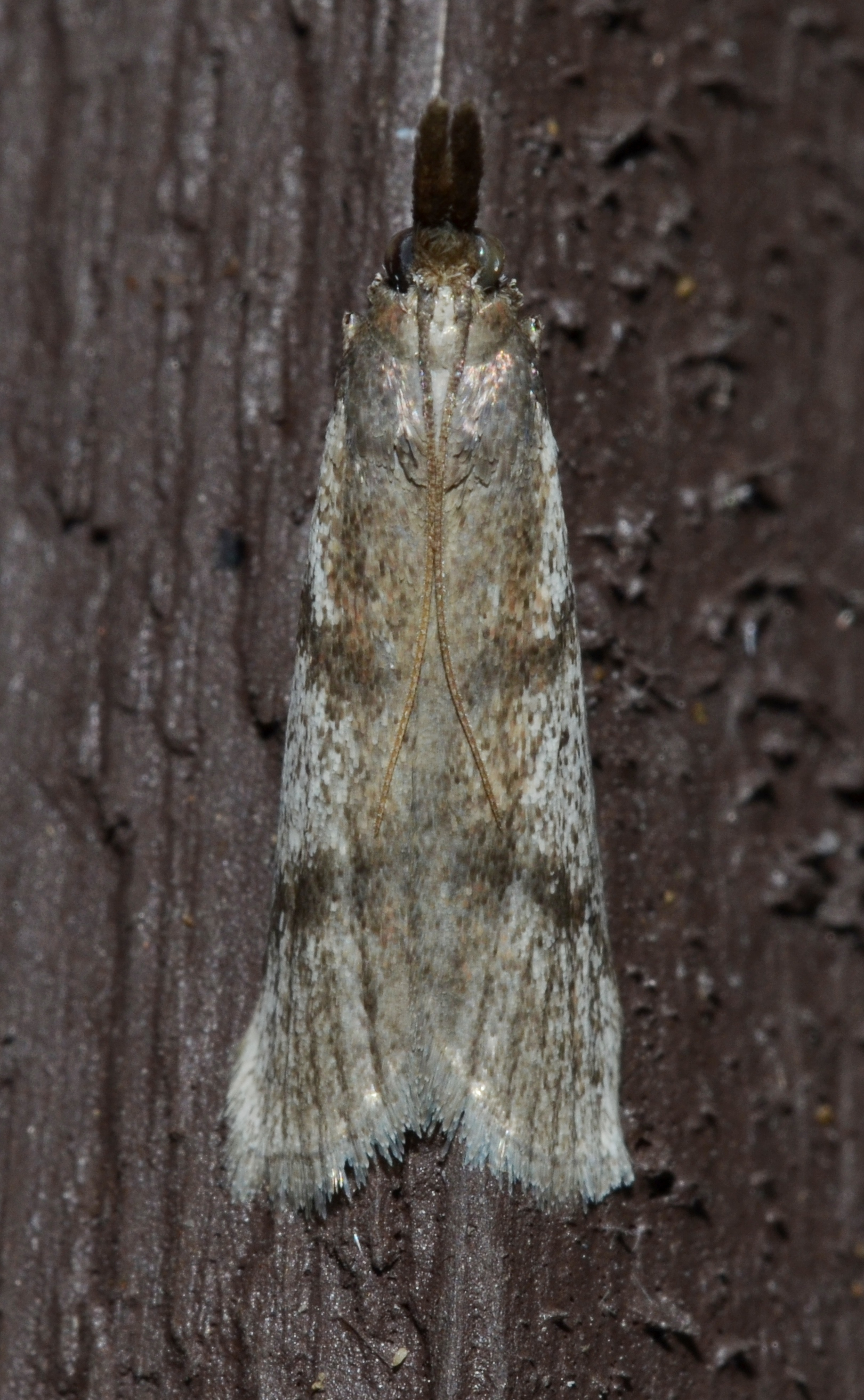

Scientific classification
- Domain: Eukaryota
- Kingdom: Animalia
- Phylum: Arthropoda
- Class: Insecta
- Order: Lepidoptera
- Family: Pyralidae
- Genus: Peoria
- Species: P. longipalpella

Binomial name
- Peoria longipalpella Ragonot, 1887

= Peoria longipalpella =

Species of moth

Peoria longipalpella, the long-palps peorium, is a species of pyralid moth in the family Pyralidae.

The MONA or Hodges number for Peoria longipalpella is 6042.

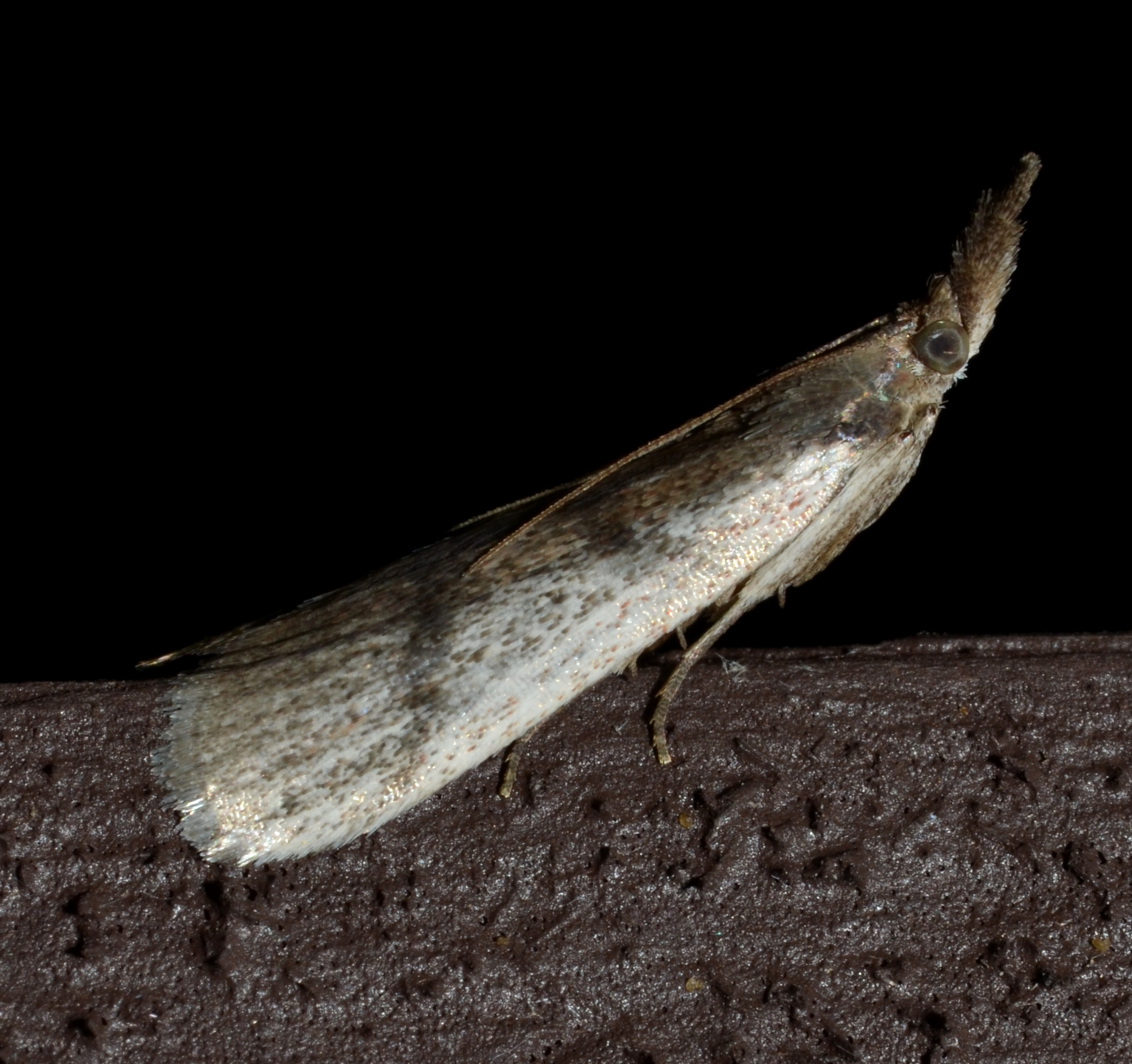
Long-palps peoria, Peoria longipalpella
