= Blackwater Creek (Lake County, Florida) =

River in Florida, United States

Coordinates: 28.861103°N 81.385957°W

Location
- Country: United States
- State: Florida

Blackwater Creek is an approximately 19 mile riverine feature in Florida. The creek flows from Lake Norris and has a confluence with the Wekiva River near where it in turn flows into the St. Johns River. The upper sections of Black Creek are traversed by kayak and canoe. Other sections a difficult to navigate due to snags.

The area was once inhabited by Timucua and Mayaca.
