= Paisley, Florida =

- Census-designated place
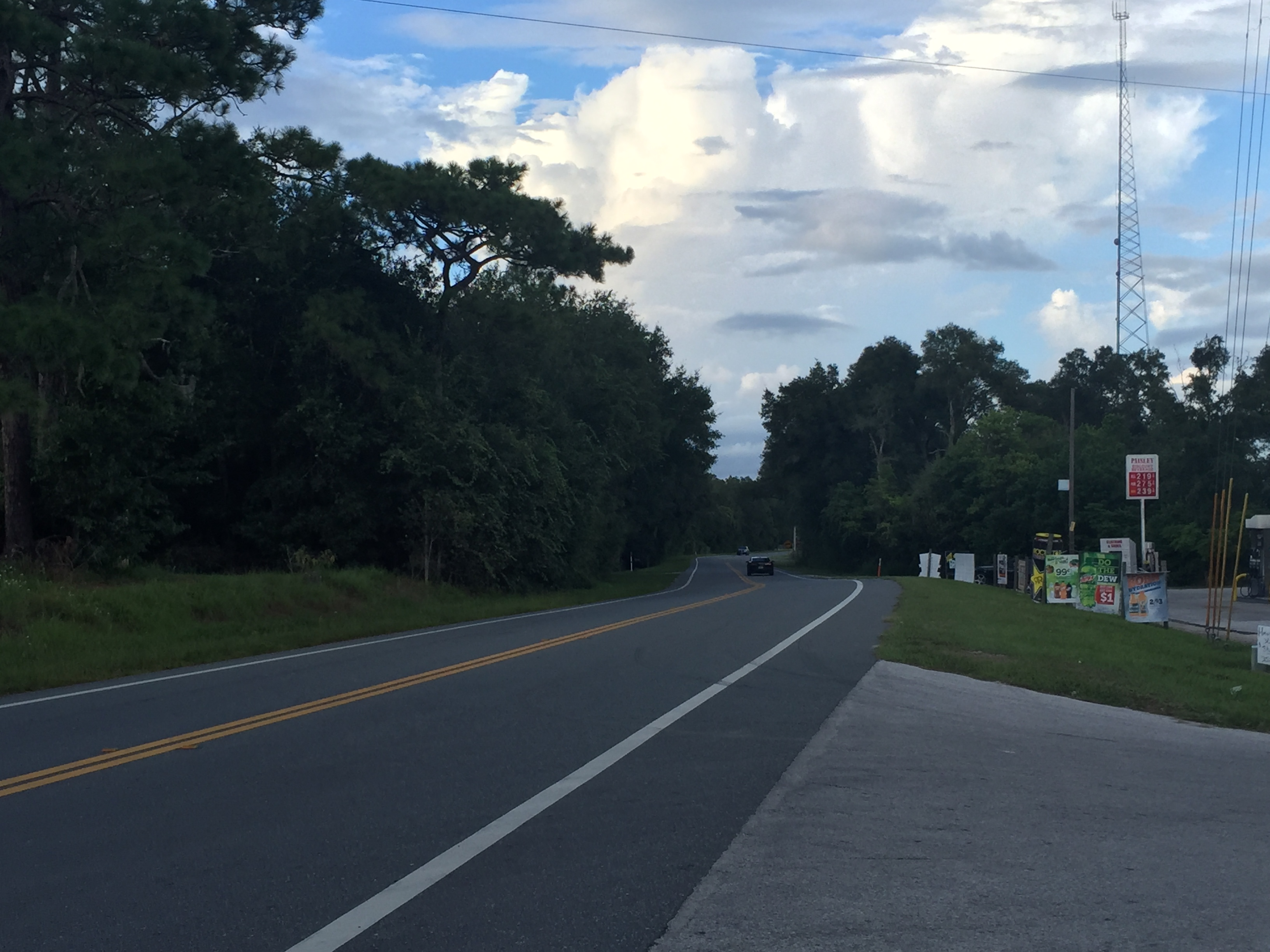
- County Road 42 in Paisley

- Location in Lake County and the state of Florida
- Coordinates: 28°59′06″N 81°32′26″W
- Country: United States
- State: Florida
- County: Lake

Area
  - Total: 3.36 sq mi (8.70 km^{2})
  - Land: 3.14 sq mi (8.12 km^{2})
  - Water: 0.22 sq mi (0.58 km^{2})
- Elevation: 75 ft (23 m)

Population (2020)
  - Total: 980
  - Density: 312.6/sq mi (120.69/km^{2})
- Time zone: UTC-5 (Eastern (EST))
  - Summer (DST): UTC-4 (EDT)
- ZIP code: 32767
- Area code: 352
- FIPS code: 12-53850
- GNIS feature ID: 2403387

Paisley is an unincorporated community and census-designated place (CDP) in Lake County, Florida, United States. As of the 2020 census, Paisley had a population of 980. It is part of the Orlando–Kissimmee Metropolitan Statistical Area.

Paisley is the closest community to Boy Scout Camp La-No-Che on the north shore of Lake Norris, and the community is also host to the Toronto Argonauts' pre-season training and free agency camp.

== History ==
A post office called Paisley has been in operation since 1886. The community was named after the town of Paisley in Scotland. Earlier names for the area include Acron and Lightwood.

On the morning of February 2, 2007, a tornado touched down in the community and was blamed for at least 14 deaths.

== Geography ==
Paisley is located in northern Lake County. It was in Orange County before Lake County's creation on 27 July 1887. The CDP includes the communities of Paisley, Johnsons Corner, and Blue Lakes Ridge. Paisley is on the southern edge of the Ocala National Forest and is 17 miles (27 km) northeast of Eustis and 16 miles (26 km) west of DeLand.

The main arteries of the town of Paisley are Lake County Road 42 and Maggie Jones Road.

According to the United States Census Bureau, the CDP has a total area of 3.4 square miles (8.7 km^{2}), of which 3.1 square miles (8.1 km^{2}) are land and 0.2 square miles (0.6 km^{2}), or 6.70%, are water. There are at least seven small named lakes within the community and several more unnamed ones.

== Demographics ==
Historical population
Census	Pop.	Note	%±
2020	980		—
U.S. Decennial Census

As of the census of 2000, there were 734 people, 317 households, and 217 families residing in the CDP. The population density was 223.7 inhabitants per square mile (86.4/km^{2}). There were 396 housing units at an average density of 120.7 per square mile (46.6/km^{2}). The racial makeup of the CDP was 97.41% White, 0.68% Native American, 0.54% Asian, 1.23% from other races, and 0.14% from two or more races. Hispanic or Latino of any race were 1.63% of the population.

There were 317 households, out of which 24.6% had children under the age of 18 living with them, 53.3% were married couples living together, 10.1% had a female householder with no husband present, and 31.5% were non-families. 24.0% of all households were made up of individuals, and 11.7% had someone living alone who was 65 years of age or older. The average household size was 2.32 and the average family size was 2.73.

In the CDP, the population was spread out, with 22.8% under the age of 18, 4.6% from 18 to 24, 25.9% from 25 to 44, 24.0% from 45 to 64, and 22.8% who were 65 years of age or older. The median age was 43 years. For every 100 females, there were 97.8 males. For every 100 females age 18 and over, there were 91.6 males.

The median income for a household in the CDP was $29,000, and the median income for a family was $38,500. Males had a median income of $29,732 versus $26,111 for females. The per capita income for the CDP was $12,798. About 14.0% of families and 17.4% of the population were below the poverty line, including 21.1% of those under age 18 and 15.8% of those age 65 or over.
