= Central Florida Council =

Scouting organization in Florida, USA

- Owner: Boy Scouts of America
- Headquarters: Apopka, Florida
- Country: United States
- Founded: 1922
- Scout Executive: Eric Magendantz
- Chair, Board of Directors: Jeff Jennings
- Council President: Bill Patterson
- Council Commissioner: Terry Wheeler
- Website www.cflscouting.org

The Central Florida Council serves youth in Orange, Osceola, Seminole, Lake, Brevard, Volusia and Flagler Counties in Florida. Its headquarters was previously located in Orlando, Florida and is currently located in Apopka, Florida, just north of Orlando. Its primary Scout camp is Camp La-No-Che in Paisley, Florida, adjacent to the Ocala National Forest.

In 1922, the Central Florida Council, Boy Scouts of America, was chartered by the National Council of the Boy Scouts of America to implement a quality Scouting program to all youth in its geographic area. The council is incorporated as a non-profit organization in the State of Florida.

== Organization ==
The council is broken down into seven geographical districts covering seven counties:

- Timuqua District
- Riverside District
- Challenger District
- Eagle Empire District
- Narcoossee District
- Lake District
- Seminole District

== Council Insignia ==
The current council insignia is worn on the left shoulder of Cub Scout (to include Webelos), Boy Scout and adult leader uniforms and replaces the while block lettering on a red field insignia that spelled out "CENTRAL FLORIDA COUNCIL" or the alternative white on red community and state strips indicating a unit's location that were worn from the 1930s to the mid-1970s. The current insignia depicts a launching Saturn V lunar rocket, given the presence of NASA's John F. Kennedy Space Center within the council's boundaries, a Scouting fleur-de-lis above a crescent moon against a blue Central Florida sky, followed by a stand of orange trees, given the citrus industry's significant presence in Central Florida.

The insignia was slightly modified in the late 1980s, temporarily replacing the Saturn V with a profile of a launching Space Shuttle before returning to the current rocket profile following the Space Shuttle's retirement.

== Camps ==
=== Camp La-No-Che ===
Camp La-No-Che is the Scouts BSA Camp located on the north shore of Lake Norris in Paisley, Florida. It is a part of Central Florida Council of Scouting America and is home to Tipisa Lodge of the Order of the Arrow (OA). Camp La-No-Che is part of the Leonard and Marjorie Williams Family Scout Reservation.

La-No-Che is 1,480 acres (6.0 km^{2}) and located near the southern border of the Ocala National Forest and on the shores of lake Norris. It is also on the north side of the Wekiva River Protection Area.

The camp is open year-round with its most active time being the 8 weeks during summer camp in June and July. La-No-Che also hosts weekends for local high school JROTC units, Venturing units, Learning for Life units, Cub Scouts, and Webelos weekends. Tipisa Lodge also hosts OA events including sectional weekends.

There are multiple sub-camp locations on the Leonard and Marjorie Williams Family Scout Reservation including Camp Rybolt — a large group camping area, Camp Pooh Bear — a secluded and primitive camp, and Adventure Camp, which has a Project COPE course.

The camp has two waterfront areas with docks, an aquatics program, a climbing wall, two swimming pools, laundry facilities, a trading post (camp store), shotgun, rifle, and archery ranges, a health lodge, outdoor chapel, a Order of the Arrow museum, dining hall, and multiple modern latrines. Also contained on the property is a water treatment plant, 5 residential houses, sulphur springs, Pooh Bear Lake, 25 Troop campsites, 2 Staff Bunkhouses, 8 staff cabins, a baseball field, amphitheater, basketball court, bouldering wall, a dance arbor, and the Florida Trail.

The W.T. Bland Dining Hall is a full-service food facility able to produce 3 meals a day for 1000+ campers.

Adventure treks and hiking trails are numerous including Big Stump, a 12' cypress stump and an Orlando area attraction trek, Eagle Week, SCUBA diving, climbing, caving, kayaking, sailing, and trail biking. American Red Cross Health & Safety Certifications are also offered.

==== History ====
Central Florida Council's summer camping was originally located at Camp WeWa off of Orange Blossom Trail (US Hwy 441) in Apopka, Florida. Due to limited available land for expansion, close proximity to a highway, and a polluted lake on property, the Central Florida Council decided to seek new property around 1949. The Committee to find new land suitable for a summer camp was headed by Judge Don Cheney, an Orange County judge and long time Scouting supporter who was the first president of the Central Florida Council when it was organized in the 1920s. Through various means they investigated the Gould Hunting Lodge on the north shore of Lake Norris in Lake County, FL. The hunting lodge was owned by the wealthy Gould family from Massachusetts, owners of the Gould Pump Company. The former Camp WeWa was sold to the YMCA of Central Florida, who then sold it to the City of Apopka in 2021.

The first summer camp held on the new property was in 1950. During 1950 and 1951 there was no public electrical hook up onto the camp, although there was an electrical generator used for lights and a well-water pump. Ice blocks were brought in along with butane and propane for cooking and hot water purposes. In 1952, a 5000 Watt generator was purchased due to plans for an on-site refrigerator unit.

A few years later on the west end of the property land was purchased from the Dyke family, who was given continued access. Their house still exists today. The purchased land included the Sulfur Springs and the Big Stump nature areas, as well as a creek that feeds into Lake Norris.

The camp name was given by Judge Don Cheney and consists of "La" for Lake, "No" for Norris and "Chee" to give it an Indian sounding ending. According to Tom Burgess a professional Scouter of that era, "Cheney absolutely insisted that the name be La-No-Che... one "e", and even in the face of the fact that "La Noche" translates "the night" in Spanish...behind his back everyone understood that it was his way of putting the name of "Cheney" on the camp in perpetuity!"

In the late 1960s and early 1970s, the council maintained two additional camps in northwestern Seminole County on the east and west sides of Markham Woods Road, Camp Howard and Camp Wilderness, respectively. Camp Howard was originally established in 1946, during the period of racial segregation, as a camp for black Boy Scouts in Central Florida. Fully racially integrated by the early 1960s, Camp Howard contained a large lake for watersports activities and a limited number of other structures and facilities, albeit to a much lesser degree than Camp La-No-Che, while Camp Wilderness was an austere and essentially undeveloped facility for advanced scout camping by older Boy Scouts and Explorers. Given the costs of maintaining these additional facilities and the increasing value of the land for residential development, the council decommissioned both camps and sold both properties in the early 1970s. The site of Camp Howard became part of the current community of Heathrow, while the Camp Wilderness site became part of the adjacent community of Alaqua. Sales of both properties permitted the council to devote greater resources to the expansion and enhancement of Camp La-No-Che.

In the mid-1990s, the Florida-based supermarket chain, Winn-Dixie, donated a large sum of money to the Central Florida Council, and the camp was given the overall title of "Winn-Dixie Scout Reservation." In 2007, the Winn-Dixie name expired, and the Scout Reservation later sold naming rights to the Leonard and Marjorie Williams family.

== Order of the Arrow ==
Tipisa Lodge
- Founded: January 1, 1946
- Lodge Chief: Benton Forrester
- Lodge Adviser: Paul Lackie
- Lodge Staff Adviser: Michael Green
- Website http://www.tipisa.org

Tipisa Lodge #326 is a Lodge of the Order of the Arrow associated with Central Florida Council. It is descended from the Tipisa Honor Camper Society, and is the only lodge of that organization to retain the Tipisa name. Tipisa weekends are always held at Camp La-No-Che. It is part of Section 5, Eastern Region. As of 2013, membership in Tipisa Lodge numbered more than 1,400 Scouts and Scouters.

The Lodge was formed as an extension of the "Tipisa Honor Camper Society" in 1938. The society, which was originally created in 1930, also had chapters in Boy Scout councils in Michigan and Indiana. The Indiana chapter was chartered as an OA Lodge under the name "Me-she-kin-no-quah #269" in 1944, and the Michigan chapter was chartered as "Tecumseh #332" in 1946. The Central Florida chapter retained the Tipisa name, and was also chartered as an OA Lodge in 1946. "Tipisa" is from the Sioux language, meaning "red tipi".

Tipisa hosts 4 events annually, including: Spring Conclave in March, OA Service Weekend in May, the Lodge Leadership Development (LLD) and Banquet in August at Center Pointe Community Church, and Fall Fellowship in September. It also hosts FLOW (Florida Origins Weekend, formerly known as TNAW or Tipisa Native American Weekend) in February. The chapters of the lodge host their own Ordeal weekends (with most chapters holding joint weekends) in January and "make-up" Ordeals during Service Weekend in May.

Tipisa Lodge is divided into seven chapters, each representing an individual district of the Central Florida Council and led by a Chapter Chief with the assistance of several lodge officers and a Chapter Adviser.

Tipisa Lodge Chapters
District	Chapter
Seminole	Huracan
Challenger	Kikape
Eagle Empire	Lemhee-Yekchi
Timiqua	Micco-Tomokee
Riverside	Nefketeh
Narcoossee	Oussauna
Lake	Wewahitchka

== See also ==
- Scouting in Florida
- Boy Scouts of America
