= Taurometopa haematographa =

Scientific classification
- Kingdom: Animalia
- Phylum: Arthropoda
- Class: Insecta
- Order: Lepidoptera
- Family: Crambidae
- Genus: Taurometopa
- Species: T. haematographa

Binomial name
- Taurometopa haematographa (Hampson, 1917)

Synonyms
- Balaenifrons haematographa Hampson, 1917

Species of moth

Taurometopa haematographa is a moth in the family Crambidae. It was described by George Hampson in 1917. It is found on the Solomon Islands.

The wingspan is about 22 mm for males and 28 mm for females. The forewings are golden yellow with five ill-defined waved crimson lines with black marks suffused with silvery scales. The hindwings are semihyaline ochreous, the terminal area suffused with brown and with a publish crimson patch.
