= Mampava bipunctella =

Scientific classification
- Kingdom: Animalia
- Phylum: Arthropoda
- Class: Insecta
- Order: Lepidoptera
- Family: Pyralidae
- Genus: Mampava
- Species: M. bipunctella

Binomial name
- Mampava bipunctella Ragonot, 1888

Synonyms
- Anerastidia stramineipennis Strand, 1918; Anerastidia albivittella Hampson in Ragonot, 1901; Hypsotropha bipunctella Wileman, 1911; Rhinaphe dissocentra Meyrick, 1933

Species of moth

Mampava bipunctella, the foxtail millet webworm, is a species of snout moth, and the type species in the genus Mampava. It was described by Émile Louis Ragonot in 1888, and is known from India, Papua New Guinea, Malaysia (Sarawak), Taiwan, China, the Moluccas, Indonesia (Java, Borneo) and Japan.

The larvae feed on sorghum and corn.
