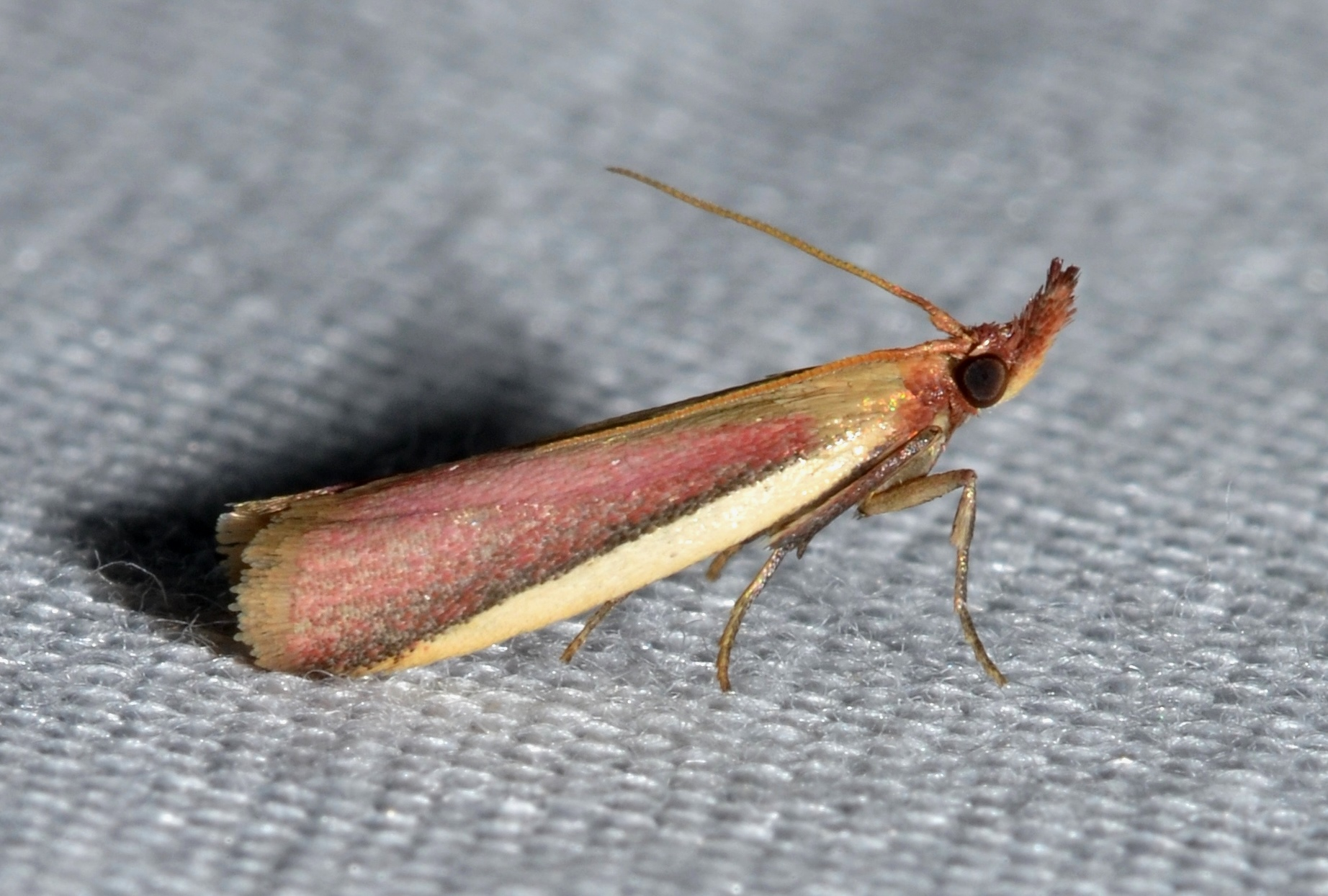

Scientific classification
- Domain: Eukaryota
- Kingdom: Animalia
- Phylum: Arthropoda
- Class: Insecta
- Order: Lepidoptera
- Family: Pyralidae
- Genus: Peoria
- Species: P. approximella

Binomial name
- Peoria approximella (Walker, 1866)

= Peoria approximella =

Species of moth

Peoria approximella, the carmine snout moth, is a species of pyralid moth in the family Pyralidae.

The MONA or Hodges number for Peoria approximella is 6053.

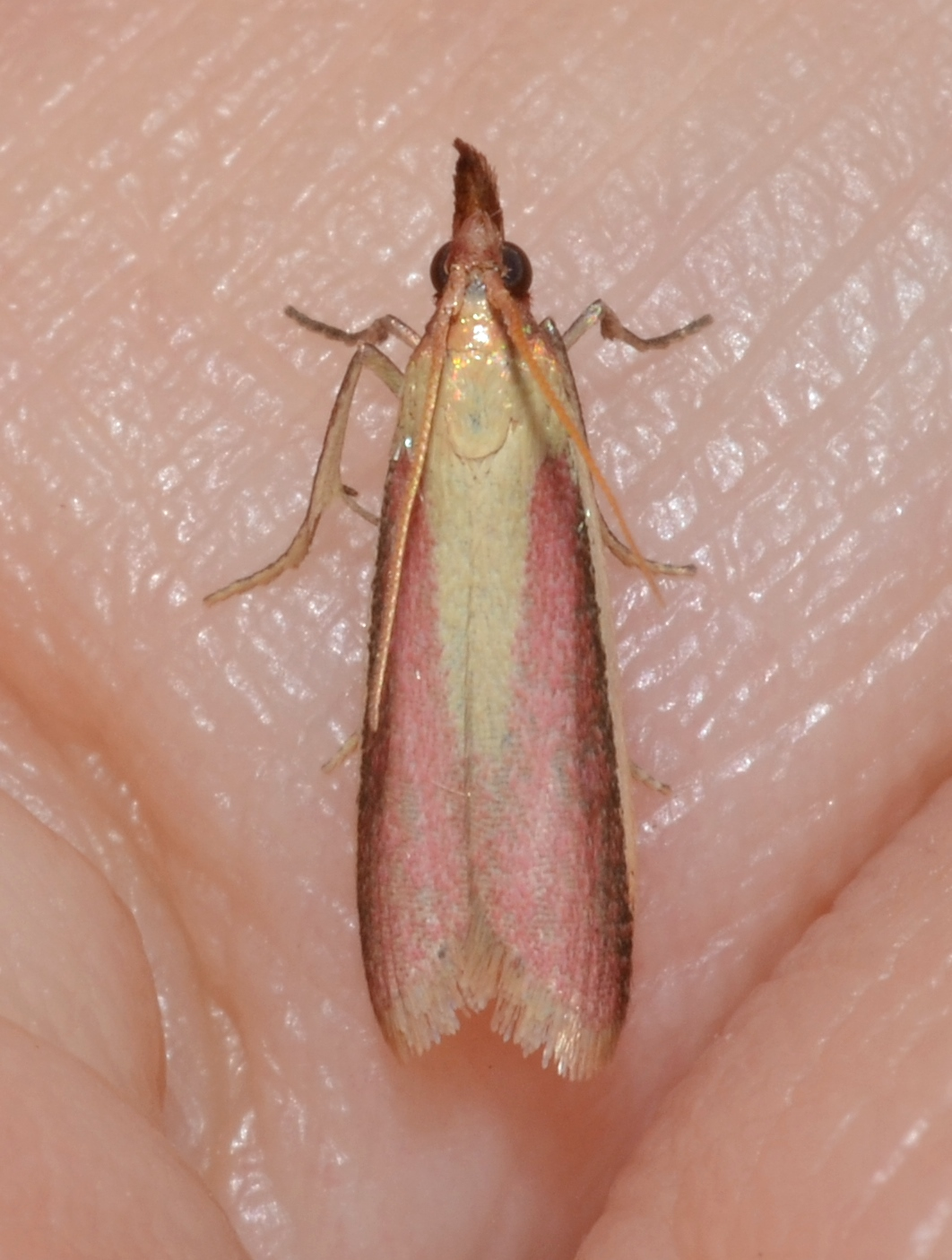
Carmine snout moth, Peoria approximella

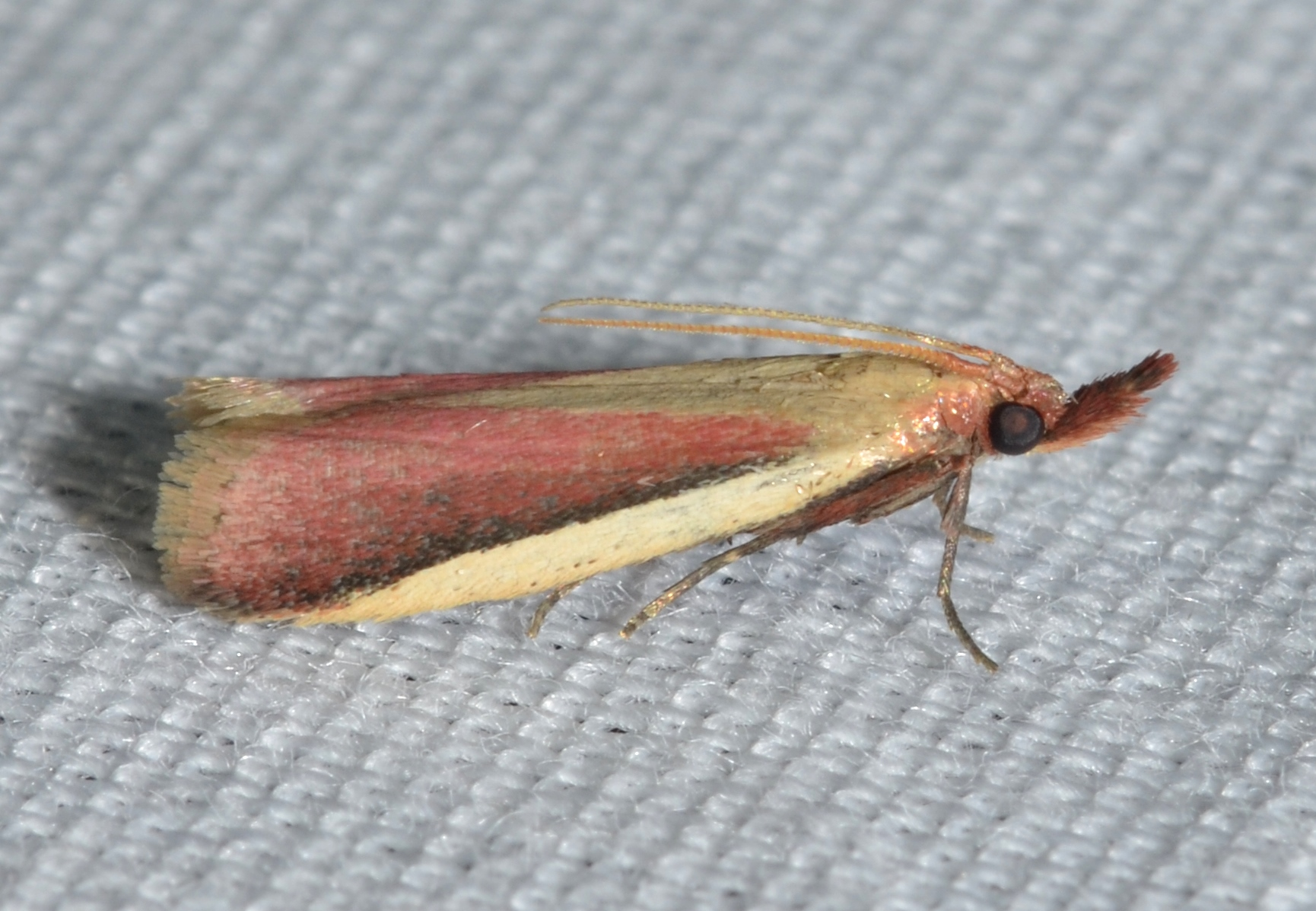
Carmine snout moth, Peoria approximella
