= Taurometopa pyrometalla =

Scientific classification
- Domain: Eukaryota
- Kingdom: Animalia
- Phylum: Arthropoda
- Class: Insecta
- Order: Lepidoptera
- Family: Crambidae
- Genus: Taurometopa
- Species: T. pyrometalla

Binomial name
- Taurometopa pyrometalla Meyrick, 1933

Species of moth

Taurometopa pyrometalla is a moth in the family Crambidae. It was described by Edward Meyrick in 1933. It is found in Thailand.
