= Taurometopa aryrostrota =

Scientific classification
- Kingdom: Animalia
- Phylum: Arthropoda
- Class: Insecta
- Order: Lepidoptera
- Family: Crambidae
- Genus: Taurometopa
- Species: T. aryrostrota

Binomial name
- Taurometopa aryrostrota (Hampson, 1917)

Synonyms
- Balaenifrons aryrostrota Hampson, 1917

Species of moth

Taurometopa aryrostrota is a moth in the family Crambidae. It was described by George Hampson in 1917. It is found in Sri Lanka.

The wingspan is about 16 mm. The forewings are golden yellow with five waved crimson red bands suffused with silvery purple. The hindwings are yellow, the apical area suffused with brown.
