= Wakiva =

Wakiva may refer to:

- Wakiva I, a large pleasure and cruising yacht owned by Marcellus Hartley Dodge, Sr.
- USS Wakiva II (SP-160), an armed yacht, destroyed in World War I
- Wakiva, a diesel-powered yawl, commissioned by Harkness Edwards and launched June 1938 by Jakobson Shipyard

== See also ==
- Wekiva (disambiguation)
