= Lake Norris =

Lake in the state of Florida, United States

- Location in Florida
- Location: Lake County, Florida
- Coordinates: 28°56′16″N 81°32′06″W
- Basin countries: United States
- Surface area: 1,159.71 acres (469.32 ha)

Lake Norris is an undeveloped fresh water lake in Paisley, Lake County, Florida. It has an area of 1,159.71 acres (469.32 ha).

It is located roughly 2 miles (3.2 km) south of Johnson's Corner in Paisley. The north shore is occupied by Camp La-No-Che, a local Boy Scout camp. The southern shore exits to Blackwater Creek. The southeastern shore has roughly 11 private residences. The rest of the shoreline is primarily owned by St. Johns River Water Management District and used as scrub brush drainage for the aquifer. There is no public access or public boating ramp on the lake. The local ecosystem is part of the Ocala National Forest.

Because of the numerous cypress trees surrounding the lake the water is of a very brown color filled with tannic acid. The local Boy Scouts in the area have observed more than 100 active nests of Osprey in the cypress trees around the lake. Other wildlife in the area include alligators, snakes, and gopher tortoises.
