= Little Wekiva River =

River in Florida, United States

- Location of the mouth in Florida Little Wekiva River (the United States)

Location
- Country: United States
- State: Florida
- Counties: Orange and Seminole
- Cities: Orlando, Altamonte Springs, Longwood, Florida
- City: Longwood, Florida

Physical characteristics
- Source: Lake Lawne
  - location: Orlando, Florida
  - coordinates: 28°34′2″N 81°26′19″W
- 2nd source: Spring Lake
  - location: Altamonte Springs, Florida
  - coordinates: 28°39′7″N 81°23′53″W
- Mouth: Confluence with Wekiva River
  - location: Longwood, Florida
  - coordinates: 28°45′20.5″N 81°24′58.2″W
- Length: 15 mi (24 km)
- Basin size: 42 sq mi (110 km^{2})

Basin features
- Tributaries
  - left: Starbuck Spring Run
  - right: Spring Lake Run, Sanlando Springs Run, Palm Springs Run, Ginger Ale Springs Run, Pegasus Springs Run
- Progression : Little Wekiva River-Wekiva River- St. Johns River-Atlantic Ocean

The Little Wekiva River is a stream in the Greater Orlando area of Florida in the United States. The 15-mile (24 km) long, northward flowing stream is a tributary of the Wekiva River, which later joins the St. Johns River, the longest river in the state of Florida. The Little Wekiva drainage basin is about 42 square miles (110 km^{2}) located in the urbanized area north and west of Downtown Orlando.

As of 2021, much of the Little Wekiva River has silted up.

== Sources ==
Little Wekiva is part of the middle basin of the St. Johns River. The St. Johns River Water Management District place the headwater of the creek at Lake Lawne, about 5 miles (8.0 km) northwest of downtown Orlando. The Geographic Names Information System (GNIS), though, list the source of the river at Spring Lake, an 84-acre (34 ha) spring-fed lake in Altamonte Springs, Florida.
