= Ponderous siltsnail =

Conservation status
- Vulnerable (IUCN 2.3)

- Critically Imperiled (NatureServe)

Scientific classification
- Kingdom: Animalia
- Phylum: Mollusca
- Class: Gastropoda
- Subclass: Caenogastropoda
- Order: Littorinimorpha
- Family: Hydrobiidae
- Genus: Floridobia
- Species: F. ponderosa

Binomial name
- Floridobia ponderosa (Thompson, 1968)

Synonyms
- Cincinnatia ponderosa Thompson, 1968

Species of gastropod

The ponderous siltsnail or ponderous spring snail, scientific name Floridobia ponderosa, is a species of small freshwater snail, an aquatic gastropod mollusk in the family Hydrobiidae. This species is endemic to Palm Spring in Florida.
