= Pygmy siltsnail =

Conservation status
- Vulnerable (IUCN 2.3)

- Possibly Extinct (NatureServe)

Scientific classification
- Kingdom: Animalia
- Phylum: Mollusca
- Class: Gastropoda
- Subclass: Caenogastropoda
- Order: Littorinimorpha
- Family: Hydrobiidae
- Genus: Floridobia
- Species: F. parva

Binomial name
- Floridobia parva (Thompson, 1968)

Synonyms
- Cincinnatia parva Thompson, 1968

Species of gastropod

The pygmy siltsnail, scientific name Floridobia parva, is a species of very small freshwater snail with a gill and an operculum, an aquatic gastropod mollusk in the family Hydrobiidae. This species is endemic to Blue Spring in Florida.
