= Taurometopa pulverea =

Scientific classification
- Domain: Eukaryota
- Kingdom: Animalia
- Phylum: Arthropoda
- Class: Insecta
- Order: Lepidoptera
- Family: Crambidae
- Genus: Taurometopa
- Species: T. pulverea

Binomial name
- Taurometopa pulverea Hampson, 1917

Synonyms
- Anerastidia pulverea Hampson, 1917; Mampava pulverea

Species of moth

Taurometopa pulverea is a species of moth in the family Crambidae. It is found in Argentina.
