= Enterprise siltsnail =

Conservation status
- Vulnerable (IUCN 2.3)

- Possibly Extinct (NatureServe)

Scientific classification
- Kingdom: Animalia
- Phylum: Mollusca
- Class: Gastropoda
- Subclass: Caenogastropoda
- Order: Littorinimorpha
- Family: Hydrobiidae
- Genus: Floridobia
- Species: F. monroensis

Binomial name
- Floridobia monroensis (Dall, 1885)

Synonyms
- Cincinnatia monroensis (Dall, 1885)

Species of gastropod

The Enterprise siltsnail, also known as the Enterprise spring snail, scientific name Floridobia monroensis, is a species of very small freshwater snails that have an operculum, aquatic gastropod mollusks in the family Hydrobiidae, the mud snails.

This species is endemic to Benson's Mineral Spring, in Florida. It is named after the settlement of Enterprise, which is or was near Lake Monroe in Volusia County, Florida.

Like other Floridobia siltsnails, F. monroensis grazes on periphyton and fine detritus on submerged surfaces in clear spring runs. In Florida’s thermally stable springs, it reproduces through much of the year, a typical pattern for the genus.
