= Ichetucknee siltsnail =

Conservation status
- Vulnerable (IUCN 3.1)

- Critically Imperiled (NatureServe)

Scientific classification
- Kingdom: Animalia
- Phylum: Mollusca
- Class: Gastropoda
- Subclass: Caenogastropoda
- Order: Littorinimorpha
- Family: Hydrobiidae
- Genus: Floridobia
- Species: F. mica

Binomial name
- Floridobia mica (Thompson, 1968)

Synonyms
- Cincinnatia mica Thompson, 1968

Species of gastropod

The Ichetucknee siltsnail, also known as the sand grain snail, scientific name Floridobia mica, is a species of small freshwater snail, an aquatic gastropod in the family Hydrobiidae.

This species is characterized by its association with bryophytes and eelgrass, with females typically being larger than males. The snails show sexual dimorphism, and their population includes both adult and juvenile individuals, indicating active recruitment. The majority of specimens are juveniles, identified by having one to one and one-half whorls.

== Distribution ==
This species is endemic to Ichetucknee Springs in Florida. The snail is confined to an extremely small geographic area, with its extent of occurrence limited to the surface area of Coffee Spring, which ranges between 18.8 and 364 square meters depending on water levels. Coffee Spring provides a stable environment with uniform temperature and flow conditions, critical for the snail's survival.

== Ecology ==
This siltsnail primarily inhabits bryophyte-covered limestone bedrock and eelgrass habitats within Coffee Spring. It grazes on periphyton and detritus and can tolerate low dissolved oxygen levels, which protect it from most fish predators. The snail's life history and environmental requirements remain largely understudied, but it is known to have a one-year lifespan with continuous recruitment in warm spring systems.

== Conservation ==
Several significant threats jeopardize the survival of Floridobia mica. One of the primary threats is habitat loss. Declining spring flows and groundwater levels, driven by increased human water usage, significantly reduce the snail's habitat area. Additionally, nitrate pollution from agricultural runoff could lead to the growth of filamentous algae blooms, which would degrade the habitat by shading out bryophytes and eelgrass.

Another significant threat comes from invasive species. The presence of non-native snails, such as the red-rimmed Melania (Melanoides tuberculata) and the quilted melania (Tarebia granifera), poses a substantial risk. These invasive species are known to displace native snails and have already been observed in the Ichetucknee River system.

A third critical threat is the unknown source of groundwater feeding Coffee Spring. This unidentified source adds a layer of vulnerability, as potential pollutants from unknown origins could adversely affect the siltsnail population.

Floridobia mica is categorized as critically imperiled both globally (G1) and within Florida (S1) due to its highly restricted distribution and vulnerability to environmental changes. The species is recognized as a Species of Greatest Conservation Need by the Florida Fish and Wildlife Conservation Commission. It was also included in a 2010 petition for federal listing as threatened or endangered. Efforts to protect the Ichetucknee siltsnail include establishing a baseline for population monitoring, erecting barriers to prevent recreational disturbances, and continuous monitoring for invasive species.
