= Peoria calamistis =

Scientific classification
- Domain: Eukaryota
- Kingdom: Animalia
- Phylum: Arthropoda
- Class: Insecta
- Order: Lepidoptera
- Family: Pyralidae
- Genus: Peoria
- Species: P. calamistis

Binomial name
- Peoria calamistis (Hampson, 1917)

Synonyms
- Metaraphia calamistis Hampson, 1917; Taurometopa calamistis

Species of moth

Peoria calamistis is a moth in the family Crambidae. It was described by George Hampson in 1917. It is found in Colombia.

The wingspan is about 28 mm. The forewings are ochreous, irrorated (sprinkled) with black brown. There is a black antemedial mark and a terminal series of points. The hindwings are ochreous with a brownish termen.
