= Seminole siltsnail =

Conservation status
- Vulnerable (IUCN 2.3)

- Critically Imperiled (NatureServe)

Scientific classification
- Kingdom: Animalia
- Phylum: Mollusca
- Class: Gastropoda
- Subclass: Caenogastropoda
- Order: Littorinimorpha
- Family: Hydrobiidae
- Genus: Floridobia
- Species: F. vanhyningi

Binomial name
- Floridobia vanhyningi (Vanatta, 1934)

Synonyms
- Cincinnatia vanhyningi (Vanatta, 1934); Lyogyrus vanhyningi Vanatta, 1934

Species of gastropod

The Seminole siltsnail or Seminole spring snail, scientific name Floridobia vanhyningi, is a species of small freshwater snail, an aquatic gastropod mollusk in the family Hydrobiidae. This species is endemic to Seminole Springs in Florida, United States.
