= Crystal siltsnail =

Conservation status
- Vulnerable (IUCN 2.3)

- Critically Imperiled (NatureServe)

Scientific classification
- Kingdom: Animalia
- Phylum: Mollusca
- Class: Gastropoda
- Subclass: Caenogastropoda
- Order: Littorinimorpha
- Family: Hydrobiidae
- Genus: Floridobia
- Species: F. helicogyra

Binomial name
- Floridobia helicogyra (Thompson, 1968)

Synonyms
- Cincinnatia helicogyra Thompson, 1968

Species of gastropod

The crystal siltsnail, also known as the helicoid spring snail, scientific name Floridobia helicogyra, is a species of small freshwater snail with a gill and an operculum, an aquatic gastropod mollusk in the family Hydrobiidae.

This species is endemic to Hunter Spring, in Florida. It is threatened by habitat loss.
