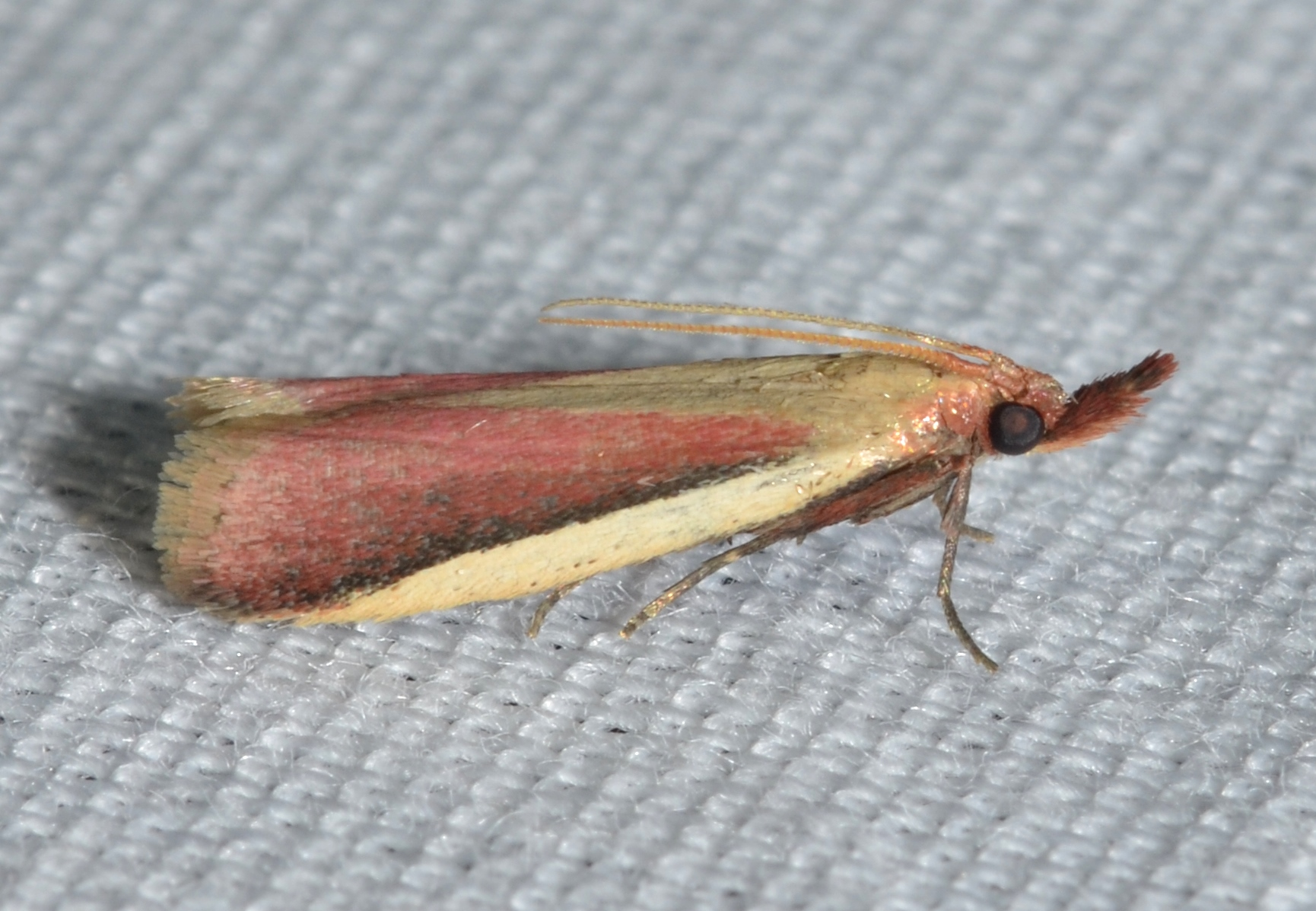
- Peoria approximella

Scientific classification
- Domain: Eukaryota
- Kingdom: Animalia
- Phylum: Arthropoda
- Class: Insecta
- Order: Lepidoptera
- Family: Pyralidae
- Subfamily: Phycitinae
- Tribe: Anerastiini
- Genus: Peoria; Ragonot, 1887

Synonyms
- Aurora Ragonot, 1887; Statina Ragonot, 1887; Ceara Ragonot, 1888; Calera Ragonot, 1888; Altoona Hulst, 1888; Cayuga Hulst, 1888; Volusia Hulst, 1890; Wekiva Hulst, 1890; Osceola Hulst, 1891; Chipeta Hulst, 1892; Trivolusia Dyar, 1903; Ollia Dyar, 1904

= Peoria (moth) =

Genus of moths

Peoria is a genus of moths of the snout moth family (Pyralidae). The genus was erected by Émile Louis Ragonot in 1887.

== Species ==
In alphabetical order:

- Peoria albifasciata (Hampson, 1918)
- Peoria approximella (Walker, 1866)
- Peoria bipartitella Ragonot, 1887
- Peoria calamistis (Hampson, 1917)
- Peoria cashmiralis (Hampson, 1903)
- Peoria discinotella (Ragonot)
- Peoria floridella Shaffer, 1968
- Peoria gaudiella (Hulst, 1890)
- Peoria gemmatella (Hulst, 1887)
- Peoria holoponerella (Dyar, 1908)
- Peoria johnstoni Shaffer, 1968
- Peoria longipalpella (Ragonot, 1887)
- Peoria luteicostella (Ragonot, 1887)
- Peoria opacella (Hulst, 1887)
- Peoria padreella Blanchard, 1981
- Peoria punctata Shaffer, 1976
- Peoria punctilineella (Hampson, 1901)
- Peoria roseotinctella (Ragonot, 1887)
- Peoria rosinella (Hampson, 1918)
- Peoria rostrella (Ragonot, 1887)
- Peoria santaritella (Dyar, 1904)
- Peoria tetradella (Zeller, 1872)
