= Sanlando Springs, Florida =

Sanlando Springs
- Unincorporated community
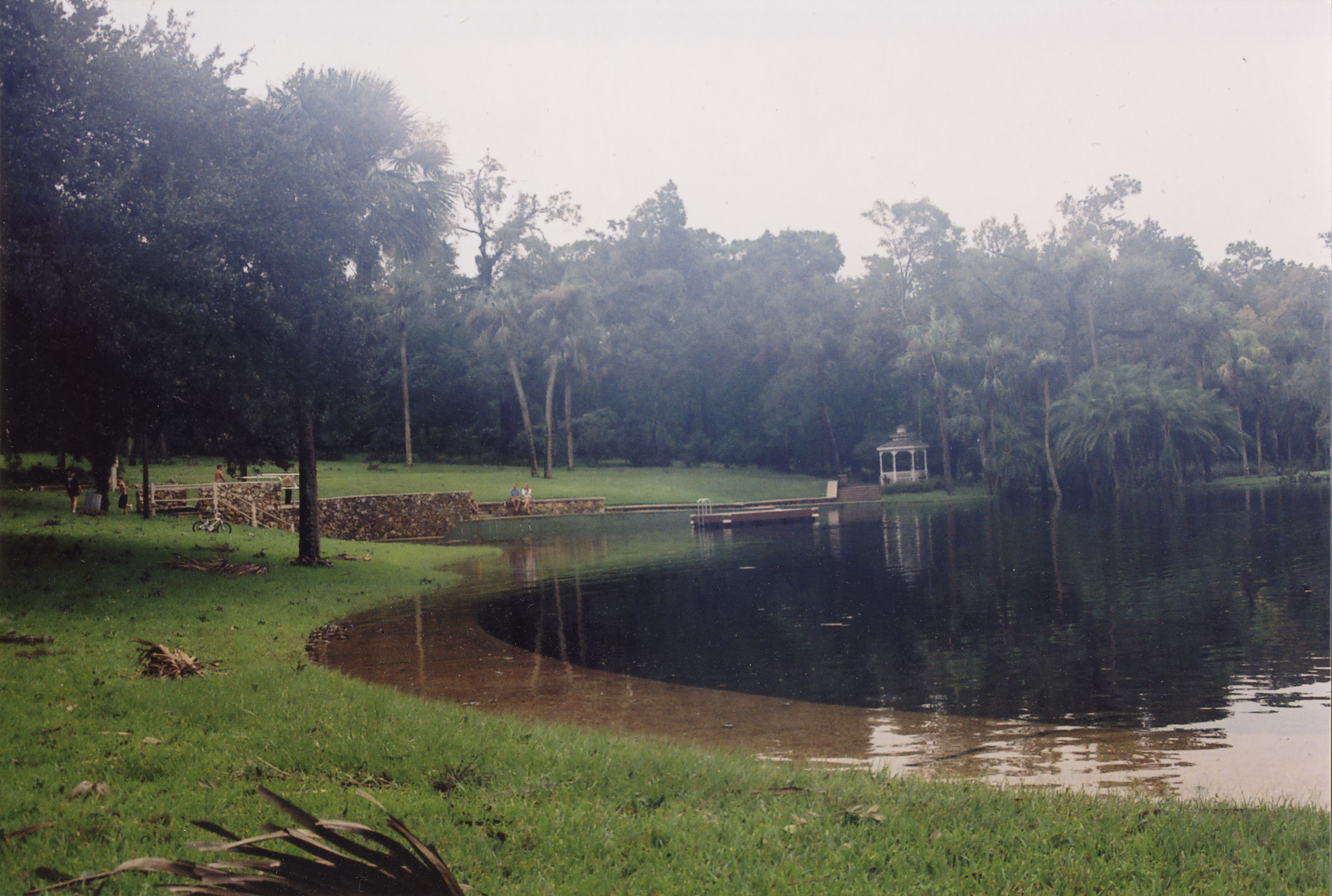
- Flooding of Sanlando Springs after Hurricane Frances in 2004

- Location within Seminole County, Florida
- Coordinates: 28°41′01″N 81°22′54″W
- Country: United States
- State: Florida
- County: Seminole
- Elevation: 56 ft (17 m)
- Time zone: UTC-5 (Eastern (EST))
  - Summer (DST): UTC-4 (EDT)
- Area codes: 407, 689 & 321
- GNIS feature ID: 290643

Sanlando Springs is a second magnitude freshwater spring and an unincorporated community in Seminole County, Florida, United States, just west of Longwood, Florida. Originally named Hoosier Springs by early settler Ingram Fletcher, the springs were later renamed for its location between the cities of Sanford and Orlando. From the 1930s through 1970, it was a privately owned and operated recreation area and park that was open to the general public for an entrance fee.

In 1970, the property was sold for conversion into a private residential development to be known as The Springs.

The spring itself is located behind the clubhouse of The Springs, a gated community. Although managed by the St. Johns River Water Management District, it is a private recreation and swimming area for residents of the community and respective guests and is no longer open to the general public.

The main swimming area formerly boasted a diving platform over the spring, approximately 6 ft (1.8 m) above the waters' surface until removed by the community board. There is also a floating man-made dock, approximately 40 ft (12.2 m) from the shoreline, to which guests may swim. The waters of the main spring eventually empty into the Wekiva River and from there into the St. Johns River. Sanlando Springs, along with nearby Rock Springs, Wekiwa Springs and Palm Springs, form the headwaters of the Wekiva River.

During times of heavy rain, such as the 2005 Atlantic Hurricane Season, the springs have been known to flood dramatically and certain areas of the spring during these times may be hazardous.

Near the main spring are several sulfur springs, which are generally unfit for swimming due to foul odor and possible presence of potentially dangerous wildlife, such as alligators.
