= Wekiwa siltsnail =

Conservation status
- Vulnerable (IUCN 3.1)

- Critically Imperiled (NatureServe)

Scientific classification
- Kingdom: Animalia
- Phylum: Mollusca
- Class: Gastropoda
- Subclass: Caenogastropoda
- Order: Littorinimorpha
- Family: Hydrobiidae
- Genus: Floridobia
- Species: F. wekiwae

Binomial name
- Floridobia wekiwae (Thompson, 1968)

Synonyms
- Cincinnatia wekiwae Thompson 1968

Species of gastropod

The Wekiwa siltsnail or Wekiwa spring snail, scientific name Floridobia wekiwae, is a species of small freshwater snail with an operculum, an aquatic gastropod mollusk in the family Hydrobiidae. This species is endemic to the Wekiwa Springs State Park in Florida, for which it is named.
