= Wekiva River =

River in Florida, United States of America

Wekiva River Wekiwa
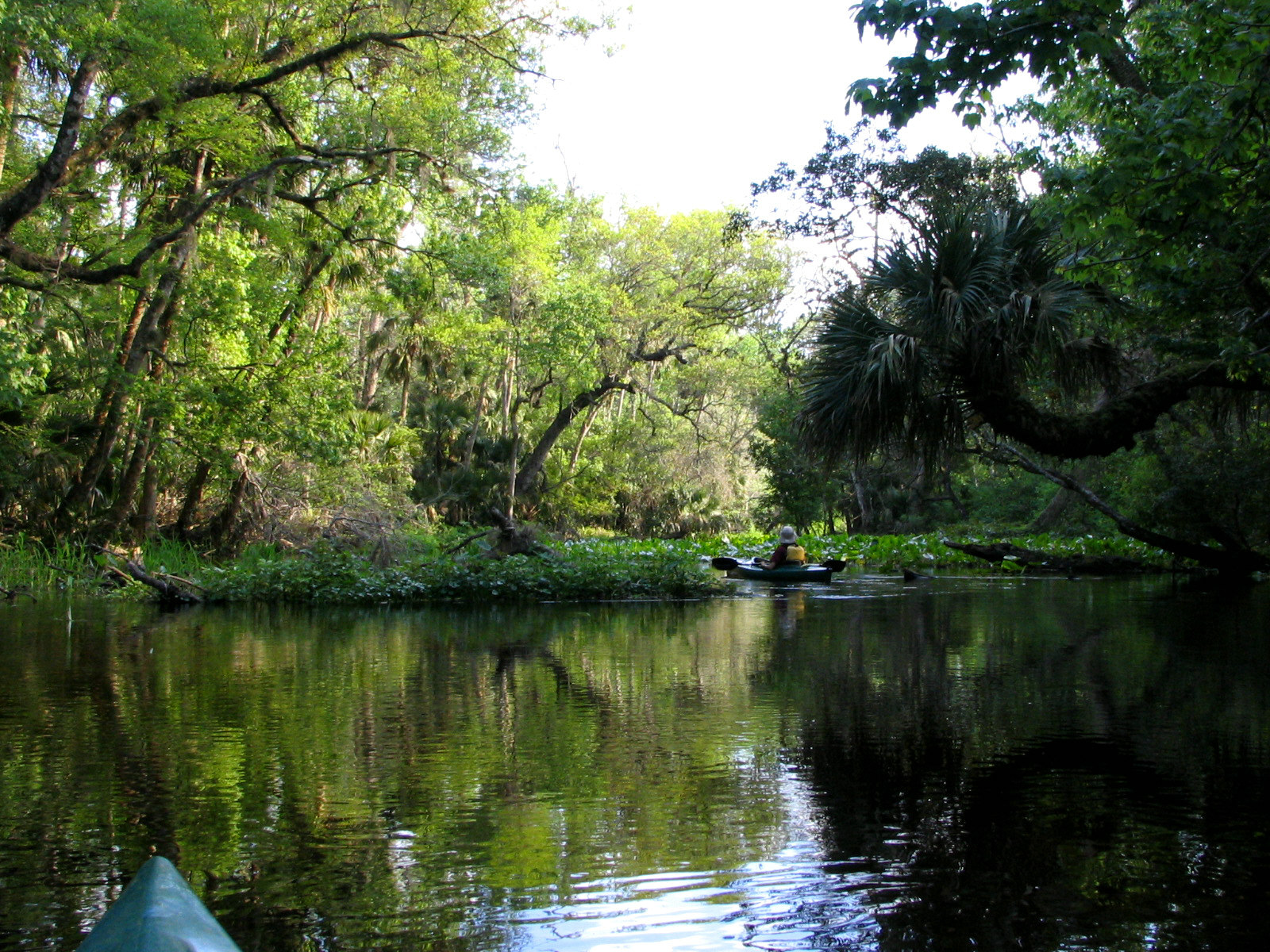
- Canoeing on the Wekiva River

- Location of the mouth in Florida Wekiva River (the United States)

Location
- Country: United States
- State: Florida
- Counties: Orange, Lake, Seminole

Physical characteristics
- Source: Wekiwa Springs
  - location: Apopka, Florida
  - coordinates: 28°42′42.80″N 81°27′37.5″W
  - elevation: 70 ft (21 m)
- Source confluence: Wekiwa Springs Run and Rock Springs Run
  - location: Apopka, Florida
  - coordinates: 28°42′54.5″N 81°26′57.2″W
- Mouth
  - location: DeBary, Florida
  - coordinates: 28°52′39.2″N 81°22′1.3″W
  - elevation: 30 ft (9.1 m)
- Length: 16.0 mi (25.7 km)
- Basin size: 351.113 sq mi (909.38 km^{2})

Basin features
- River system: St. Johns River
- Tributaries
  - left: Rock Springs Run, Mastodon/Wekiva Falls Run, Blackwater Creek
  - right: Sweetwater Creek, Little Wekiva River
- Progression : Wekiva River-St. Johns River-Atlantic Ocean

National Wild and Scenic River
- Type: Wild, Scenic, Recreational
- Designated: October 13, 2000

The Wekiva River (sometimes spelled Wekiwa, from Creek: Uekiwv meaning "spring of water") is a 16.0-mile-long (25.7 km) river in Central Florida, north of Orlando in the United States. It originates in Apopka and joins the St. Johns River, the longest river in the state, in DeBary. The Wekiva River system includes the main stem joined by three main tributaries - Rock Springs Run, Blackwater Creek, and the Little Wekiva River - and about 30 contributing groundwater springs. It is designated as a Florida State Canoe Trail, an Outstanding Florida Water, and an Aquatic Preserve by the Florida Department of Environmental Protection. The Wekiva River system is also one of the two rivers in Florida federally designated as a National Wild and Scenic River for its scenery, recreation, geology, and diverse habitats.

Wekiwa is the Creek-Seminole word for a spring, but contrary to popular belief that Wekiva means "flowing water", it was actually an alternate spelling used by developers. The pronunciation of a soft-w, sometimes perceived as a v or b, resulted in cartographers mislabeling maps in later years. The maps drawn in 1838 and 1849 were spelled Wekiwa.

== Overview ==
The Wekiva River system is located in three counties - Orange, Seminole, and then Lake - with a total drainage basin of 351.113 km^{2} (135.565 sq mi). The Wekiva River nearly follows the boundary between Orange and Seminole Counties. After Orange County, the river separates Lake County and Seminole County.

== Origin ==
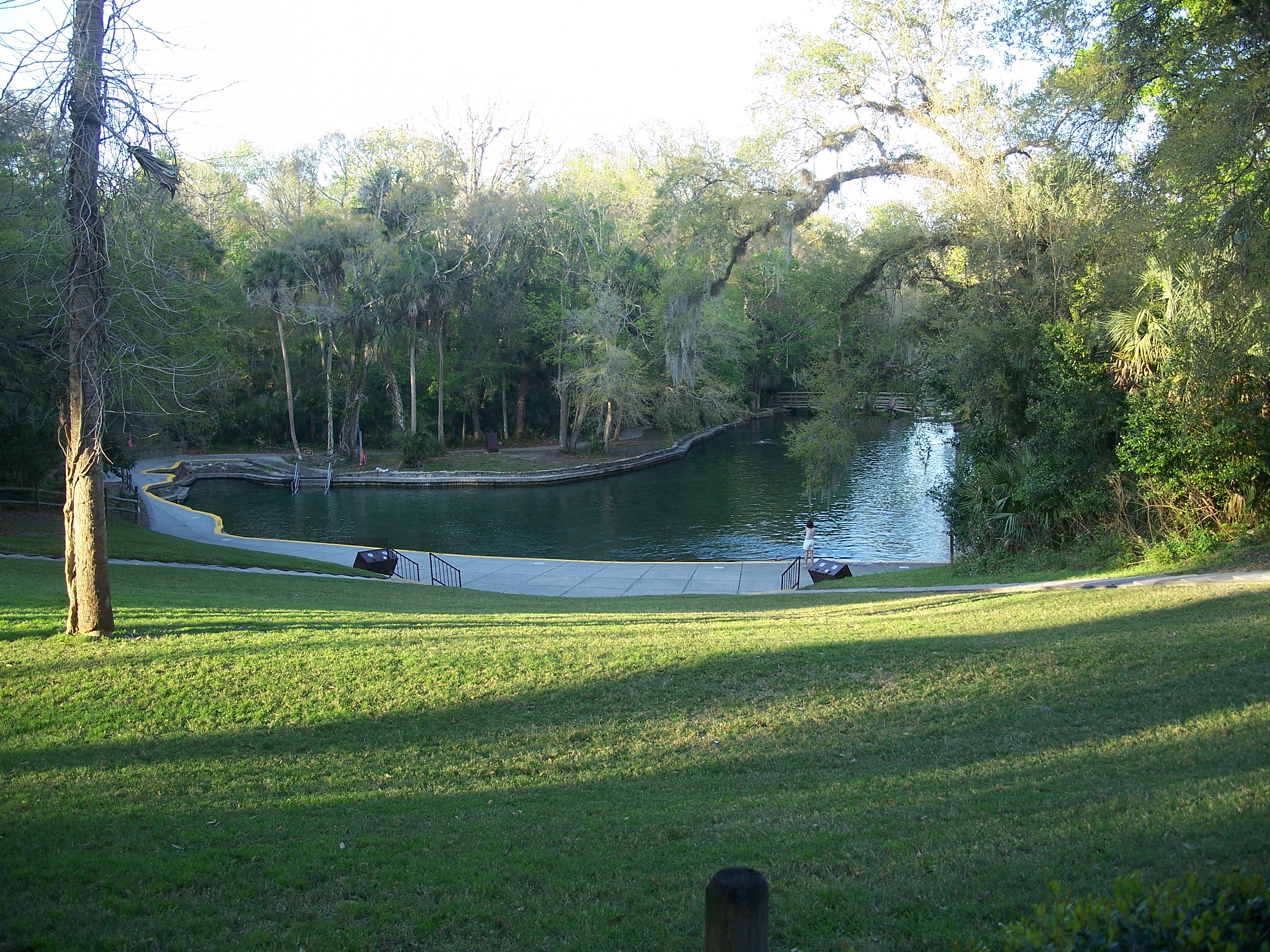
Wekiwa Springs, the source of Wekiva River

According to the St. Johns River Water Management District and the Geographic Names Information System, the Wekiva River originates from Wekiwa Springs, and about 3/4 mile (1.2 km) from the spring, Wekiva is joined by the Rock Springs Run.

The Florida Department of Environmental Protection defines the portion of the river from Wekiwa Springs to the confluence with Rock Springs Run as the Wekiwa Springs Run. The Wekiva River then starts from the confluence of the two spring runs and joins the St. Johns River after 15.3 miles (24.6 km). Other contributing springs are Sanlando Springs and Palm Springs.

== Course ==
=== Wekiwa Springs ===
The headwater of the Wekiva River is the Wekiwa Springs, a second-magnitude spring located within the Wekiwa Springs State Park in Apopka. The spring has a mean discharge of 66.5 cu ft/s (1.88 m^{3}/s) or 5,745,600 cubic feet (42,980,000 US gal) per day emanating from two vents, the largest of which is 35 by 5 ft (10.7 by 1.5 m) located 15 ft (4.6 m) under the water. A weir located about 270 ft (82 m) from the springs forms a 200-by-100-foot (61 by 30 m)-wide pool for swimming. At 170 ft (52 m) from the weir, the river widens into a trapezoidal pool about 430 ft (130 m) at its widest. The clear, bluish-green water narrows into a 60-foot (18 m)-wide run as it flows northeastward.

=== Rock Springs Run ===
After only about 3/4 mile (1.2 km) from the headwater, the Wekiva River is joined by Rock Springs Run, a spring-fed stream that originates from Rock Springs, a second-magnitude spring located about 4 miles (6.4 km) northwest of Wekiwa Springs. Rock Springs is situated inside Kelly Park, an Orange County park in Apopka. After leaving the county park, the stream enters the Wekiwa Springs State Park, meandering for a total length of 9.2 miles (14.8 km) before joining Wekiva River. After the confluence, the area left of the Wekiva River is protected by Rock Springs Run State Reserve, another Florida state park.

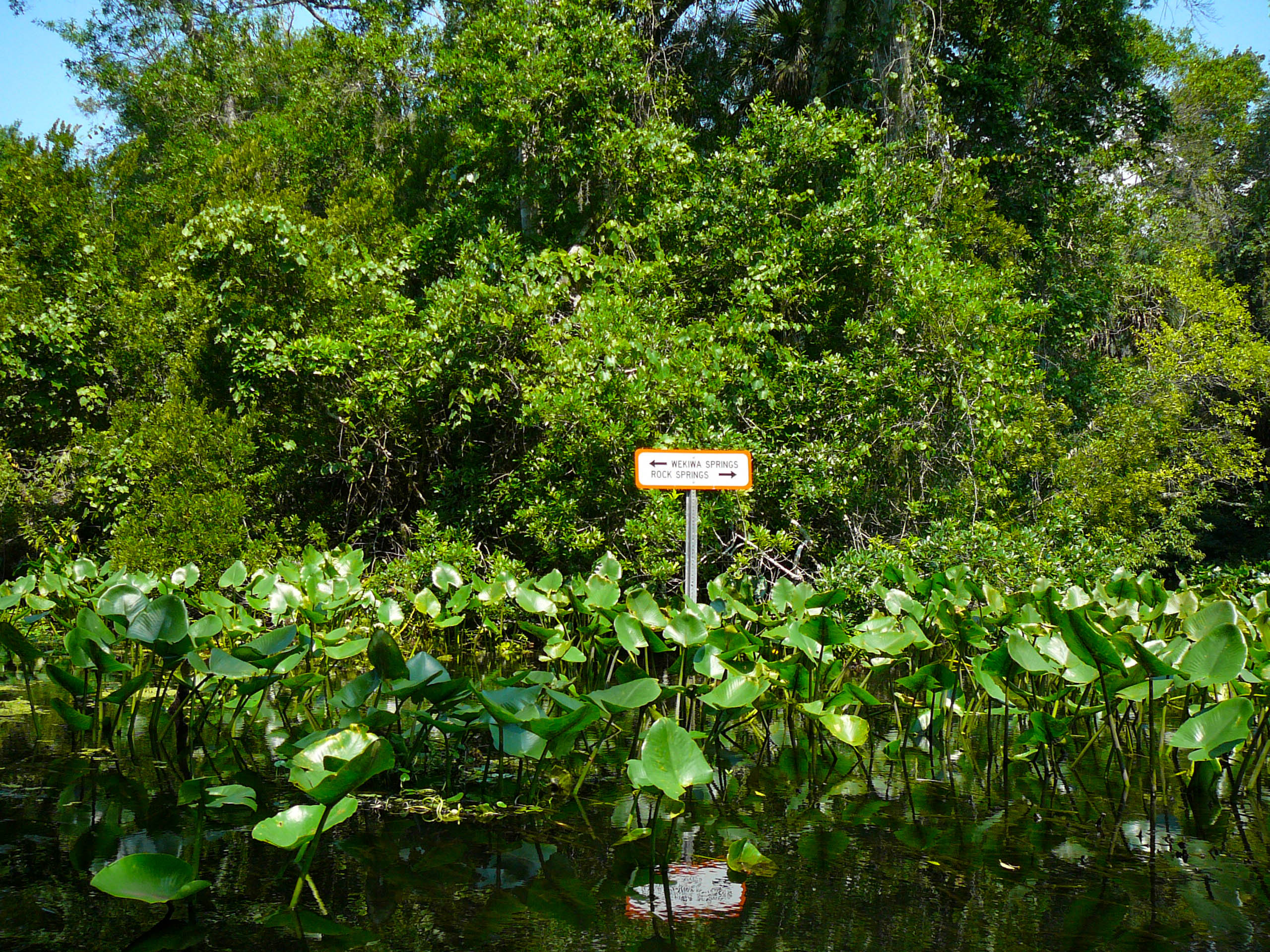
A sign at the confluence of Rock Springs Run and Wekiva River

=== Bridge to nowhere ===
In the late 1950s, a group of South Florida investors who owned hundreds of acres south of State Road 46 wanted to develop a community between Mount Plymouth and the Wekiva River. The first step was creating a road (now County Road 433) that would go south from East Lake County through Orange County and into Seminole County. The state of Florida built CR-433, but only in Lake County from SR-46 south to the Orange County line while the private group built the bridge across the Wekiva River. The unfinished portion of CR-433 in Orange County was supposed to connect to the bridge. Plans for the development failed (and so did the completion of the road) and the undeveloped land was donated to the state of Florida. Today, CR-433 is part of Rock Springs Run State Reserve. The bridge to nowhere spans the river before the Wekiva Island marina about 520 yards (480 m) from the confluence with Rock Springs, the first of the two bridges that spans the river. The bridge is located at the end of Miami Springs Drive in Seminole County.

=== Sweetwater Creek ===
The Wekiva is joined by Seminole County's Sweetwater Creek about 1.2 mi (1.9 km) from the headwater. The 2-mile-long (3.2 km) stream is merged by the outflow of Miami Springs, a third-magnitude spring, about 800 ft (240 m) before the confluence with Wekiva River.

=== Wekiva River Buffer Conservation Area ===
Beyond the creek, the eastern side of the river is protected by the Wekiva River Buffer Conservation Area, a 2,570-acre (1,040 ha) protected seasonal wetlands of lush floodplain forest of hardwoods, ferns, and sabal palms along the Wekiva and Little Wekiva Rivers. Protecting the natural condition of the area helps preserve the water quality of both rivers.

=== Little Wekiva River ===
The Little Wekiva River merges with the Wekiva River about 4.7 mi (7.6 km) from the source. The 15-mile-long (24 km) Little Wekiva River is the only tributary influenced by the areas north and west of urban Orlando. The St. Johns River Water Management District has worked with the Florida Department of Environmental Protection, the Florida Department of Transportation, the city of Altamonte Springs, Seminole and Orange counties, environmental interest groups and basin residents to find solutions in rehabilitating and protecting the Little Wekiva to minimize its negative impact in the water quality of the Wekiva River. In Longwood before the Little Wekiva enters the Wekiva River Buffer Conservation Area, several second- and third-magnitude springs, including the Sanlando Springs, replenish the Little Wekiva with fresh underground water.

=== River Bridges ===
The State Road 46 and State Road 429 tri-spans are the only active roads that span the river with the bridges about 9 miles (14 km) from the Wekiwa Springs State Park.

=== Black Water Creek ===
The last main tributary of the Wekiva River is the 19-mile (31 km) Blackwater Creek, which joins the Wekiva about 2 miles (3.2 km) before the Wekiva joins the St. Johns River.

== See also ==
- List of Florida rivers
