= Wekiwa Springs State Park =

State park in Florida, United States

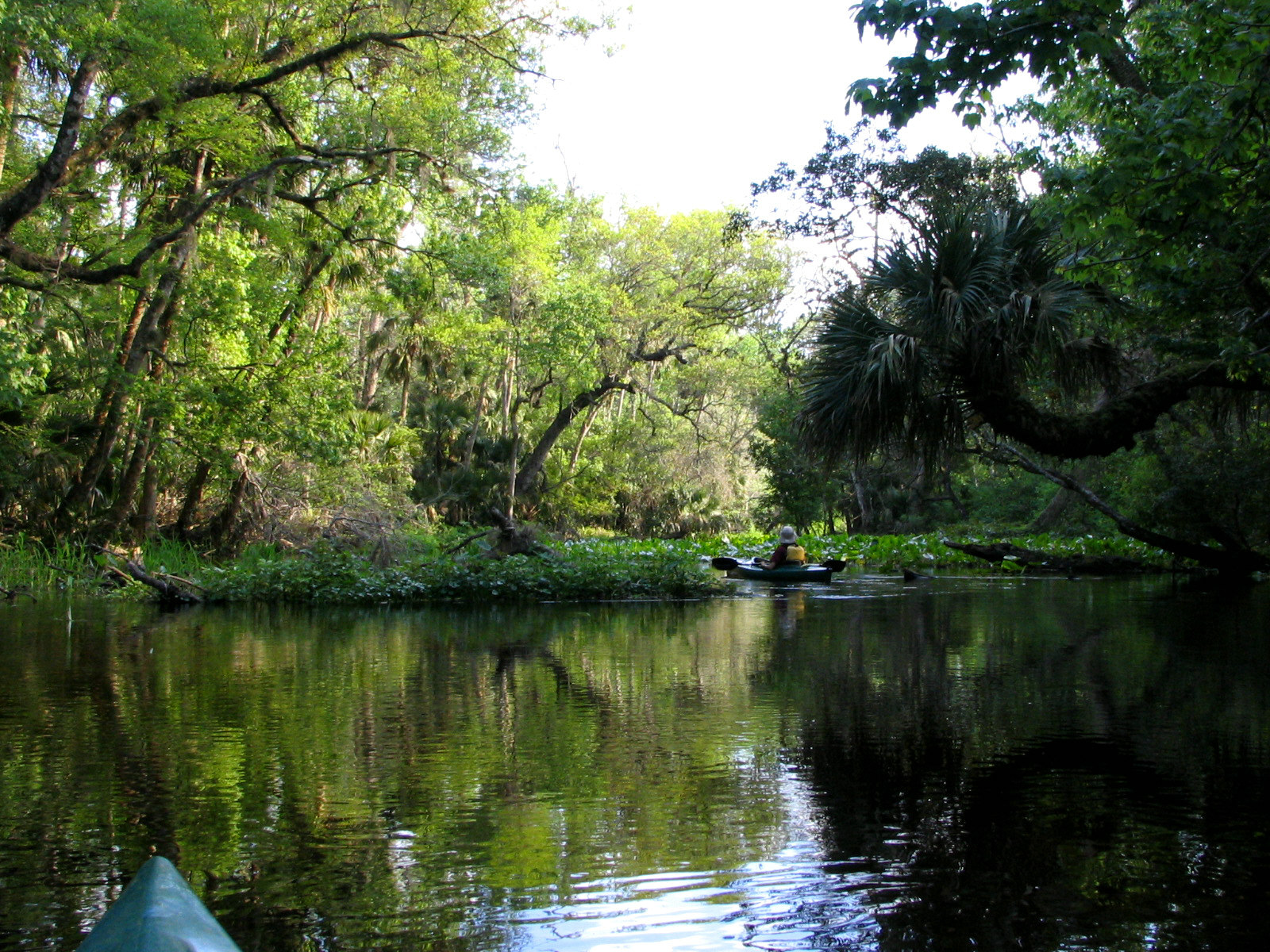
- Kayaking on Wekiwa Run near Wekiwa Springs

- Location within Florida Location within the United States
- Interactive map of Wekiwa Springs State Park
- Location: Orange County, Florida, USA
- Nearest city: Apopka, Florida
- Coordinates: 28°46′12″N 81°30′04″W
- Area: 7,000 acres (2,800 ha)
- Governing body: Florida Department of Environmental Protection

Wekiwa Springs State Park is a 7,000-acre (28 km^{2}) Florida State Park in Apopka, Florida. It is located 20 minutes north of Orlando, off Interstate 4 at exit 94, near Altamonte Springs and Longwood. The park also contains the head water of the Wekiva River. It also serves as the headquarters of one of the state's five AmeriCorps Florida State Parks chapters.

Although the springs are spelled Wekiwa Springs, the river and most subdivisions and streets in Seminole County use the Wekiva spelling. Wekiwa is the Creek word for a spring, but contrary to popular belief that Wekiva means "flowing water", it was actually an alternate spelling used by developers.

== History ==
In the 1800s, Central Florida was primarily agricultural; however, with the end of the Civil War, a tourist trade started to take advantage of Florida's temperate winters, long summers and natural environment, and out of that growth came Wekiwa Springs. In 1941, the Apopka Sportsmen's Club purchased the property from the Wilson Cypress Company, which had maintained a small turpentine camp in what is now the park, maintaining the area for recreational use.

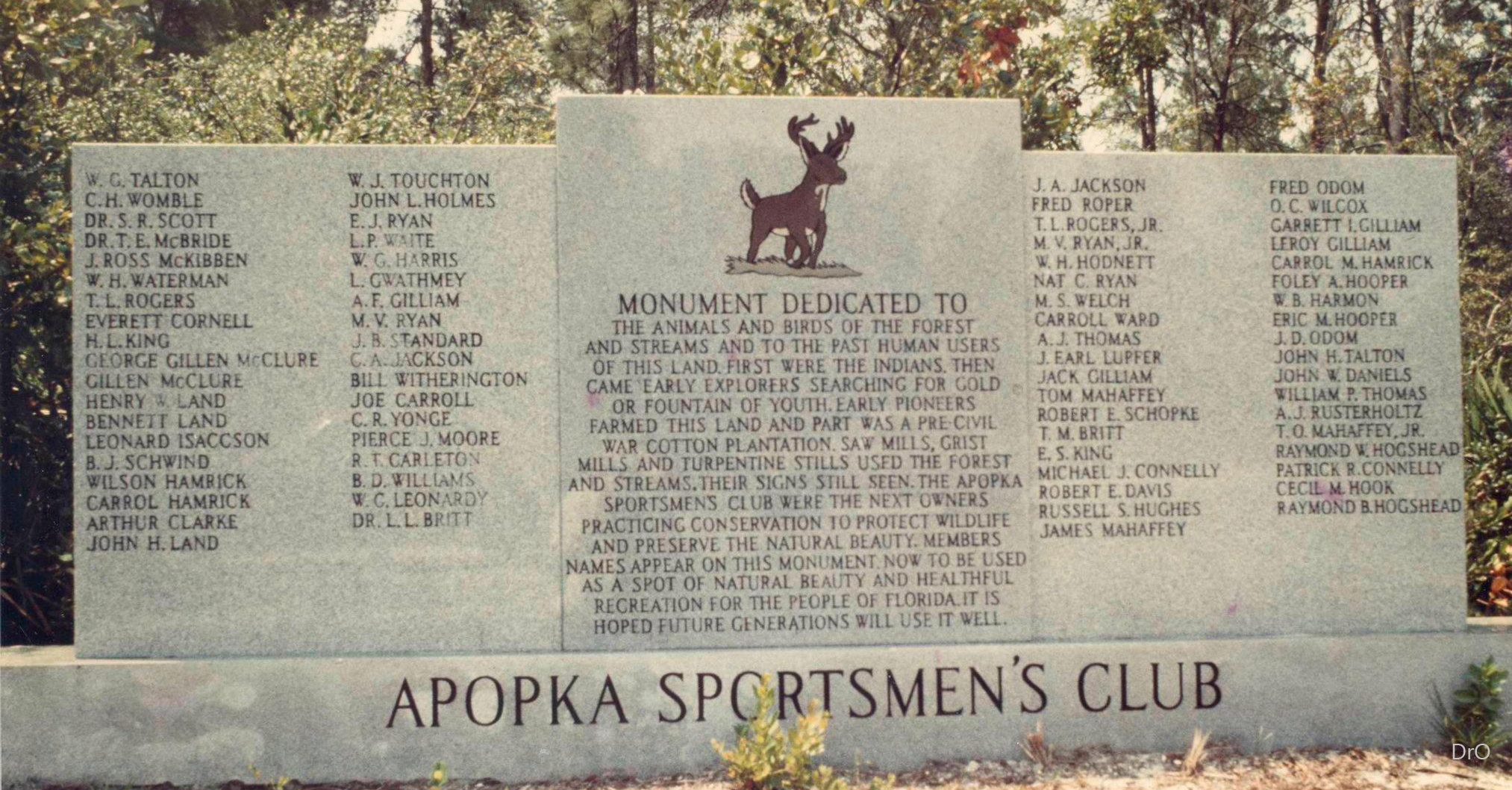
Sportsmens Club monument

John H. Land, Mayor of Apopka, Florida, and co-owner of the Apopka Sportsmen's Club campaigned the Florida State Legislature for three years to preserve the land. By 1969 the state of Florida expressed interest in the property for use as a state park, and, starting in 1970, visitors have come for the natural spring, crystal clear water, and the area's wildlife. The spring maintains a year-round water temperature of 72 °F (22 °C).

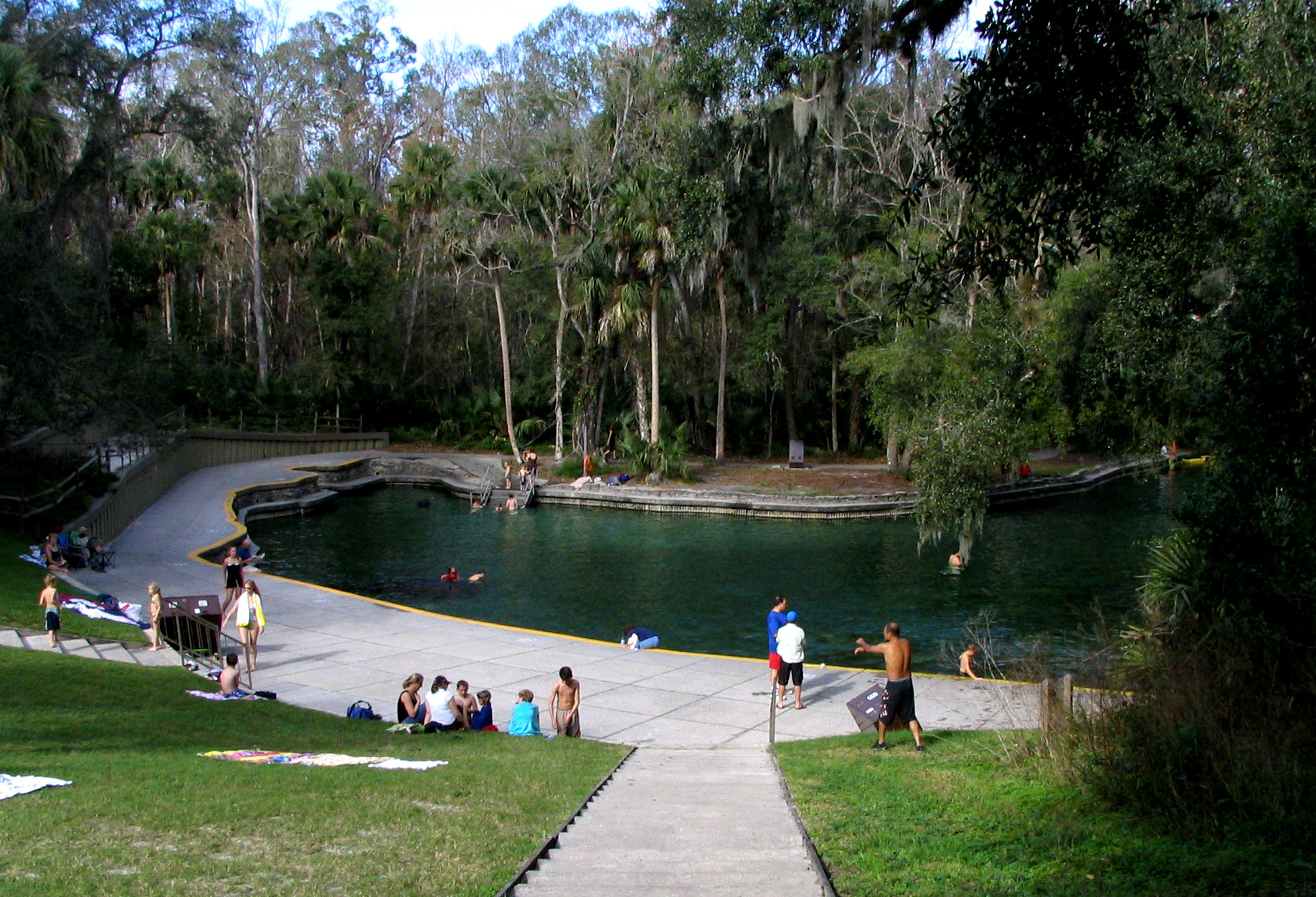
The spring

== Attractions ==
=== The spring ===
The main attraction at Wekiwa Springs Park is the spring, providing approximately 42 million gallons of water to the Wekiva River each day. The swimming area varies in depth from under a foot to five feet, and a small 15–20-foot-deep (4.6–6.1 m) cavern at the source of the spring. The cavern extends deeper into a cave, which has been explored in great detail. SCUBA and cave diving is strictly prohibited. The park has a nature center, and access to Wekiwa Springs, Wekiwa Springs Run, Rock Springs Run and the Wekiva River. Picnic pavilions are equipped with charcoal grills, electricity, water, and picnic tables. Canoes and kayaks can be rented at the nature center. There are four campsites in Wekiwa Springs State Park that can only be accessed by canoe or kayak.

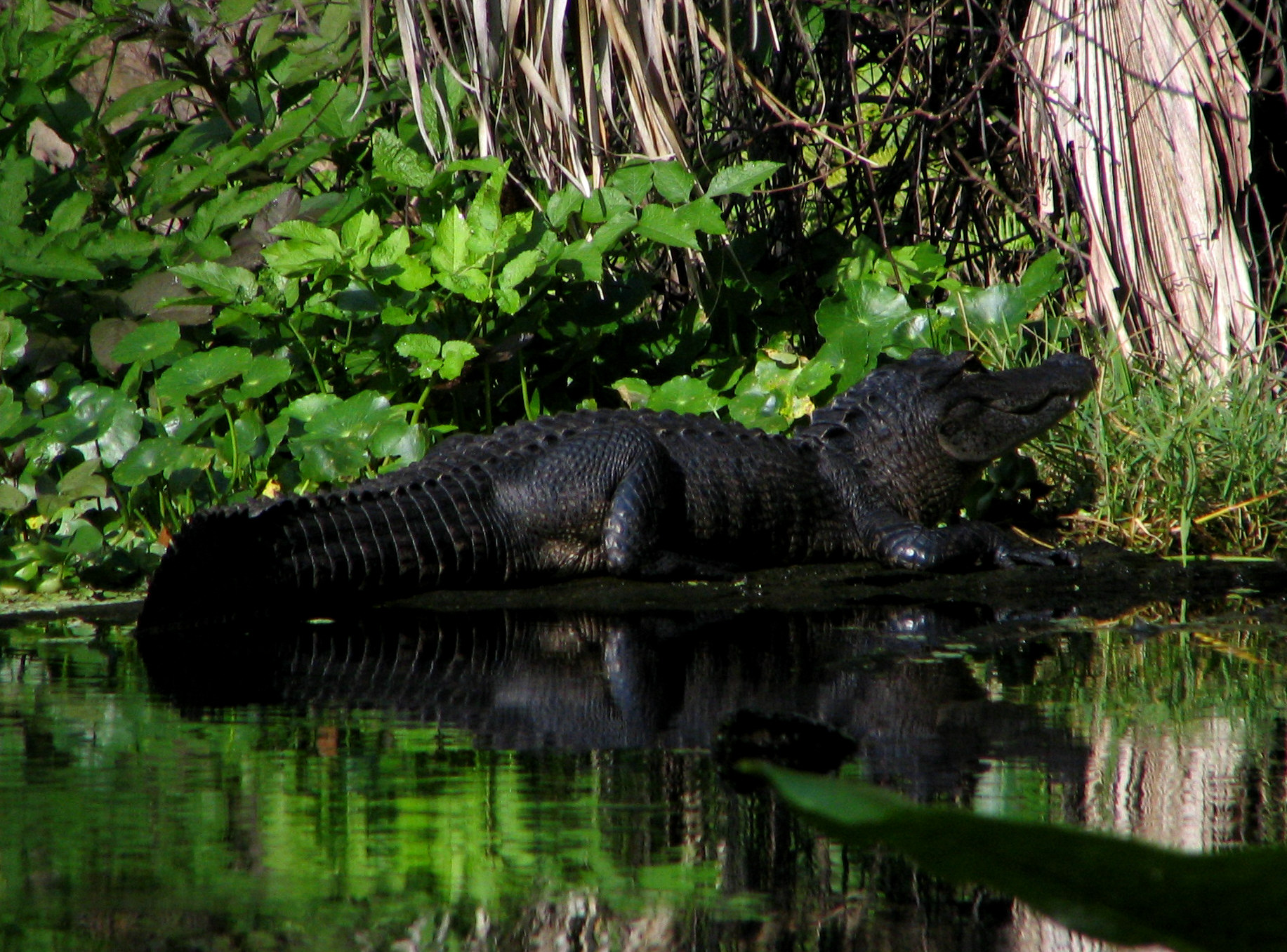
Alligator near the springs

=== Camping ===
Spread out across the 7,000 acres (28 km^{2}) is located a fairly substantial camping area. Infrastructure exists to support all forms and types of camping from tents to recreational vehicles. Family, primitive and cabin youth camping areas are available. Camp Cozy is located 3.5 miles (5.6 km) from the main spring and offers primitive camping. Pets are allowed, but must be leashed at all times. Intoxicants are prohibited.

=== Trails and hiking ===
There is a network of trails in the park, allowing for bicycling, hiking, and horseback riding. The main hiking trail is 13.5 miles (21.7 km) long, and the 5.3-mile (8.5 km) Volksmarch trail is marked with orange diamonds. A trail connects the main parking area with a distant parking lot at Sand Lake within the State park.

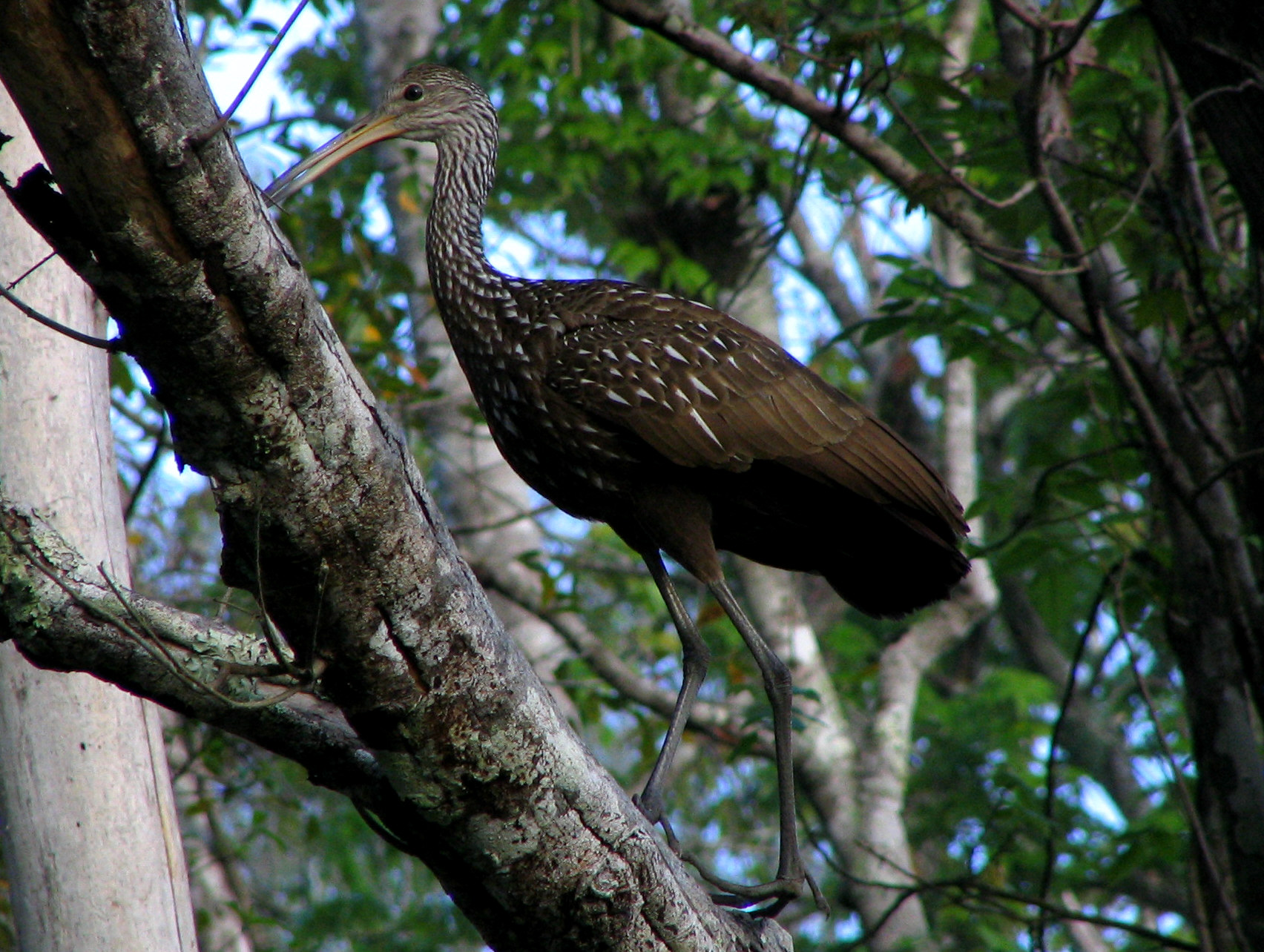
Limpkin in the Wekiva River.

== Ecology ==
The area around the spring is largely undeveloped and has acres of untouched Florida Ecology. Among the wildlife of the park are coyote, rabbit, deer, gray fox, bobcat, raccoon, opossum, alligator, and black bear. Fishing is permitted, as well as canoeing and snorkeling. However, SCUBA and specifically cave diving are not. The cave has been explored in the past to a distance of about 50 meters (160 feet).

Four rare snails are found in Wekiwa Springs. The Wekiwa hydrobe (Aphaostracon monas) and the Wekiwa siltsnail (Floridobia wekiwae) are endemic to Wekiwa Springs, and are described as "critically imperiled". Wekiwa Springs is also one of only three springs each in which the smooth rib hydrobe (Tryonia aequicostata) and the armored siltsnail (Spilochlamys gravis) are found. They are described as "vulnerable to extinction".

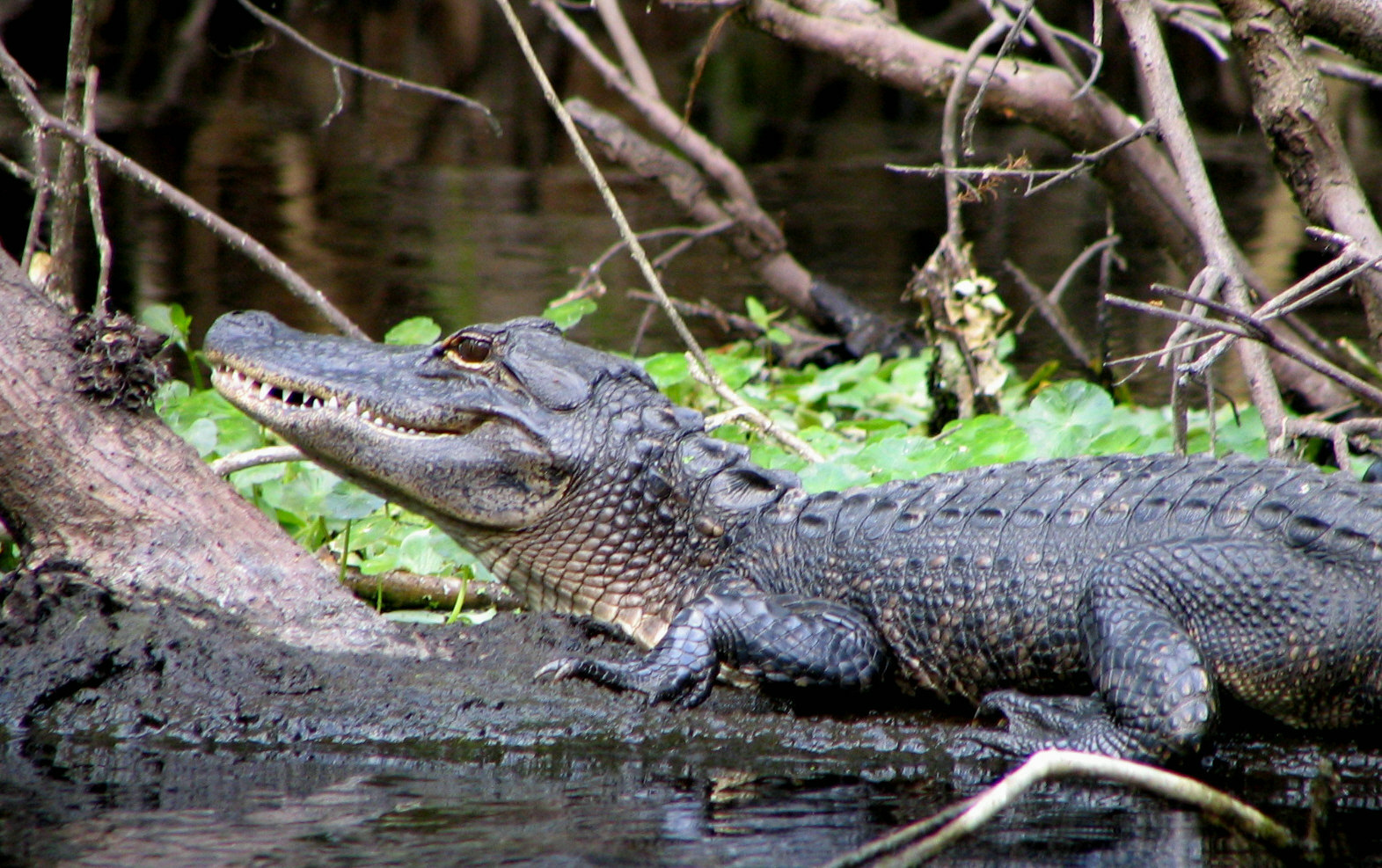
A young alligator near the spring run

== Administrative ==
Florida state parks are open between 8 a.m. and sundown every day of the year (including holidays). The nature center is open Saturday and Sunday from noon to 3:00 p.m. EST.
