= Sandra Stetson Aquatic Center =

Sports venue in DeLand, Florida

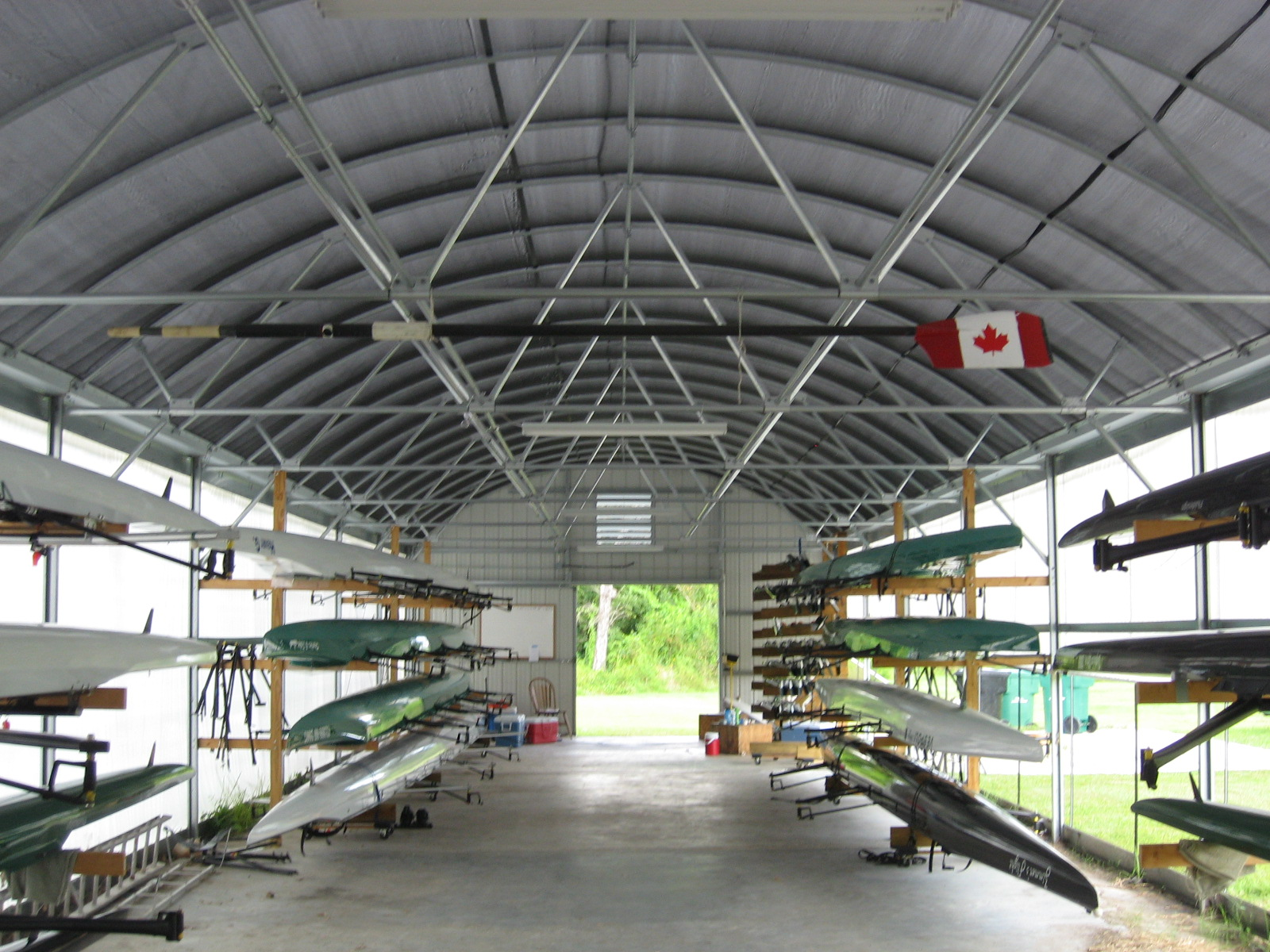
- Location: DeLand, Florida
- Coordinates: 28°59′22.16″N 81°20′48.54″W
- Home water: Lake Beresford
- Affiliations: Stetson Crew

Events
- Hatter Classic, Stetson Sprints

The Sandra Stetson Aquatic Center is a 10,000 square foot building and ten acre natural area located along Lake Beresford in DeLand, Florida. The facility is named in honor of Sandra Stetson, who provided a $6 million gift to support construction of the building and a botanical garden within the grounds. Sandra Stetson is the great granddaughter of famed hat-maker John B. Stetson, for whom Stetson University is named.

== Facilities ==
The first floor of the building is home to the Stetson University Crew who have many recent achievements including a Dad Vail medal in the Women's Varsity 4. The second floor of the facility houses laboratories, field offices, and a multi-purpose classroom for Stetson's Institute for Water and Environmental Resilience. The center has also served as a training site for both international and U.S. college crew teams, including the Canadian Women’s National Team.

The grounds of the Sandra Stetson Aquatic Center include a public park, restrooms, and canoe launch area funded through the Volusia County, FL ECHO Grant program. The site is also being developed into a botanical gardens themed on the 18th century travels of botanists John and William Bartram and for inclusion within a regional Bartram Trail. Significant public recreation areas and natural features such as Hontoon Island State Park, Blue Spring State Park, Lake Woodruff National Wildlife Refuge, and Ocala National Forest are located in close proximity to the facility along the St. Johns River.

The site features a boathouse for storage, as well as erg machines and coaches' launches. The lake itself is approximately two miles long and about half a mile wide. The St. Johns River flows through the lake making it rowable north to Jacksonville, Florida, (about 100 miles) or south to Melbourne, Florida, (about 200 miles). The lake is ideal for rowing; the water is protected and has no tidal action and minimal current. Central Florida provides perfect training conditions year round. During the training season it rarely rains. Average temperatures are 70–80 degrees for highs and 45–55 degrees for lows.
