= Louis P. Thursby House =

Historic house in Florida, United States

- U.S. National Register of Historic Places
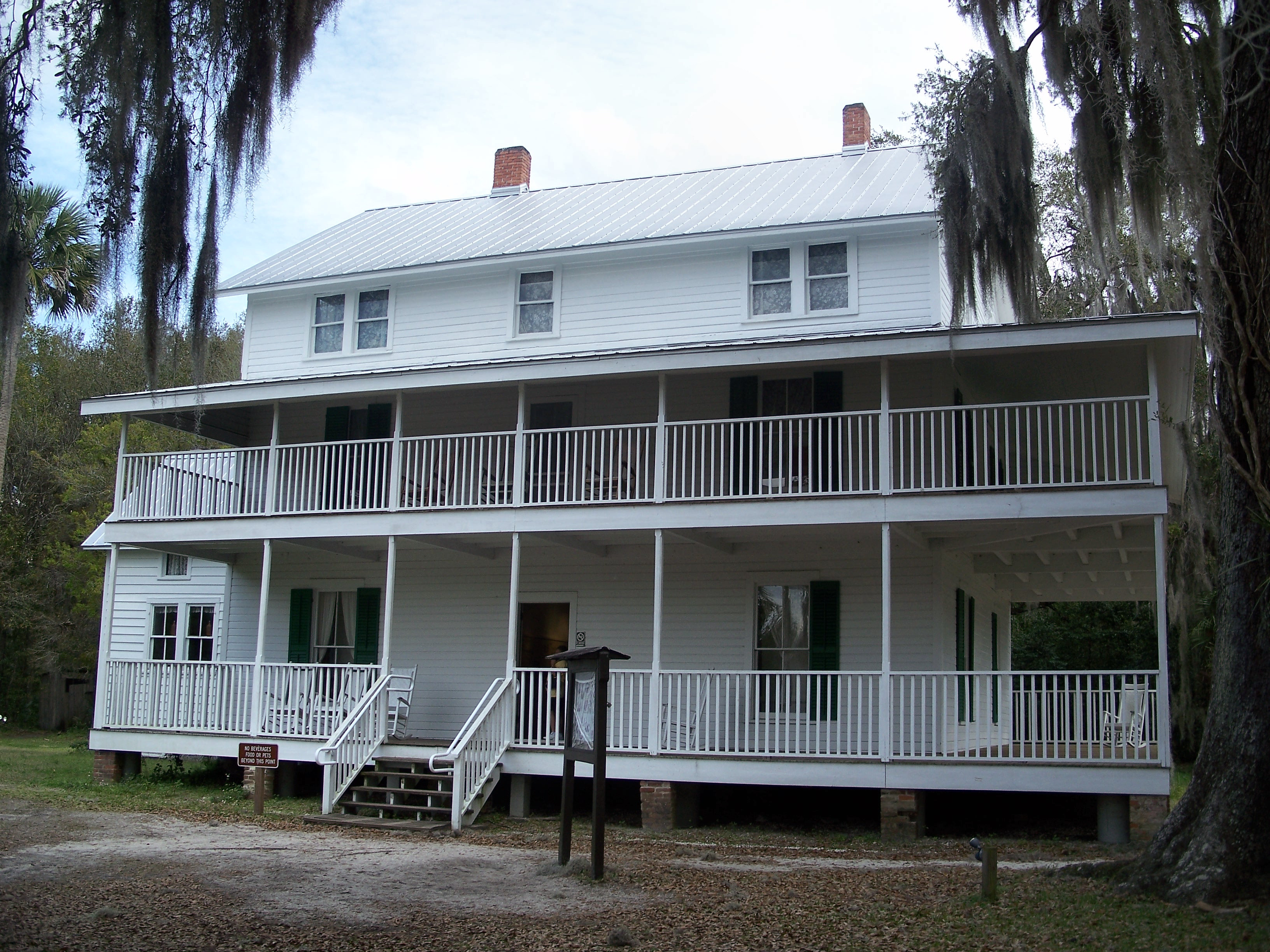

- Location within Volusia County
- Location: Orange City, Florida
- Coordinates: 28°56′36″N 81°20′25″W
- Built: 1872
- NRHP reference No.: 00000468
- Added to NRHP: May 11, 2000

The Thursby House located at Blue Spring State Park in Orange City, Florida, was constructed in 1872. The house was once a two-story structure built from three kinds of center-cut pine that had been milled in Savannah, Georgia, and transported by boat to the site.

Louis P. Thursby and his family settled on the inlet to Blue Springs, located on the St. Johns River, in 1856. Shortly after arriving, he constructed one of the first steamboat landings and planted one of the earliest orange groves on the upper St. Johns River. His initial residence was a log cabin that he built.

Thursby's son added a third story and kitchen wing in 1900, which is still standing today.

A cypress water tank stood near the northeast corner of the house. The tank has recently been removed from its supports.

The Louis P. Thursby House is a historic home in Orange City. It is located inside Blue Spring State Park. On May 11, 2000, it was added to the U.S. National Register of Historic Places.

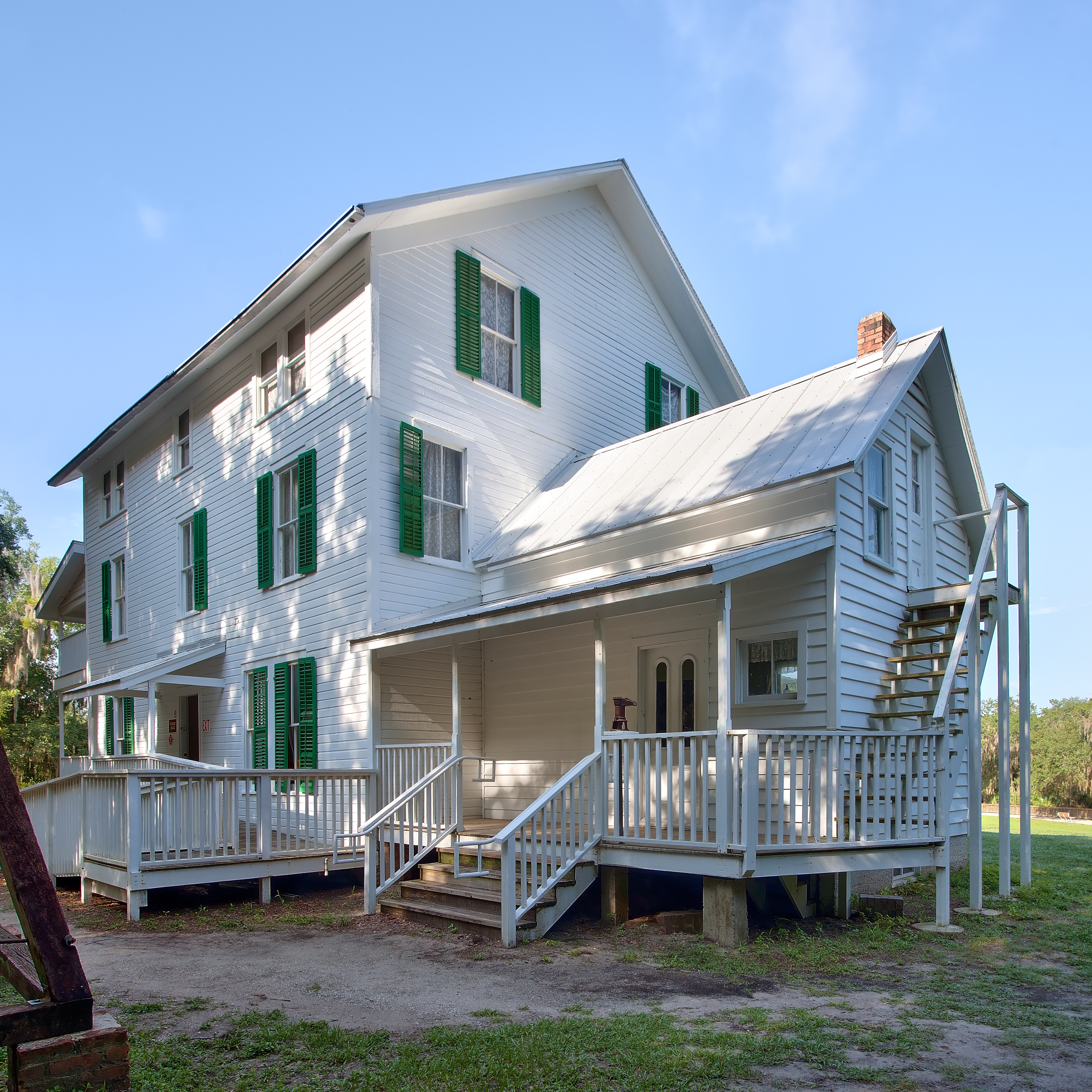
Exterior - northeast corner

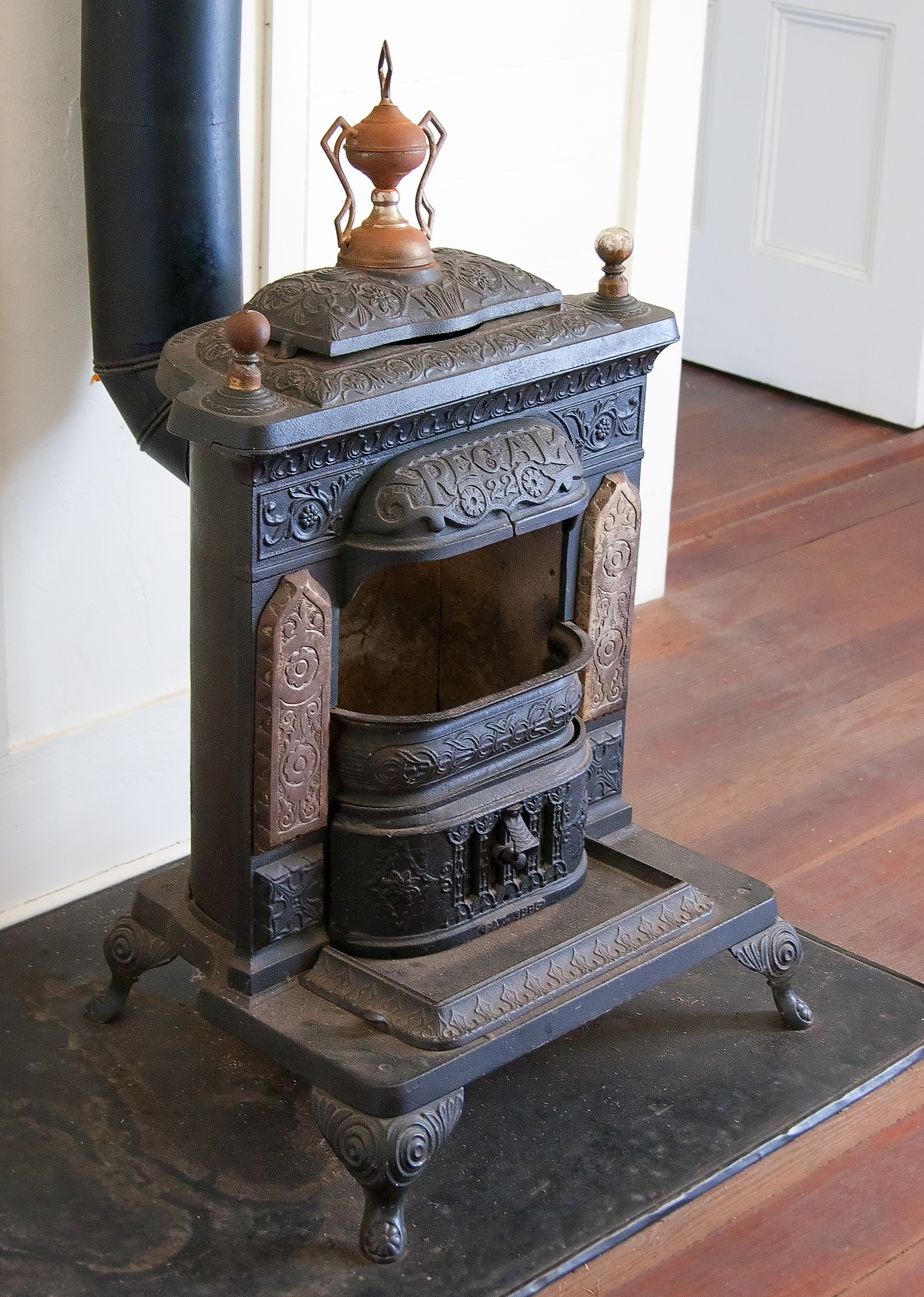
Woodburning stove

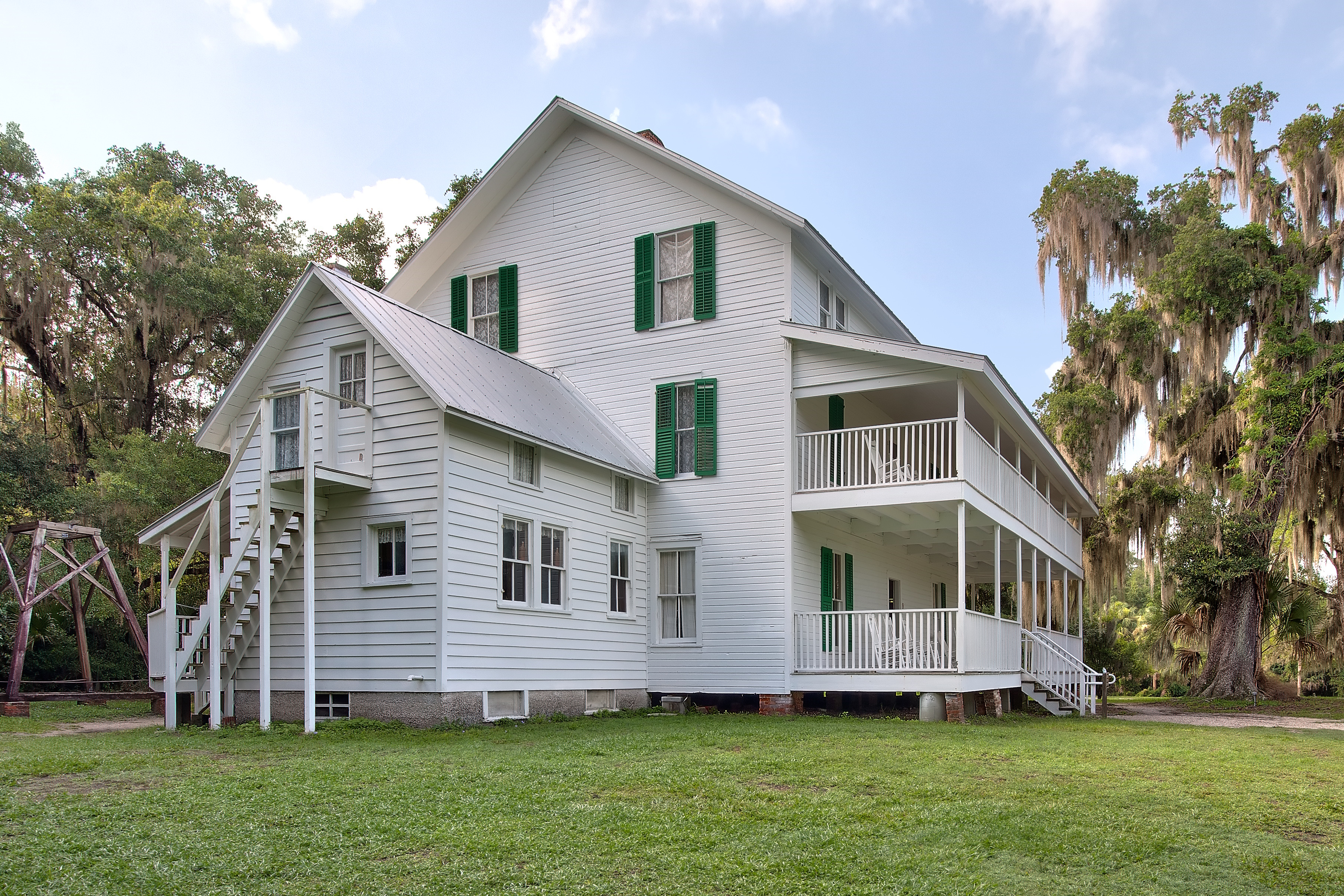
Exterior view

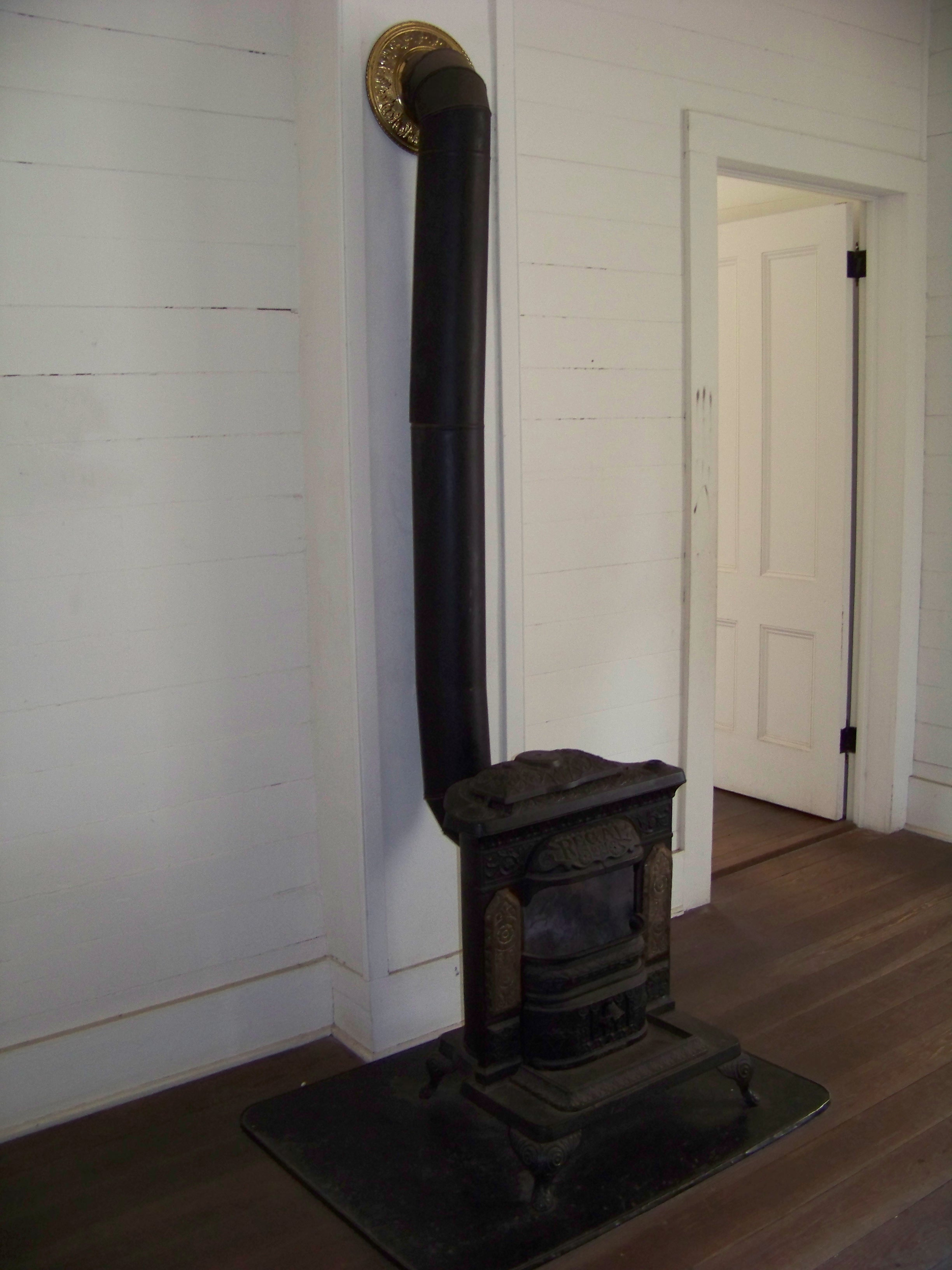
Vintage heating

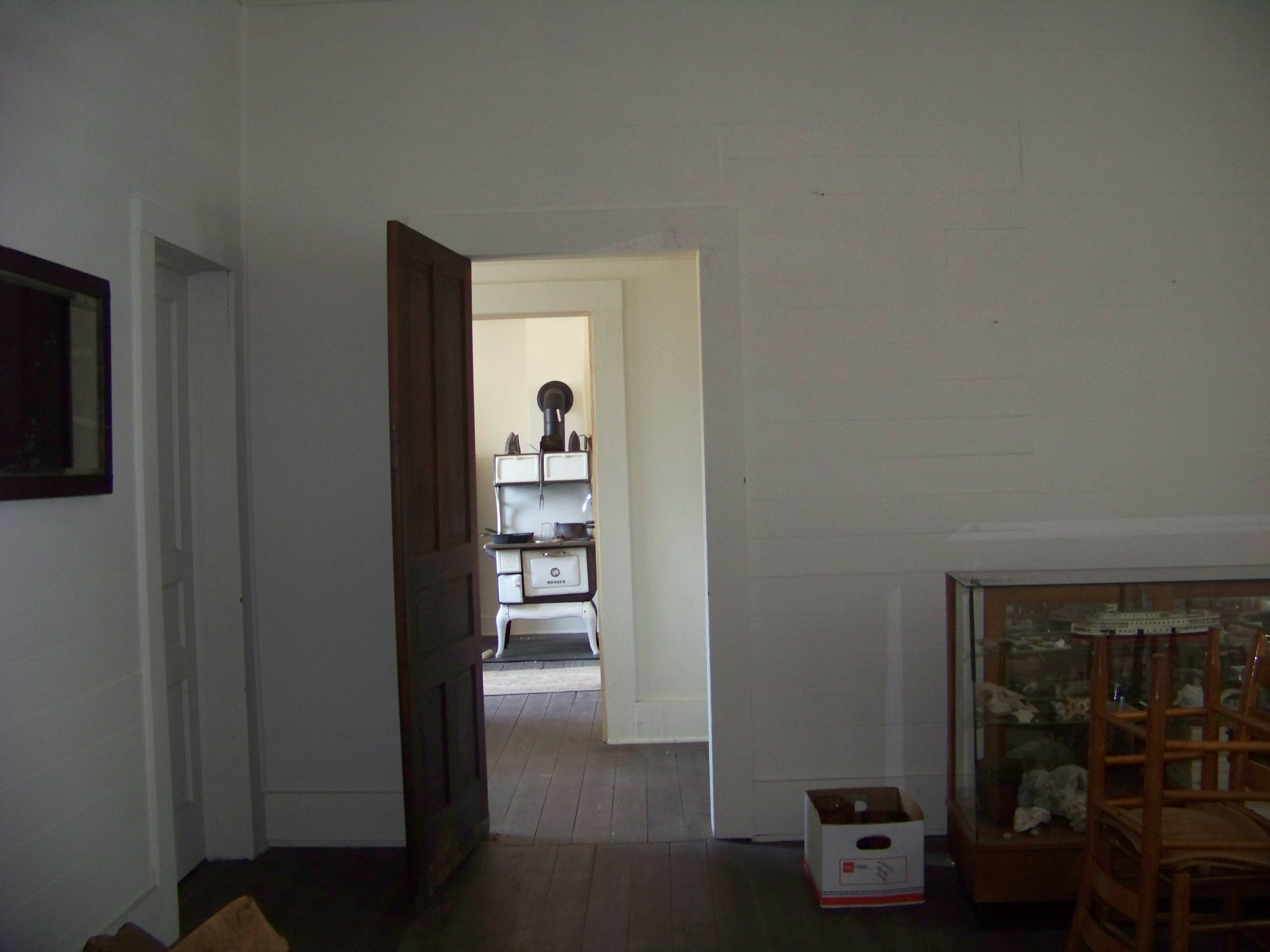
Glimpse of the kitchen
