= Hontoon Island State Park =

State park in Florida, United States

- IUCN category III (natural monument or feature)
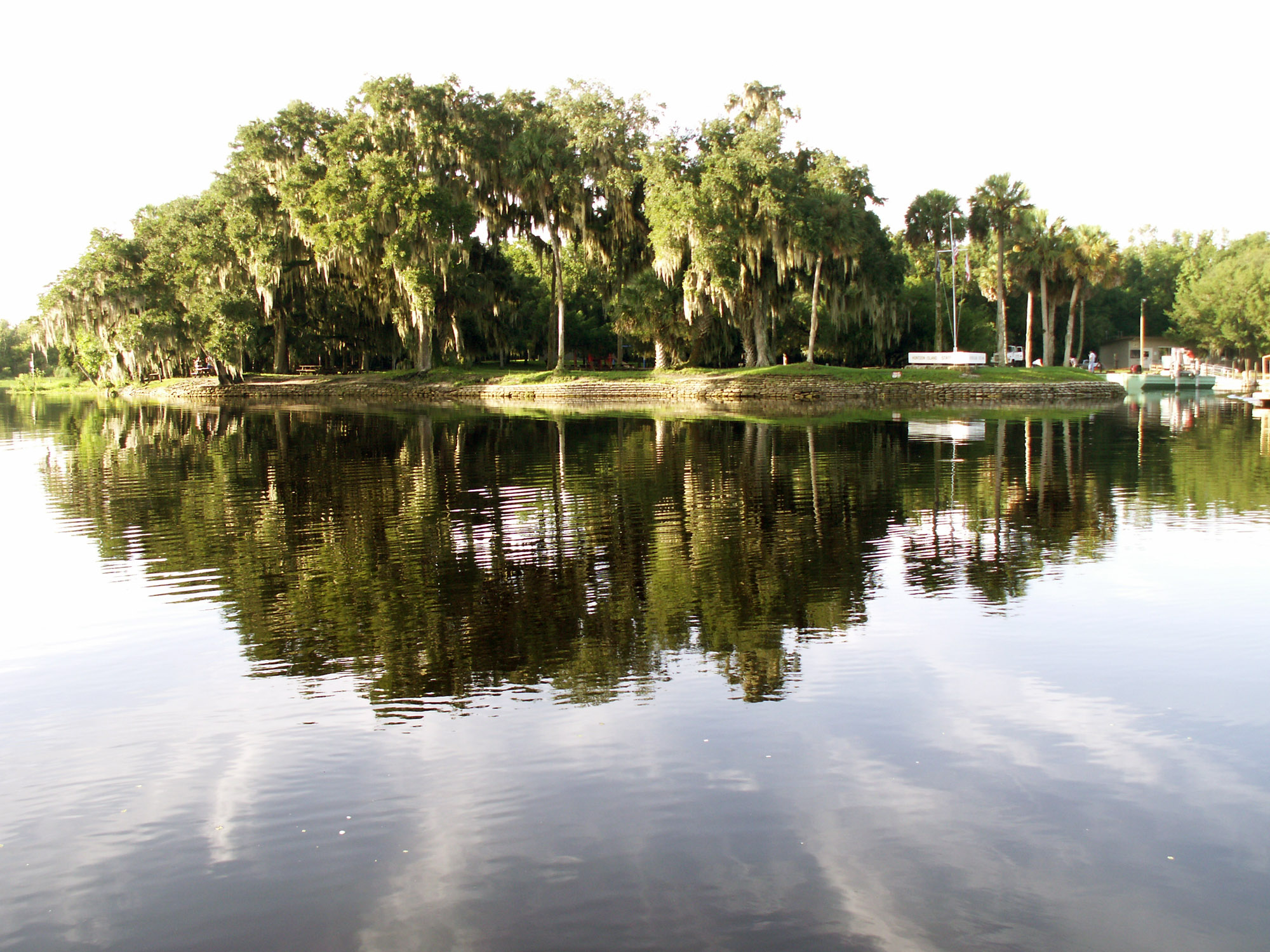
- Hontoon Island from the river

- Location within Florida Location within the United States
- Interactive map of Hontoon Island State Park
- Location: Volusia County, Florida, USA
- Nearest city: DeLand, Florida
- Coordinates: 28°58′01″N 81°21′47″W
- Area: 1,648 acres (6.67 km^{2})
- Governing body: Florida Department of Environmental Protection

Hontoon Island State Park is a 1,648-acre (6.67 km^{2}) Florida State Park located on Hontoon Island between the St. Johns River and the Hontoon Dead River in Volusia County. It is six miles (10 km) west of DeLand, off SR 44, and can only be reached by boat or park-operated passenger ferry. No motorized vehicles, other than wheelchairs, are allowed to be brought onto the island and there is no swimming. The island has pine flatwoods, palm and oak hammocks, bald cypress swamps and marshes. Hontoon Island is surrounded by the St. Johns River, the Hontoon Dead River, and Snake Creek.

Activities include horseshoes, cycling, boating, canoeing, kayaking, and fishing, as well as hiking, camping, picnicking, and nature viewing and photography. The island can be circumnavigated with a nine and a half-mile (14 km) day trip; Blue Spring State Park is a short paddle up the St. Johns (3.5 miles) one way. Amenities include canoe rentals, bike paths, eleven tent sites and six rustic cabins. The park also has overnight boat slip rentals, playground equipment, picnic tables, and a 3.4-mile (5.5 km) nature trail. The park has a lending library with picture books for children aged four to nine. The park is open from 8:00 am till one hour before sunset year-round.

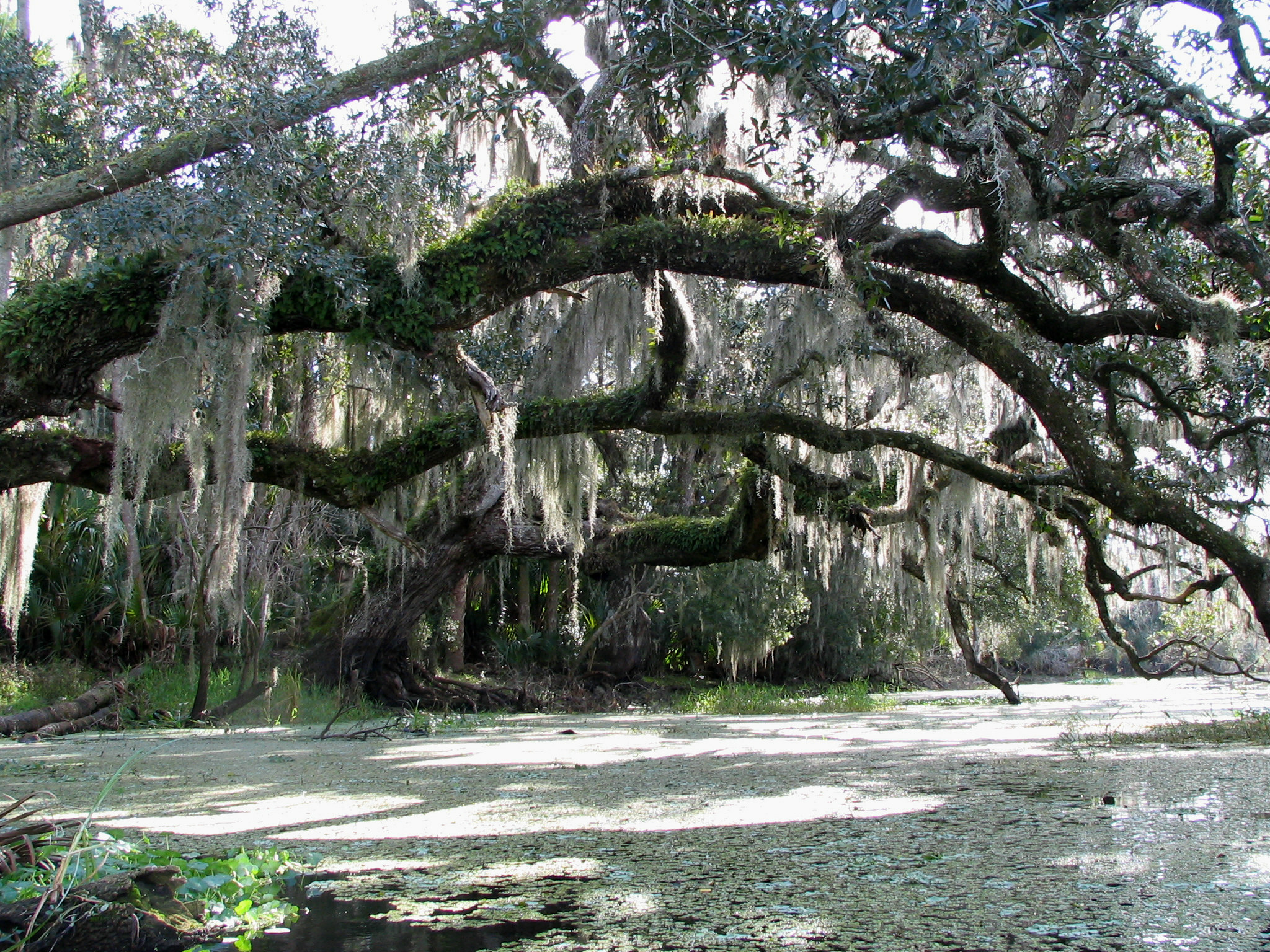
Snake Creek, which forms the southern boundary of the island

== Rentals ==
Bicycle rentals are $6 per hour or $15 all day. Canoe and kayak rentals are $20 for up to four hours and $40 all day. All rentals must be returned by 5 p.m. There are no refunds for inclement weather. Tent sites and marina slips rent for $18 per night. Four-person cabins rent for $30 per night and six-person cabins rent for $35 per night.

The Mayacan Indians were the first inhabitants of Hontoon Island. The Hammock Hiking Nature Trail leads to an ancient shell mound on a 3-mile (4.8 km) round trip.

== Wildlife gallery ==
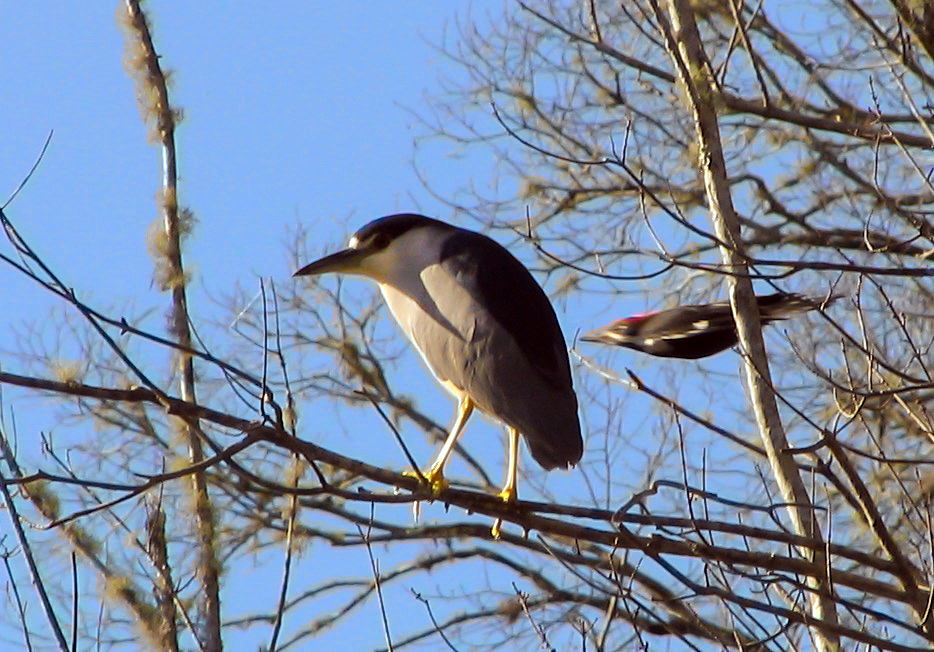
Black-crowned night heron and pileated woodpecker

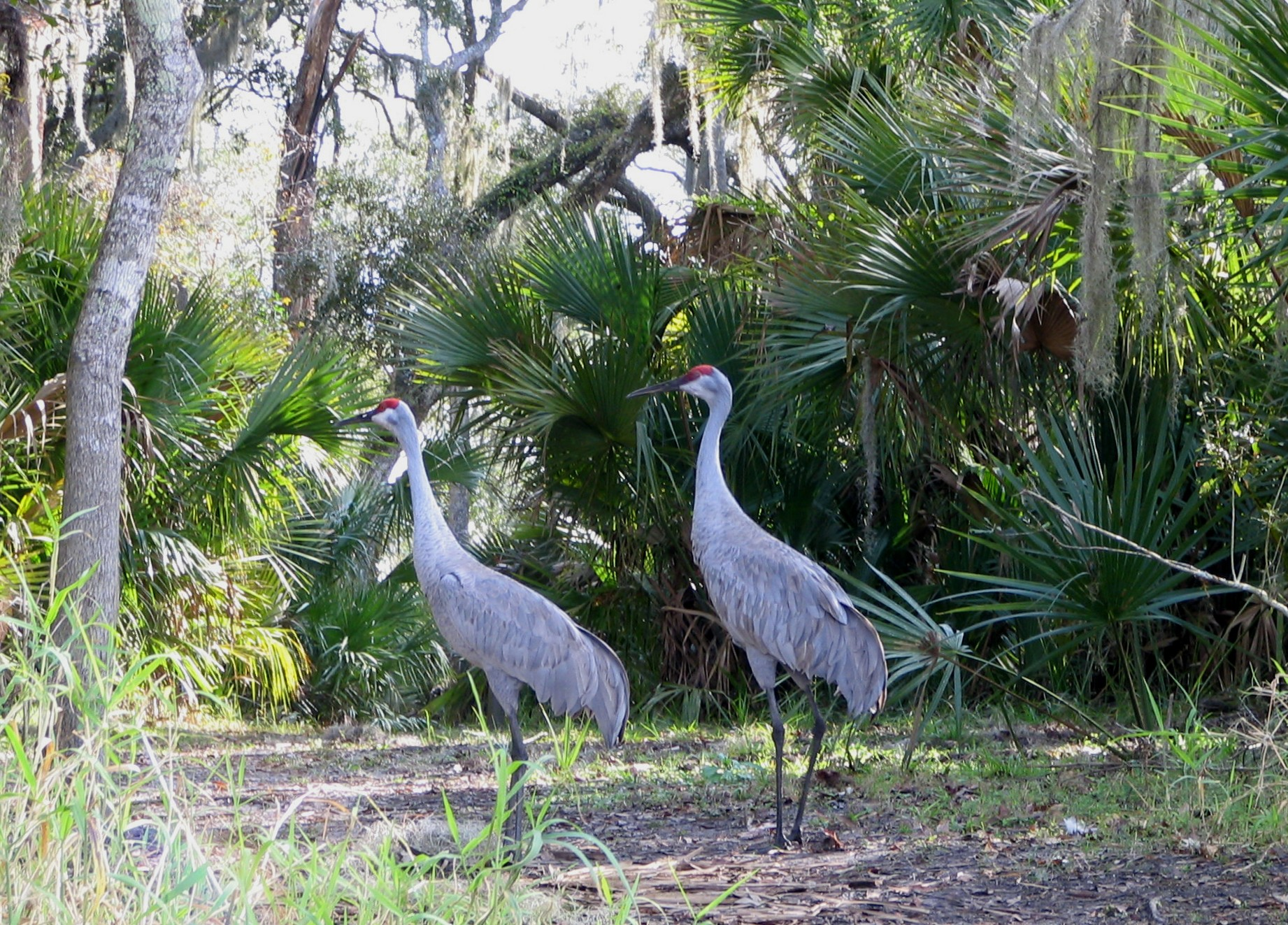
Sandhill cranes on Hontoon Island

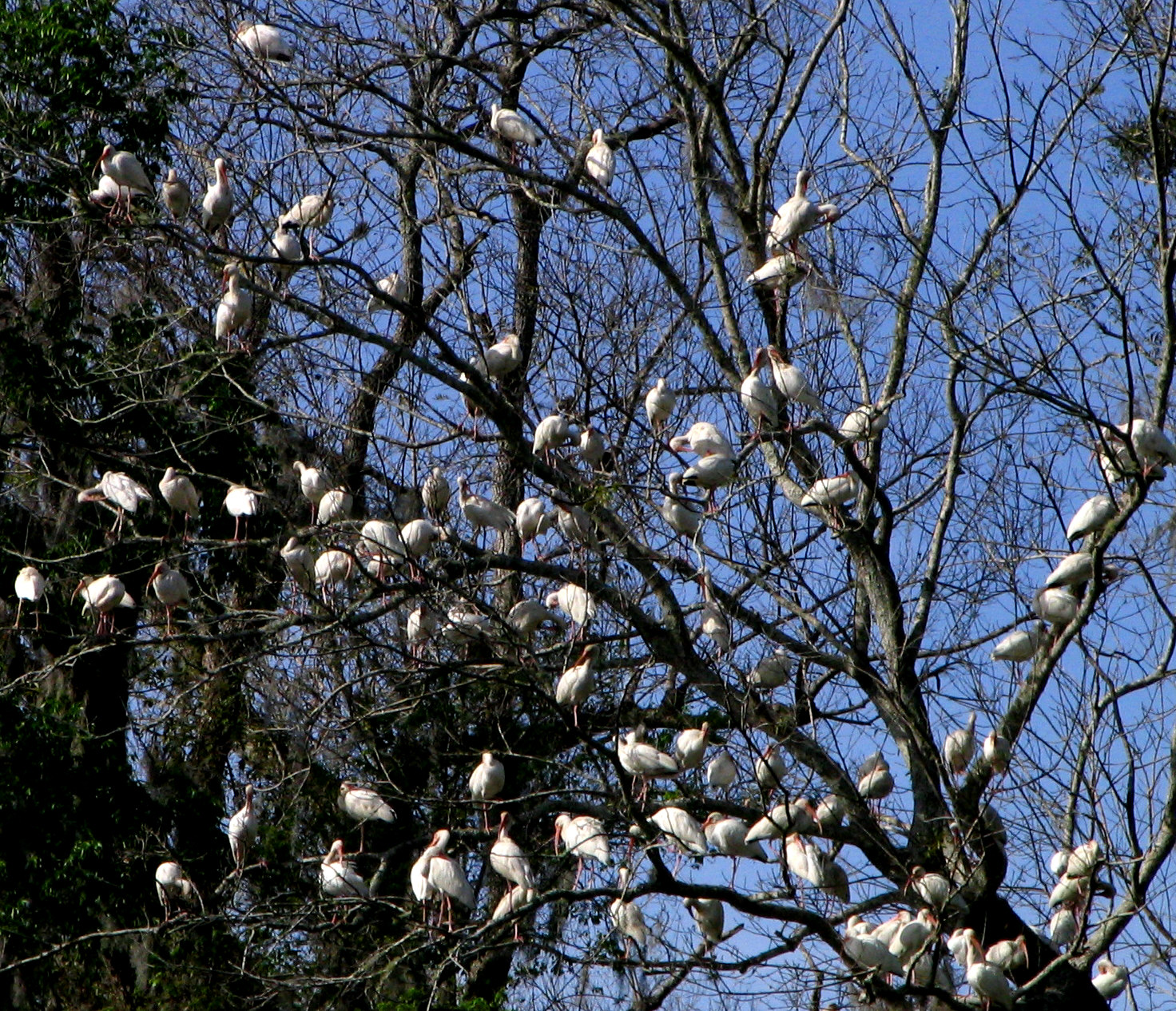
A tree full of American white ibis on the St. Johns.

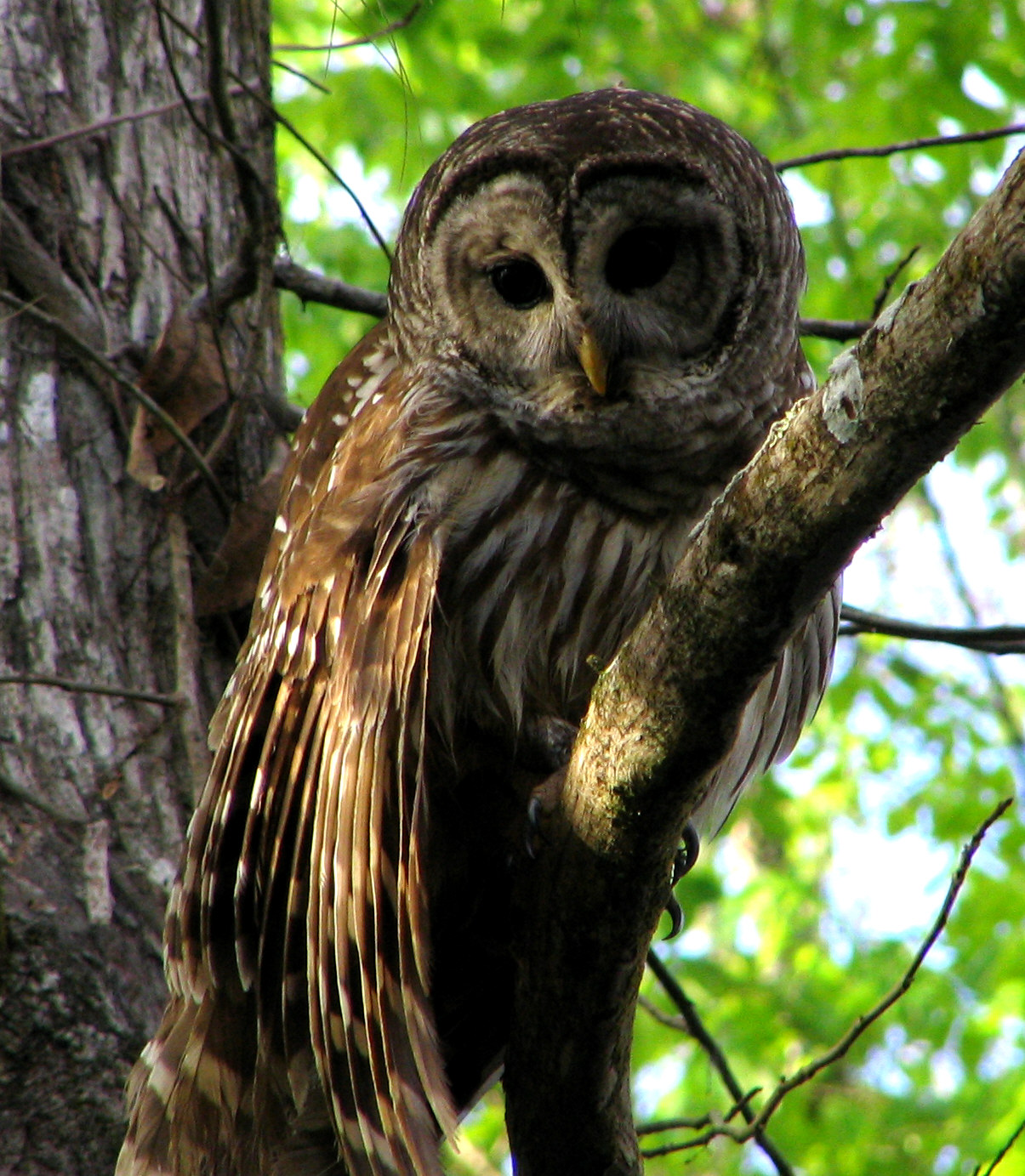
A Barred owl near Hontoon Island.

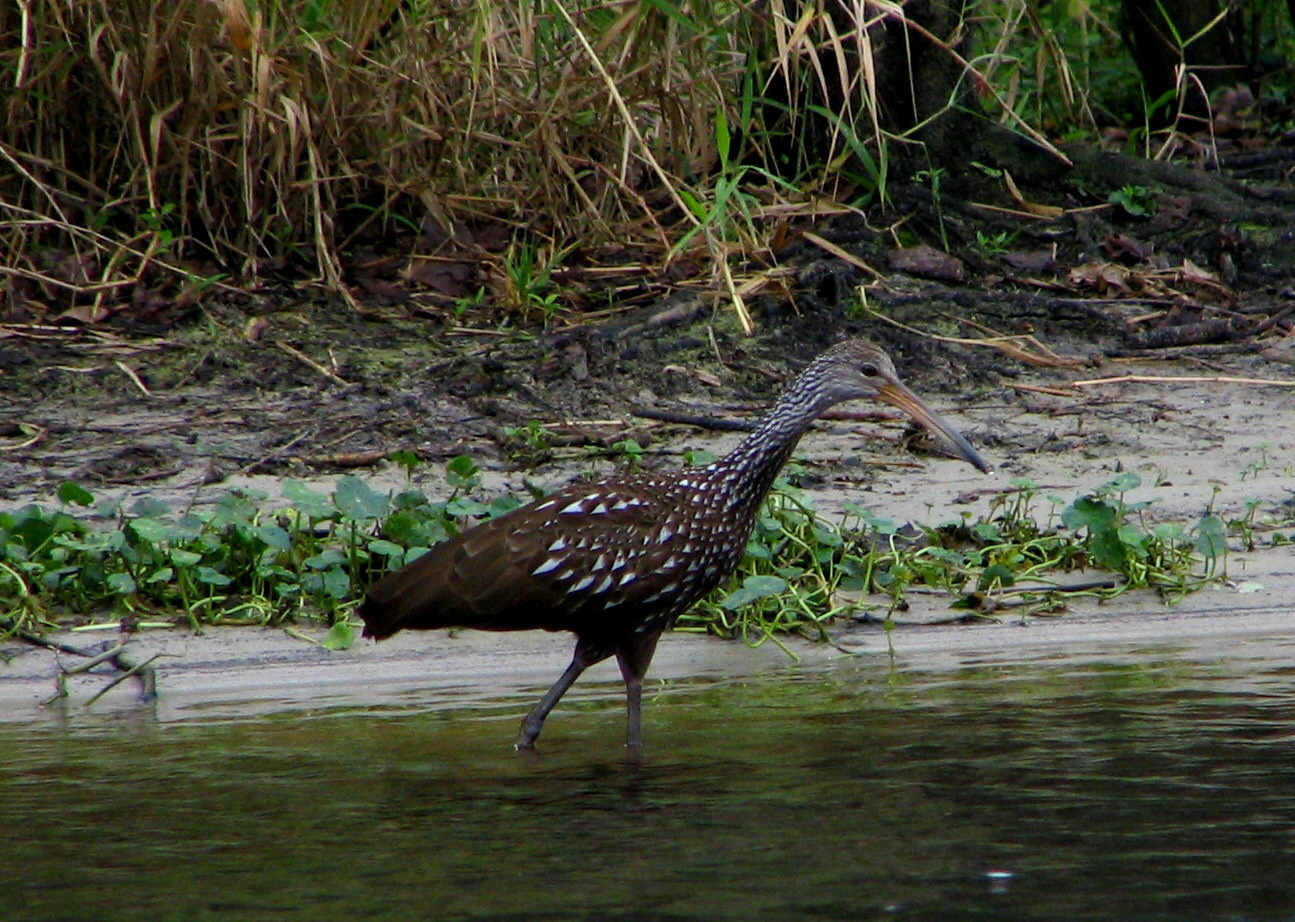
Limpkin on the St. Johns River.

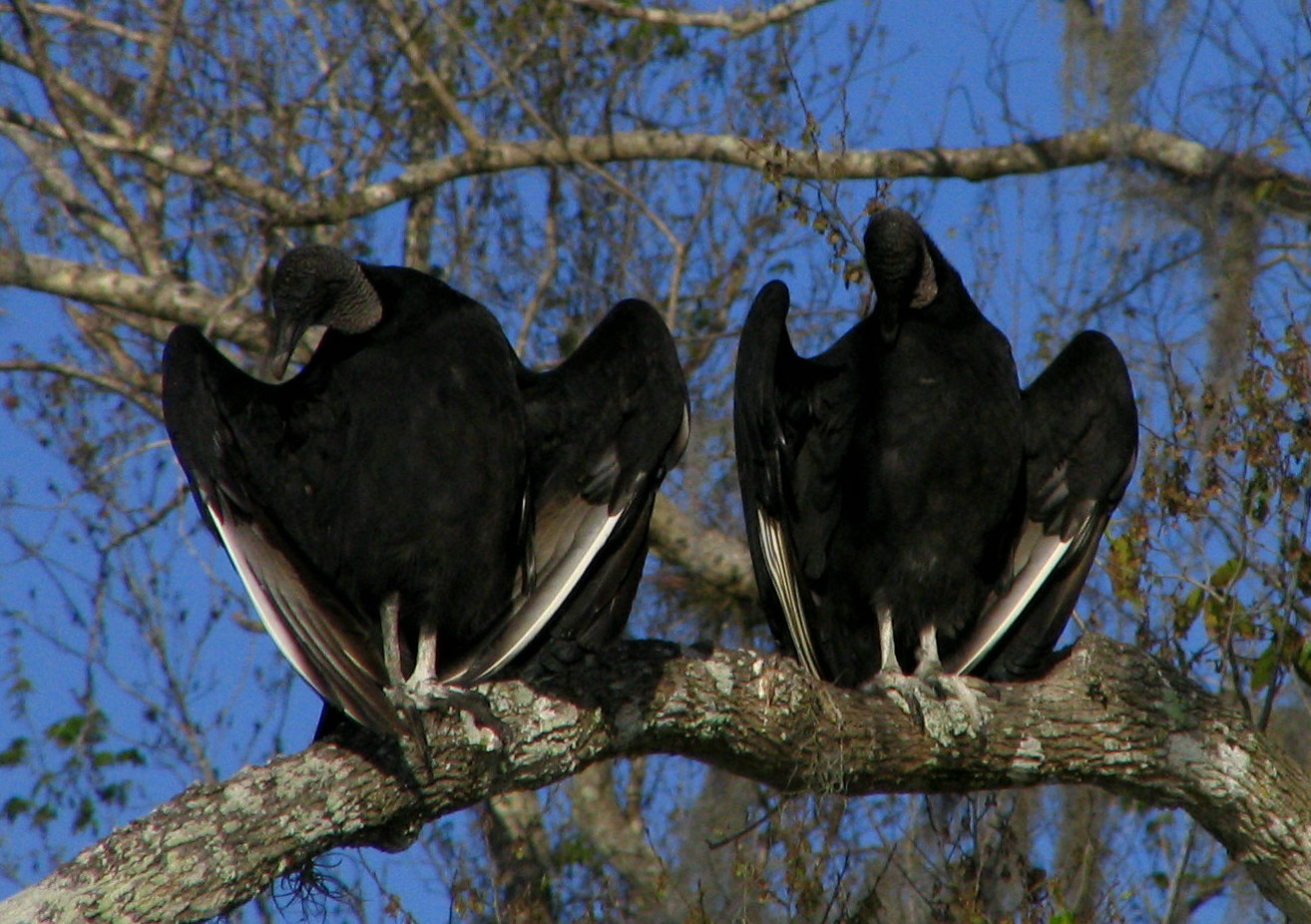
American black vultures.

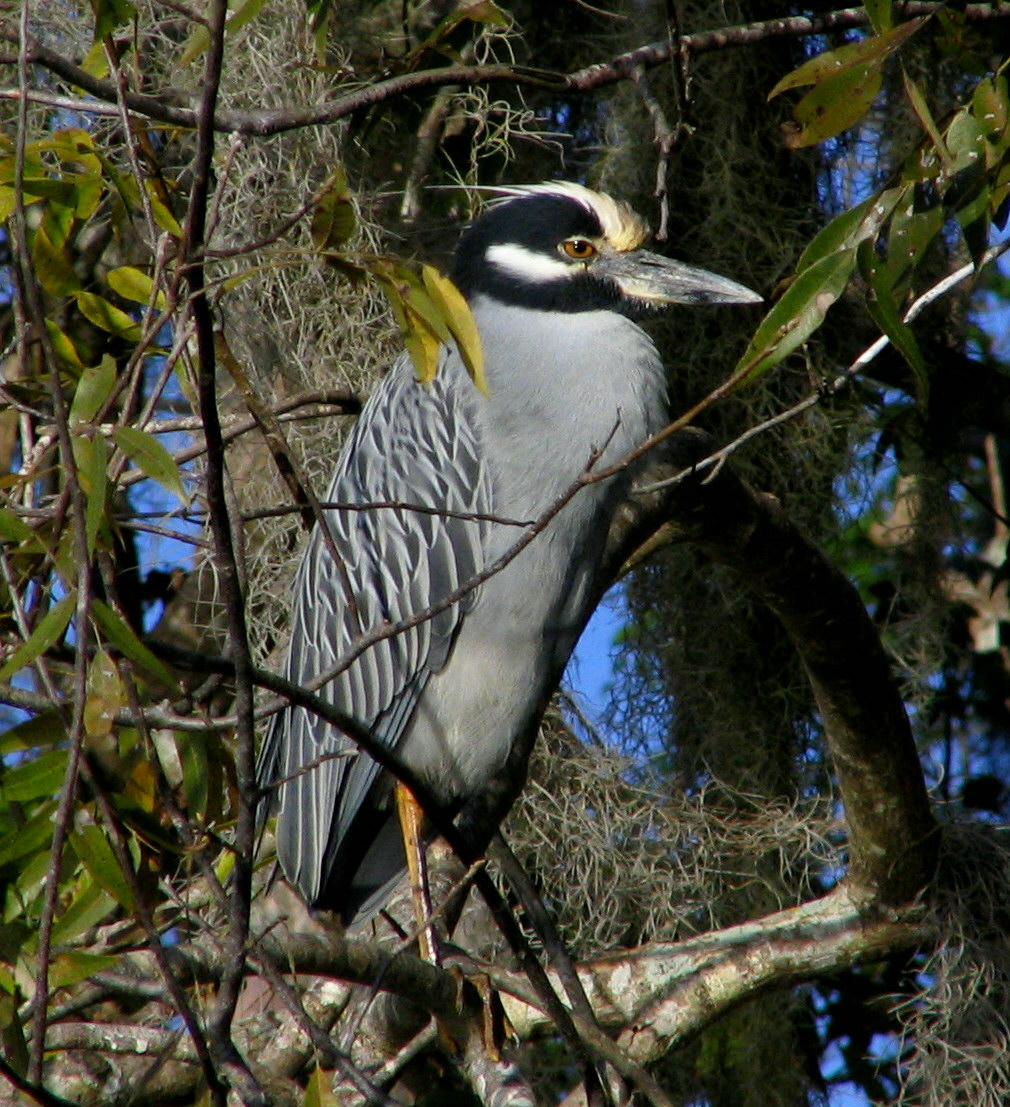
Yellow-crowned night heron.

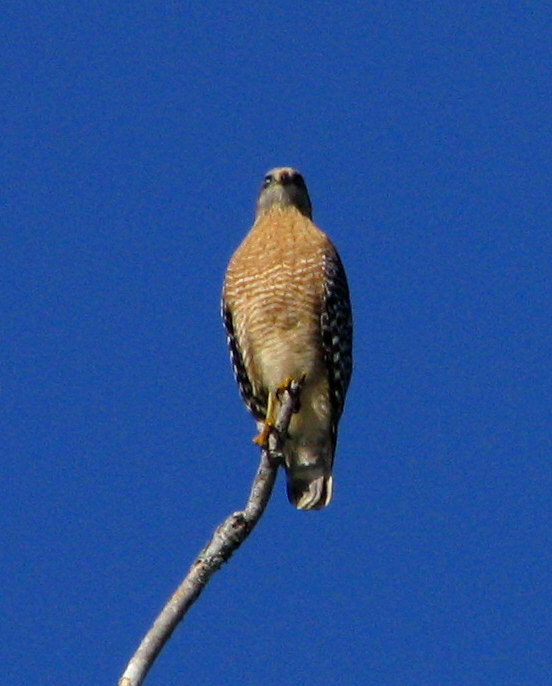
Red-shouldered hawk, Florida sub-species.

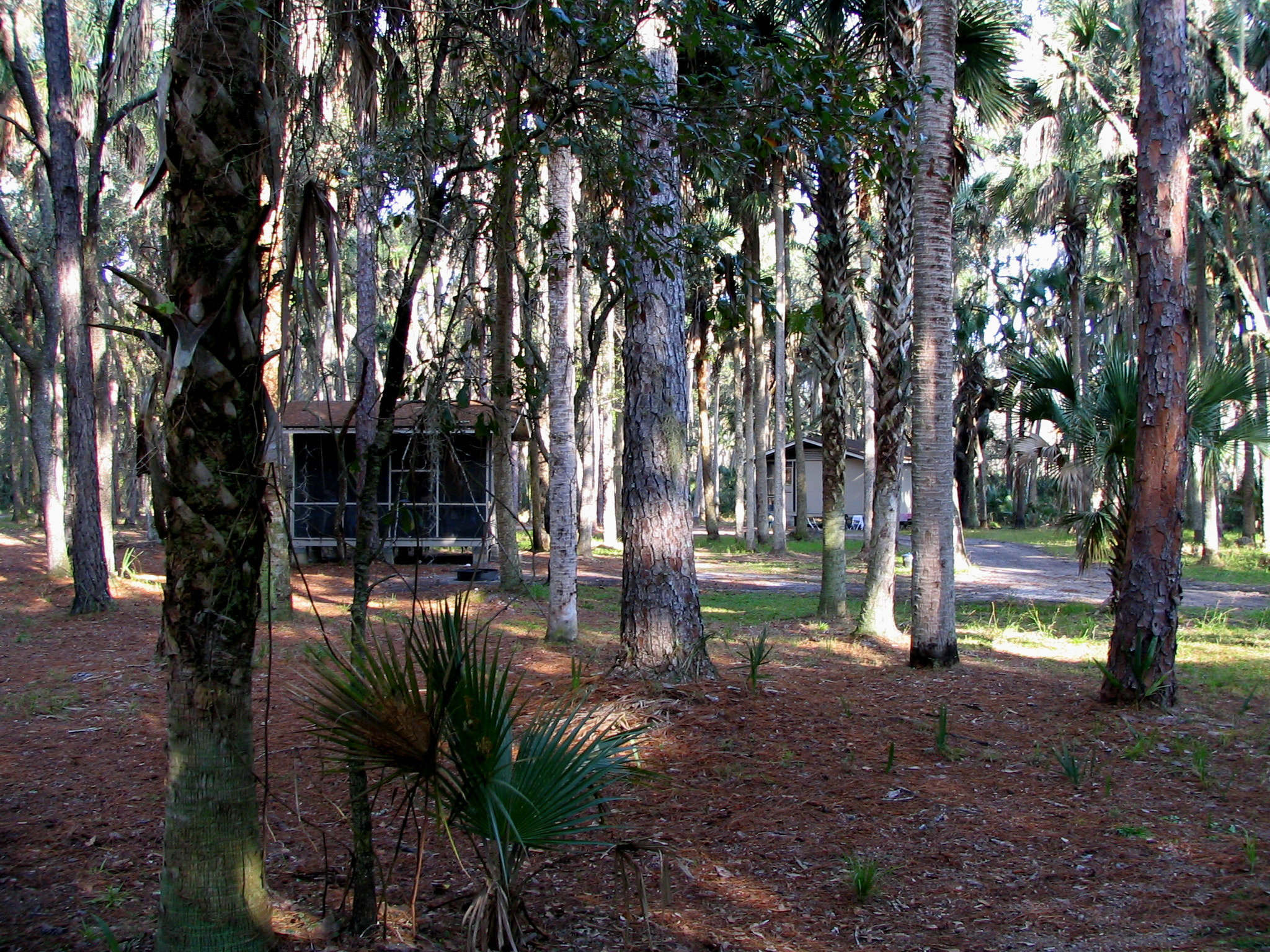
Primitive cabins may be rented at the park

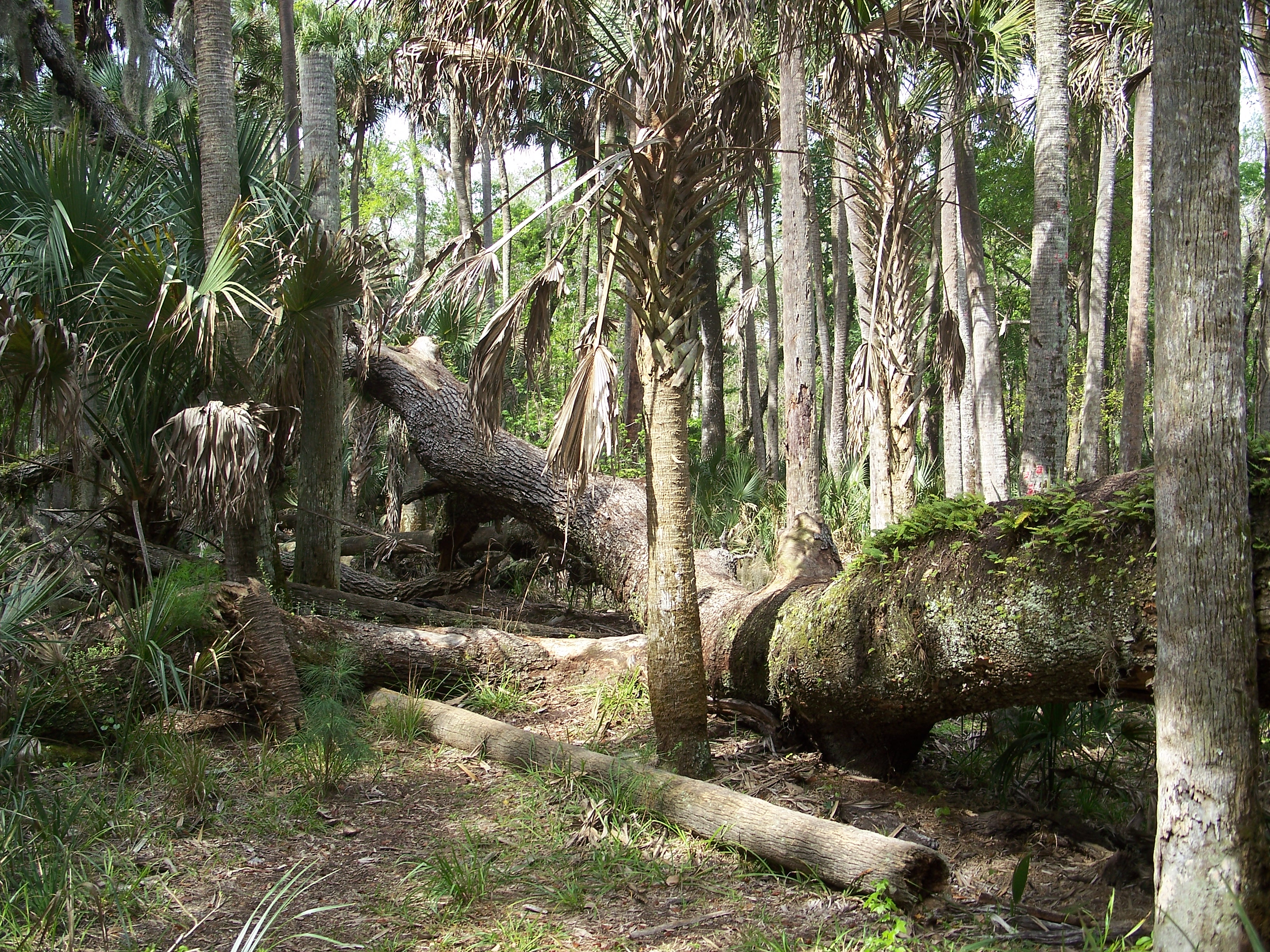
Fallen tree

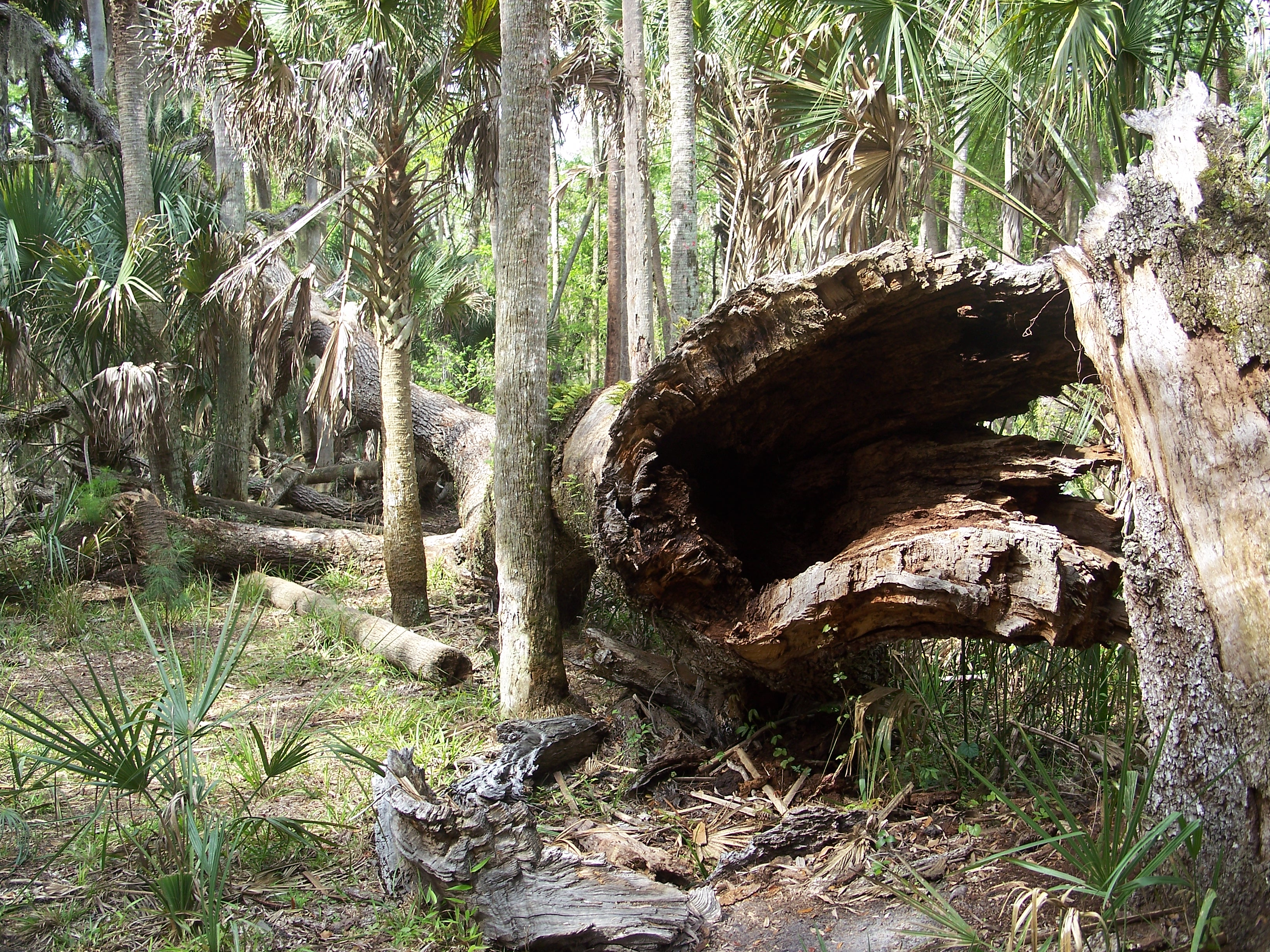
Another view of the fallen tree

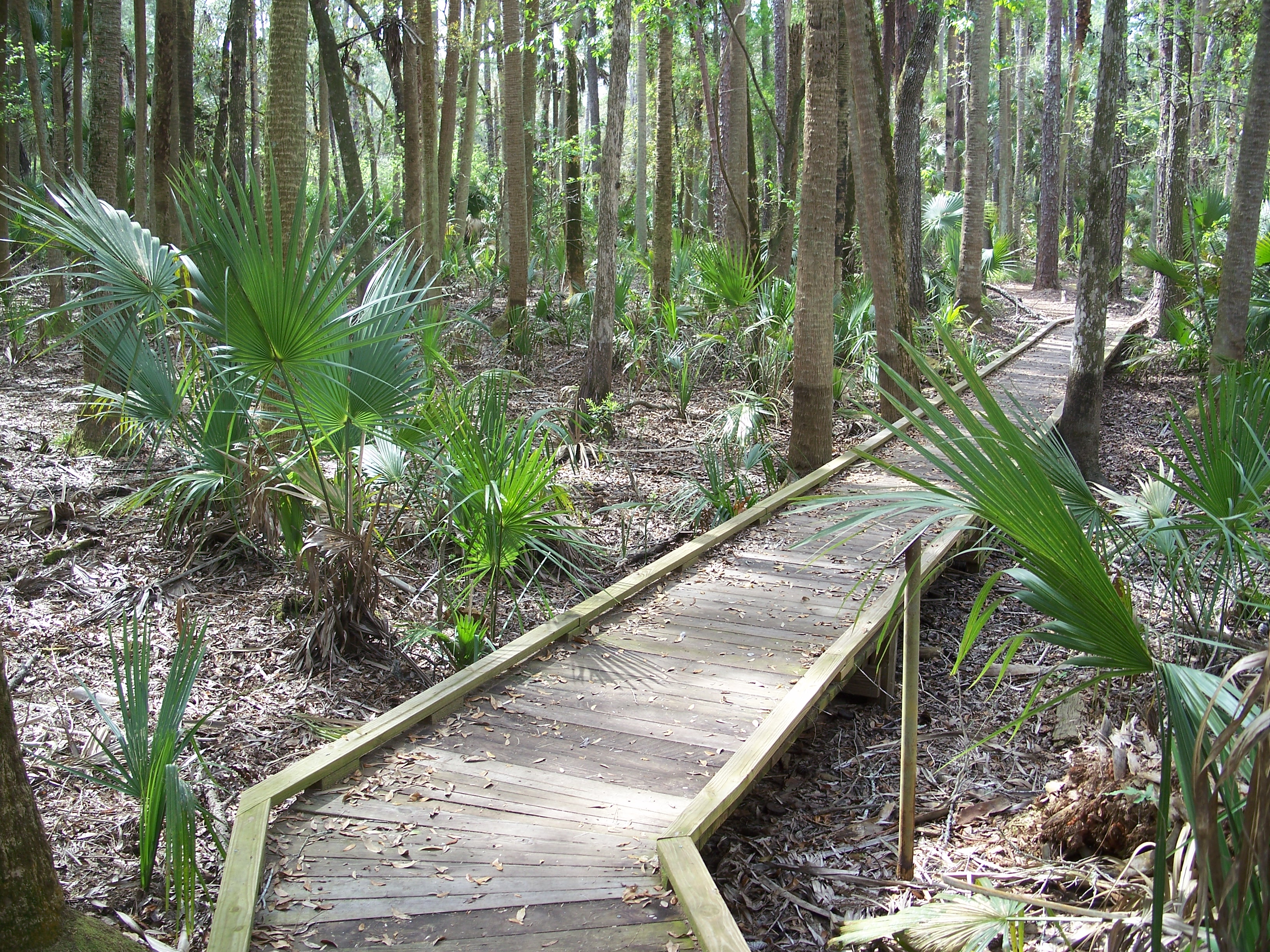
Boardwalks protect the fragile soil
