= Blue Spring State Park =

State park in Volusia County, Florida, US

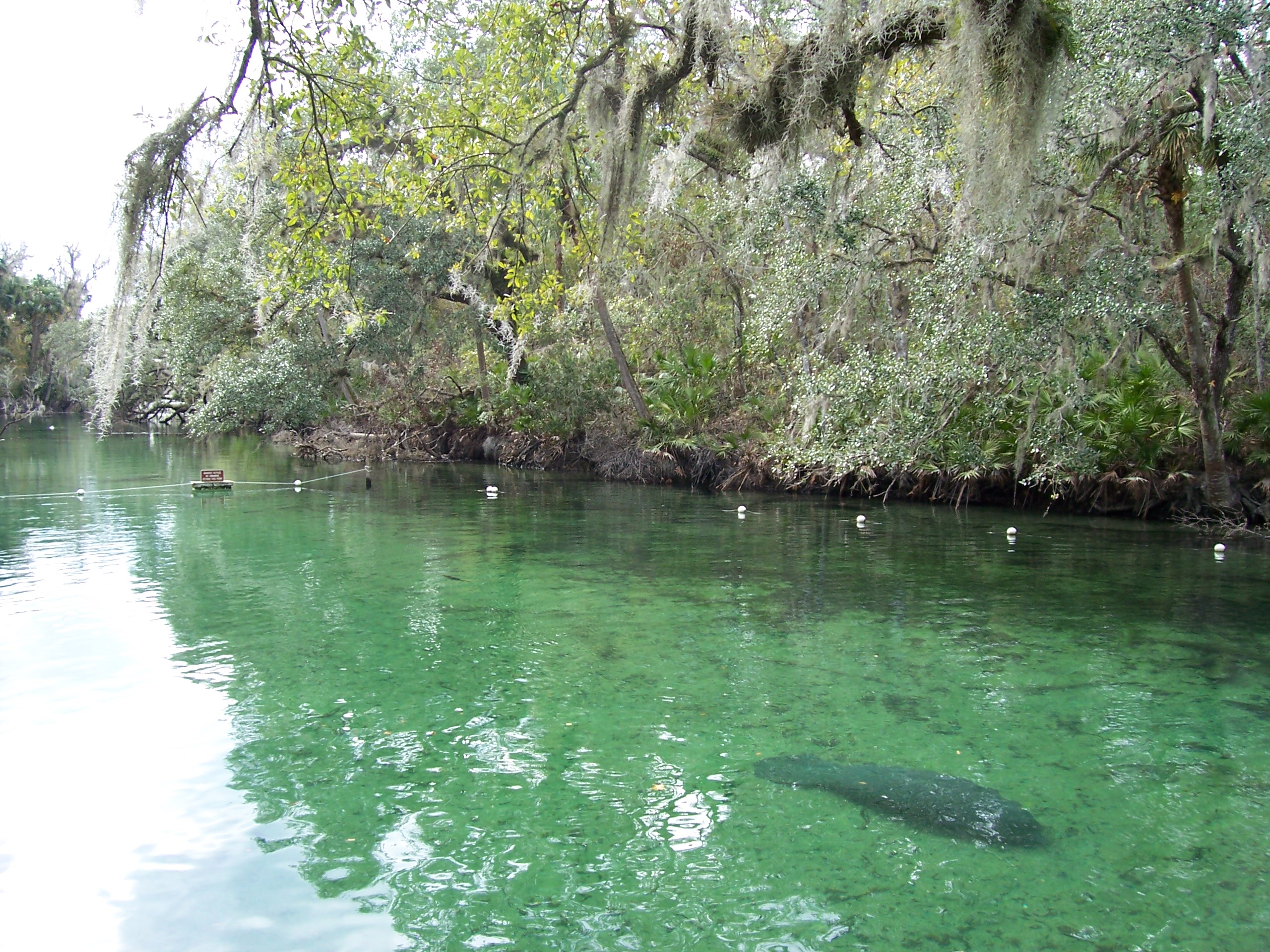
- A manatee in Blue Spring Run

- Location within Florida Location within the United States
- Interactive map of Blue Spring State Park
- Location: Volusia County, Florida, United States
- Nearest city: Orange City
- Coordinates: 28°56′53″N 81°20′24″W
- Area: 2,659.05 acres (1,076.08 ha)
- Established: August 14, 1972; 54 years ago
- Visitors: 575,769 (in FY 2022–23)
- Governing body: Florida Department of Environmental Protection

Blue Spring State Park is a Florida state park located west of Orange City, Florida, in the United States. The park is a popular tourist destination; available activities include canoeing, scuba diving, kayaking, fishing, camping, hiking, wildlife watching, and swimming. The spring in the park (Volusia Blue Spring) is the largest on the St. Johns River. Due to its relatively warm temperature of 73 °F (23 °C), the spring attracts many Florida manatees during the winter. About 102 million US gallons (390,000 m^{3}) of water flow out of Blue Spring into the St. Johns River every day.

== History ==
=== Early accounts and settlement ===
While Britain held East Florida (1763–1784), the spring lay at the southern end of Beresford Plantation. The 20,000-acre (8,100 ha) grant to the Earl of Tyrone ran south from Lake Beresford to Blue Spring Landing, which a survey of the river made around 1774 marks as "Mineral Spring". The estate's agent, Charles Bernard, began developing it in the late 1760s, with its dwellings and most of its fields on the east shore of Lake Beresford. According to the park's management plan, part of the estate's indigo and sugarcane lay on what is now the park's northern Starke Tract. In 1782 the Loyalist refugee William Moss bought 1,200 acres (490 ha) of the estate together with nearby Hontoon Island. He abandoned them two years later, when Britain ceded East Florida to Spain and its settlers were evacuated.

The naturalists John and William Bartram both visited the spring. William Bartram reached the plantation in 1774, shortly after a hurricane had wrecked most of its buildings and crops, and was taken from there to see the spring. In his Travels (1791) he described a circular basin large enough for several small boats, from which a run deep enough for a sloop flowed 300 to 400 yards (270 to 370 m) to the river. He reported clear water crowded with fish, alligators and gar, a "brassy and vitriolic" taste, a sulfurous smell, and an orange grove of magnolias, oaks and palms around the basin. He also noted that fish moved into such springs in winter.

In 1803 Spain granted 1,000 acres (400 ha) that took in the spring and the upper half of its run to Francis P. Fatio Jr., who never lived there. Captain John W. Starke bought Fatio's grant in 1851 and planted a citrus grove, which stayed in production until 1985.

=== Thursby House ===
Louis P. Thursby, a native of Brooklyn who had served in the Mexican–American War and joined the California Gold Rush, arrived at Blue Spring in 1856. He bought 133 acres (54 ha) from Samuel Parson, the first white settler there, and moved his family into Parson's log cabin. The family owned the lower half of the spring run, and Starke owned the spring and the upper half. Thursby was imprisoned by Union forces during the Civil War. Accounts differ on whether he was held as a suspected Confederate sympathizer or because he owned four or five slaves.

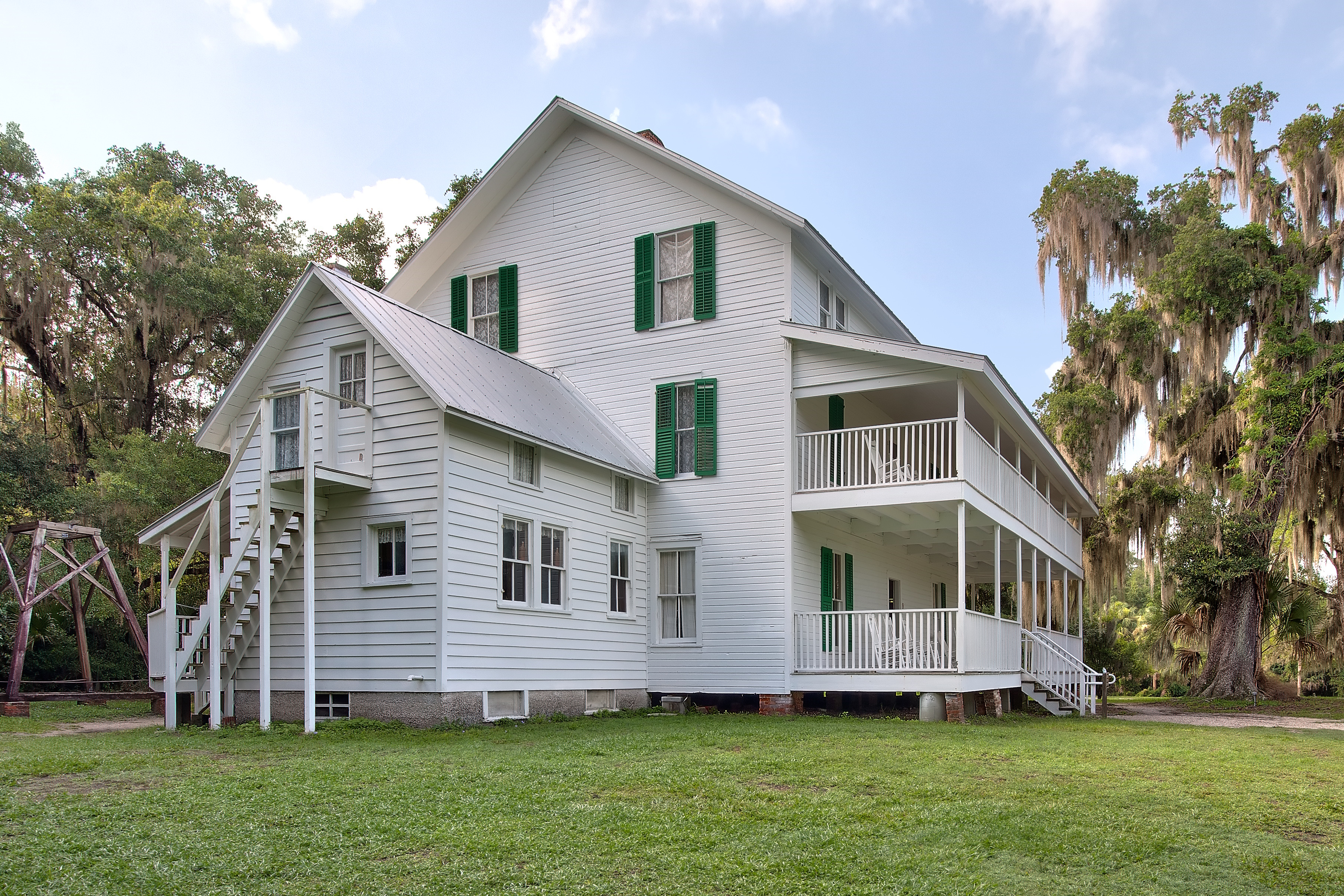
The Thursby House, built in 1872 on a shell midden

By 1868 Thursby was running a steamboat landing on the river, and Blue Spring became a regular mail stop with his wife Mary as postmistress. In 1872 he built a two-story frame house on top of the shell midden at the mouth of the run, presumably because it was the nearest high ground safe from floods. Northern investors platted the land to the east in the 1870s, and Blue Spring Landing became the arrival point for many of the settlers who founded Orange City in 1875. Nine steamboats eventually called there on regular routes, carrying freight, mail, tourists and sportsmen.

=== Railroads, bottled water and resort ===
In 1881 a narrow-gauge railroad, the first in the county, was laid from Orange City to the landing. Mules hauled a wooden flatcar of citrus to a pasture on Thursby's land, and the car then rolled downhill to the wharf. The line, built partly of midden shell, was extended to New Smyrna in 1887 as the Blue Spring, Orange City and Atlantic Railroad and became part of the Florida East Coast Railway in 1896. Its paved-over bed is now Magnolia Avenue. The Orange City Mineral Spring Company began bottling water from a well on what is now park land in 1891. The well supplied a succession of bottlers until 2003.

Thursby died in 1890. His son John later added a third story to the house, which was rented as rooms to travelers and sportsmen. (Note: The NRHP nomination dates the third story to between 1900 and 1910. The 2005 management plan dates it to about 1890 and a kitchen addition to about 1909.) From the 1930s the property was marketed for outdoor recreation. After the Thursbys sold it, Homer Smith ran it as a park and fish camp, followed by Gordon Pierson, who added cabins, boat rentals and concessions. In 1969 Pierson sold the land to Keystone Enterprises, which planned a resort with a campground, pool and bathhouses. The development failed, and the land reverted to the Pierson family.

=== State park ===
In 1971 the Cousteau television series filmed an episode on manatees, "The Forgotten Mermaids", at Blue Spring. The Florida Park Service credits the film with drawing attention to the spring as a winter refuge and with strongly influencing the state's decision to buy it. On August 14, 1972, the state's Board of Trustees of the Internal Improvement Trust Fund made the first purchase for the park: about 300 acres (120 ha) bought from the Pierson family, together with the spring itself. In November the trustees leased the land for 99 years to the Division of Recreation and Parks, then part of the Department of Natural Resources; the lease runs to 2071. At the time of purchase, swimmers had badly eroded and littered the spring run.

The park grew through later purchases in 1974 and 1978, and in 1988 Volusia County deeded about 870 acres (350 ha) to the state. A deed in the park's title history requires French Avenue and its boat ramp to stay open around the clock and free of charge until the state improves them. If the state charges admission or cuts their hours without making those improvements, the property reverts to the county. The Florida Manatee Sanctuary Act of 1978 gave legal protection to the manatees at Blue Spring and other refuges.

The Thursby House was a residence until 1981. The park service decided to restore it to its 1915 appearance and opened it as a house museum in 1982. It closed in 1989 and reopened in 2003 with interpretive exhibits. It was listed on the National Register of Historic Places on May 11, 2000, as one of the two oldest buildings standing in Volusia County.

== Archaeology ==
Shell middens, line the banks of the St. Johns River and the spring run. Eleven pre-contact sites have been recorded in the park. Each is listed in the Florida Master Site File, the state's inventory of historical resources, under a Smithsonian trinomial: this site's trinomial is 8VO43. At the three middens that have been surveyed in detail, deposits of the St. Johns period lie on top of Orange period deposits, which in turn overlie middle Archaic material.

=== Early excavations ===
Jeffries Wyman stayed with the Thursbys in 1873–74 and wrote letters to his son from Blue Spring. He found shell heaps on both sides of the mouth of the run. The larger, on the left bank, stretched about 500 feet (150 m) back from the river and rose to 12 to 13 feet (3.7 to 4.0 m) high. It contained human bones broken apart in what he judged a deliberate way, alongside the bones of deer, turtles and alligators, shell chisels, stone arrowpoints and plenty of pottery. Thursby told him the river had carried away more than 30 feet (9.1 m) of the mound in a few years. He also described two other large mounds nearby, the larger about 400 feet (120 m) long and 13 to 14 feet (4.0 to 4.3 m) high toward Lake Beresford. A large shell mound 0.62 miles (1 km) north of the spring, recorded as 8VO41 and named Live Oak Mound by a University of Florida team, is one that Wyman investigated.

Clarence Bloomfield Moore visited in the 1890s. According to the anthropologist John Goggin, Moore dug into the center of Starke's Grove Mound (8VO39), a sand mound in the old citrus grove on the Starke Tract. State archaeologists who revisited it in 1991 could not tell whether it was natural or man-made. (Note: The Thursby Midden (8VO35), most of which Moore's excavations of 1892–94 destroyed, is a different site. The 2005 management plan lists it among the cultural resources of neighboring Hontoon Island State Park, not Blue Spring.) A 1997 study of Moore's collections, cited in the Thursby House's NRHP nomination, traced artifacts he collected to the midden beneath the house.

=== Later surveys ===
The University of Florida's St. Johns Archaeological Field School, directed by Kenneth Sassaman, worked in the park in the summers of 2000 and 2001. Testing beneath the Thursby House before its foundation was repaired found a stratified midden about 3.9 feet (1.2 m) deep. It dated from roughly 4,300 to 3,500 radiocarbon years before present. Some of its layers lay where they had first been dropped, which Sassaman took as a sign of living areas. A ground-penetrating radar survey then traced an arc of buried features across the higher ground north and west of the house. Sassaman interpreted it as the first Orange-period village found along the middle St. Johns. About 660 feet (200 m) southwest of the house, at the site of a planned sewage plant, the team found a well-preserved shell midden more than 4,000 radiocarbon years old buried under about 3.3 feet (1 m) of river sediment. A second test unit upslope showed that this early midden runs beneath the Orange-period deposits under the house.

At Live Oak Mound the field school mapped the topography, including 135 pits left by looters in the 1970s, and tested two of them. The results suggest that the mound began as a midden about 6,300 radiocarbon years ago, in the Mount Taylor period before pottery was made in the region. Shell was then deliberately heaped on top of it in the Orange period. Wyman had reported burials from the mound's upper levels, probably from the later St. Johns II period, but the field school found no human remains. Vandalism at the site has stopped since the state acquired it.

A 2002 survey of 20 acres (8.1 ha) set aside for cabins recorded four more sites. They included two middens, a scatter of stone tools with an Archaic-period projectile point, and the bed of the 1881 railroad. A University of South Florida model completed in 2010 rated about 5.5 percent of the park as highly sensitive for archaeological remains, 26 percent as moderately sensitive and 69 percent as of low sensitivity. Blue Spring Midden B (8VO43) lies under the park's lower day-use area and carries the most foot traffic of any site, but in 2022 it was still in good condition.

== Geology and climate ==
=== Physiography ===
The park lies in the Atlantic Coastal Lowlands, a region of mostly level marine terraces, on the boarder between two smaller divisions: the Crescent City–DeLand Ridge and the St. Johns River Valley. Its northern and eastern parts reach roughly 80 feet (24 m) above sea level on the deep, well-drained sands of the DeLand Ridge, an important recharge area for the aquifer. From there the land falls gently west to the river, which is less than 5 feet (1.5 m) above sea level. The ridge was formed as a shoreline during the interglacial periods, when the sea stood far higher than today. Marine shells and old oyster beds are still exposed in the spring run. Wyman recorded marine shells in the banks of the spring and the run in the 1870s, along with bone fragments of extinct animals scattered along the run's bed. The only significant human alteration of the terrain is a pair of 1950s borrow pits, covering about 37 acres (15 ha) beside the railroad.

=== Climate ===
The park has a humid subtropical climate (Köppen Cfa). At the nearest long-term weather station, DeLand 1 SSE, about 5 miles (8.0 km) to the northeast, the average annual temperature is 70.3 °F (21.3 °C) and about 55.5 inches (1,410 mm) of rain falls a year. More than half of it falls from June through September, when each month averages about 7 inches (180 mm) or more. November is the driest month. Cold fronts can drop the river into the 40s °F (about 4–10 °C), well below the spring's temperature.

Climate data for DeLand 1 SSE, the nearest weather station (1991–2020 normals)
Month	Jan	Feb	Mar	Apr	May	Jun	Jul	Aug	Sep	Oct	Nov	Dec	Year
Mean daily maximum °F (°C)	69.1 (20.6)	72.1 (22.3)	76.4 (24.7)	81.2 (27.3)	85.9 (29.9)	89.2 (31.8)	90.9 (32.7)	90.4 (32.4)	87.7 (30.9)	82.5 (28.1)	75.8 (24.3)	71.2 (21.8)	81.0 (27.2)
Daily mean °F (°C)	56.9 (13.8)	59.7 (15.4)	63.6 (17.6)	69.1 (20.6)	74.7 (23.7)	79.8 (26.6)	81.6 (27.6)	81.5 (27.5)	79.3 (26.3)	73.0 (22.8)	65.0 (18.3)	59.8 (15.4)	70.3 (21.3)
Mean daily minimum °F (°C)	44.6 (7.0)	47.4 (8.6)	50.7 (10.4)	57.1 (13.9)	63.6 (17.6)	70.5 (21.4)	72.2 (22.3)	72.7 (22.6)	70.8 (21.6)	63.5 (17.5)	54.2 (12.3)	48.4 (9.1)	59.6 (15.3)
Average precipitation inches (mm)	3.07 (78)	2.44 (62)	3.54 (90)	2.47 (63)	4.16 (106)	8.20 (208)	8.70 (221)	7.05 (179)	6.91 (176)	3.98 (101)	2.32 (59)	2.65 (67)	55.49 (1,409)
Source: NOAA

== Ecology ==
=== Flora ===
Floodplain swamp lines the St. Johns along the park's western edge. Although it was logged decades ago, many bald cypress trees remain. The park's management plan describes the community as cypress-dominated, with tupelo, water hickory, sweetgum, cabbage palm and red maple. Inland, hydric hammock of laurel oak, cabbage palm, live oak, sweetbay and swamp tupelo gives way to upland hardwood forest on the slopes of the Starke Tract. The shell middens form their own small community of about 3.6 acres (1.5 ha). These well-drained, slightly alkaline mounds typically carry live oak, cabbage palm, red cedar and red mulberry.

The scrub on the eastern ridge, maintained by fire and cutting, is managed toward a mix of sand live oak, myrtle oak, Chapman's oak, saw palmetto and rusty staggerbush. It is broken by open patches of bare sand where lichens and small herbs grow. Several imperiled plants grow in the scrub, among them Curtiss's milkweed, Garberia and shell-mound pricklypear. The Okeechobee gourd grows at several places along the river shore, and the giant airplant Tillandsia utriculata grows in oaks overhanging the spring run. In 2022 the invasive Mexican bromeliad weevil was a new threat to these airplants. The spring run itself has little rooted vegetation, partly because wintering manatees eat what grows there.

Coral ardisia is the park's most pervasive invasive plant species. Its extent in the wet hammocks was not known until surveys began in 2009, and treatment has since cleared areas that were close to a solid stand. Along the river, wild taro, paragrass and torpedograss are treated by park staff and state contractors. Altogether, 416 acres (168 ha) were treated between July 2005 and 2022.

=== Fauna ===
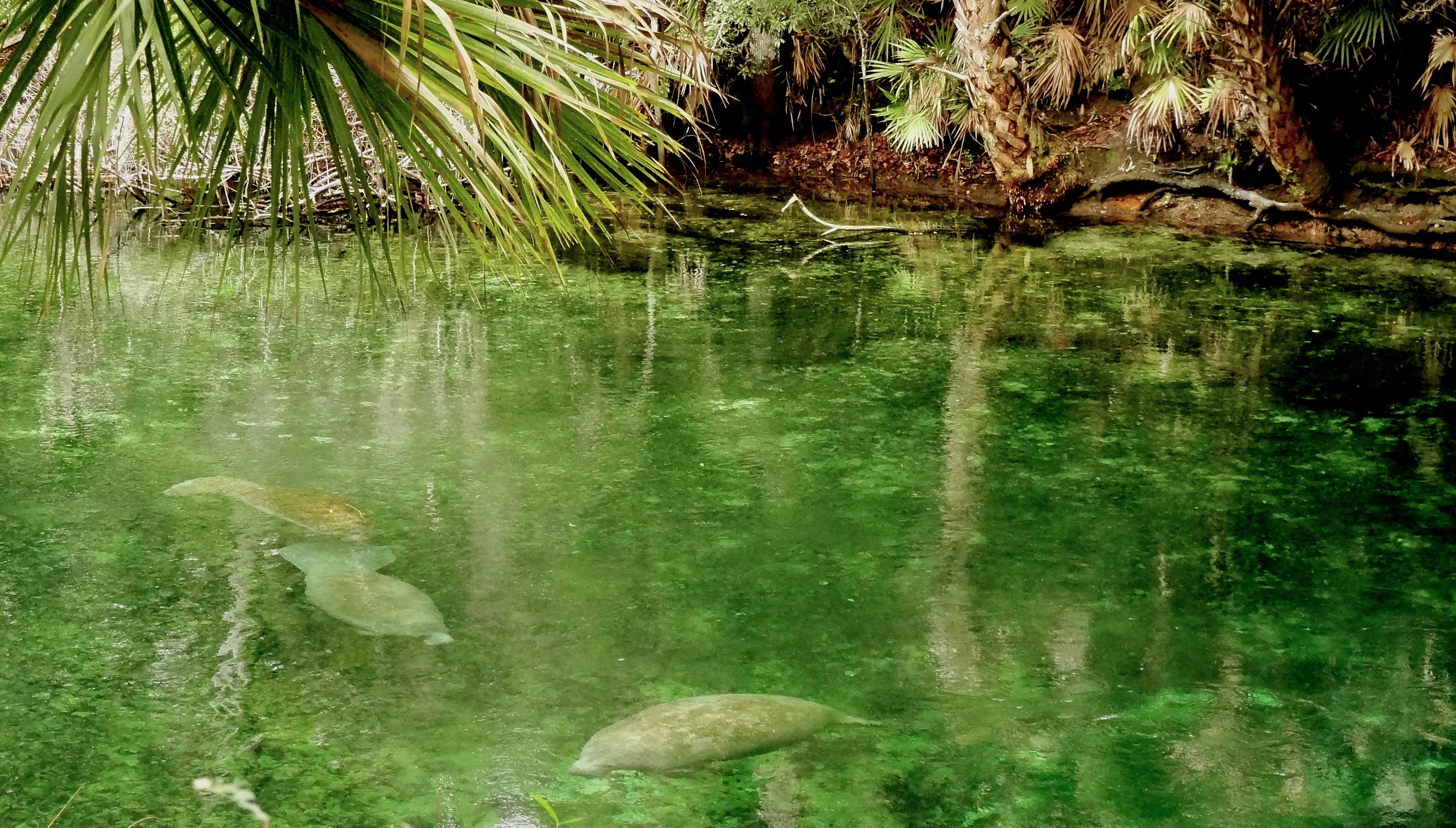
Manatees in the spring run

==== Manatee research ====
Researchers have recorded the life history of individual manatees at Blue Spring since 1978, including births, deaths, and relationships. Manatees migrate to warmer spring water during the colder weather in Florida, and often return to the same spring every year. Manatees are identified by their scar patterns, which they acquire mainly from boat strikes, but also from fishing-line entanglements, cold lesions, and fungal infections. The research data collected, both in person and through live video streaming, comprises one of the world's longest-running and comprehensive manatee databases in existence. Several government agencies partner to maintain a Manatee Individual Photo-Identification System for the Florida manatee. Identifications by state park rangers and Save the Manatee Club researchers at Blue Spring have contributed a large number of sightings to this database. During manatee season (November–March), the live video streaming of the spring is made public.

==== Other animals ====
The scrub supports a stable population of the federally threatened Florida scrub-jay, estimated in 2022 at 8 to 10 family groups and 28 to 47 birds. The state-threatened gopher tortoise digs burrows in the scrub and flatwoods. The burrows shelter other species, including the federally threatened eastern indigo snake and the state-threatened Florida pine snake. Florida black bears use the park and raise cubs there. It lies on a wildlife corridor running from the Ocala National Forest to the Wekiva basin.

== Environmental concerns ==
The increasing number of human visitors and also manatees has increased the environmental load on the spring's ecosystem. Both humans and manatees are creating water pollution, and as a result, more filamentous algae grow in the spring area.

Another environmental problem is the decrease in the natural water supply to the spring due to the groundwater pumping in the nearby cities. As a result, the output of Volusia Blue Spring has fallen over the last decades.

== Recreation ==
Blue Spring State Park has 51 campsites and six cabins that can be rented. The camping area is pet friendly.

The spring runs a few miles long and features a boardwalk that stretches 1/3 of a mile from the St. Johns River to the headspring. All water-related activities are prohibited during manatee season (mid November–March). Qualified scuba divers can descend into the spring cave in season. Picnicking is a popular pastime, with multiple pavilions available for groups and scattered picnic tables around the entire park. The park also features volleyball courts and a playground, as well as canoeing, kayaking, and fishing. The old Thursby plantation house is being maintained and has historical displays that visitors can explore. Various wildlife besides manatees can be seen also, including alligators, bears, raccoons, and various species of birds. Hontoon Island State Park is a short paddle down the St. Johns River. Foodservice, stores, and a water-activity rental station are available for supplies.
