= Southeastern conifer forests =

Temperate coniferous forests ecoregion of the United States

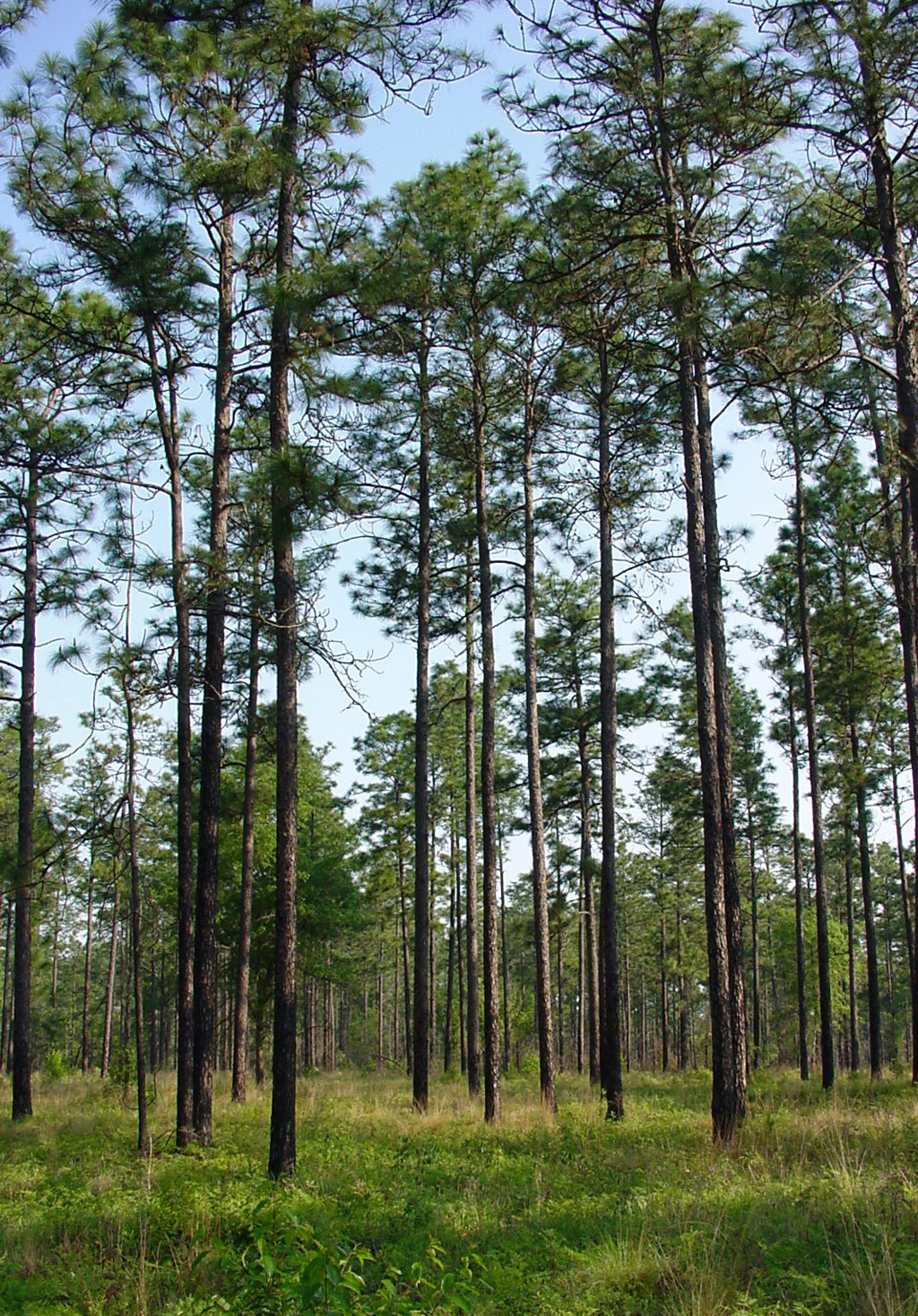
- Longleaf pine savanna

Ecology
- Realm: Nearctic
- Biome: Temperate coniferous forests Tropical and subtropical coniferous forests
- Borders: List: Middle Atlantic coastal forests; Southeastern mixed forests; Mississippi lowland forests; Western Gulf coastal grasslands; Florida sand pine scrub; Everglades
- Bird species: 236
- Mammal species: 54

Geography
- Area: 236,725 km^{2} (91,400 mi^{2})
- Country: United States
- States: Louisiana; Mississippi; Alabama; Georgia; South Carolina; Florida
- Climate type: Humid subtropical (Cfa)

Conservation
- Global 200: Yes
- Habitat loss: 30.291%
- Protected: 13.47%

The Southeastern conifer forests are a temperate coniferous forest (with some prominent subtropical areas) ecoregion of the southeastern United States. It is the largest conifer forest ecoregion east of the Mississippi River. It is also the southernmost instance of temperate coniferous forest within the Nearctic realm.

== Climate ==
This ecoregion has a humid subtropical climate with precipitation highest in the warmest months.

== Plant communities ==
Historic vegetation was dominated by open woodlands of longleaf pine (Pinus palustris) with an understory of wiregrass (Aristida stricta). Other natural communities include to pine savannas, flatwoods (pine forests with woody understories), and xeric hardwood forests.

=== Upland longleaf pine woodland ===
These are woodlands dominated by longleaf pine (Pinus palustris) and subject to frequent fires. The Atlantic coastal plain upland longleaf pine woodlands occur on uplands and on the higher parts of upland-wetland mosaics, while the east Gulf coastal plain interior upland longleaf pine woodlands occur on rolling dissected uplands, inland of the coastal flatlands. Soils are well- to excessively drained. Scrub oaks such as turkey oak (Quercus laevis) and bluejack oak (Quercus incana) are often in the understory. The herbaceous layer is dominated by grasses, particularly wiregrass: (Aristida stricta) in the north and (Aristida beyrichiana) in the south.

=== Longleaf pine sandhill ===
Florida longleaf pine sandhills consist of stands of longleaf pine (Pinus palustris) on very well-drained, sandy hills of the coastal plains of Florida. These stands are maintained by frequent fires. Turkey oak (Quercus laevis) is common in the understory. Wiregrass (Aristida beyrichiana) makes up the ground layer.

=== Near-coast pine flatwood ===
East Gulf coastal plain near-coast pine flatwoods are forests and woodlands on broad, sandy flatlands along the northern Gulf of Mexico. Trees are typically longleaf pine (Pinus palustris) or slash pine (Pinus elliottii). Fires are naturally frequent, occurring every one to four years. Understory vegetation ranges from open and grassy to dense and shrubby, depending on fire history. Shrubs include swamp titi (Cyrilla racemiflora), gallberry (Ilex coriacea), Appalachia tea (Ilex glabra), fetterbush lyonia (Lyonia lucida), and saw palmetto (Serenoa repens).

=== Nonriverine cypress dome ===
Southern coastal plain nonriverine cypress domes are small forested wetlands characterized by their dome-shaped appearance, with taller trees in the center and shorter trees around the perimeter. These wetlands occur on poorly drained depressions surrounded by pine flatwoods. Pond cypress (Taxodium ascendens) dominates the canopy, which it shares with swamp tupelo (Nyssa biflora) and sweetgum (Liquidambar styraciflua).

=== Oak dome and hammock ===
The southern coastal plain oak dome and hammock occurs as thick stands of evergreen oaks in small patches on shallow depressions or slight hills. These forests are distinct from their surrounding habitats, which are often longleaf pine-dominated. On mesic sites, common species are southern live oak (Quercus virginiana), sand laurel oak (Quercus hemisphaerica), and American persimmon (Diospyros virginiana). The understory is sparse, with trumpet creeper (Campsis radicans) and greenbrier (Smilax spp). On xeric sites, common species are sand live oak (Quercus geminata), longleaf pine (Pinus palustris), southern live oak (Quercus virginiana), wiregrass (Aristida stricta), and southern dawnflower (Stylisma humistrata).

=== Hydric hammock ===
Southern coastal plain hydric hammocks are found on the flat lowlands of the southern and outermost parts of the coastal plain, usually over limestone substrates. These forests of evergreen and deciduous hardwood trees occur near the floodplains of spring-fed rivers with relatively constant flows. They can be large areas of broad, shallow wetlands. Common trees include Atlantic white cedar (Chamaecyparis thyoides), elm (Ulmus americana), red maple (Acer rubrum), swamp laurel oak (Quercus laurifolia), southern live oak (Quercus virginiana), American sweetgum (Liquidambar styraciflua), sugarberry (Celtis laevigata), and cabbage palm (Sabal palmetto). Dahoon holly (Ilex cassine) is a typical shrub.

=== Maritime forest ===
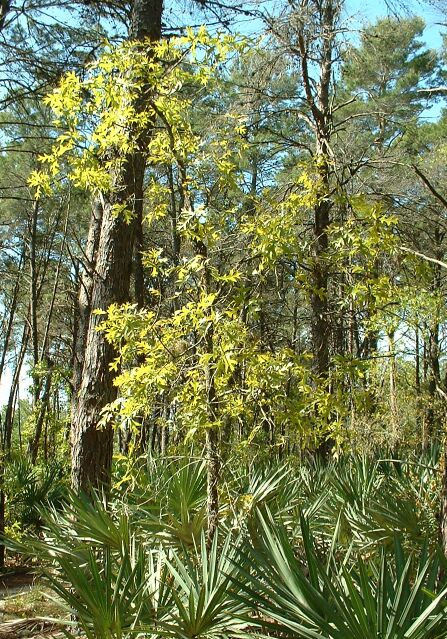
Turkey oak near Palm Bay, Florida.

On the Gulf coastal plain, maritime forest consists of a mosaic of forests and shrublands on barrier islands and strands. It occurs in sheltered areas behind coastal dunes and grasslands. Forests are dominated by a mixture of needle-leaved and broad-leaved evergreen trees, including sand pine (Pinus clausa), slash pine (Pinus elliottii), longleaf pine (Pinus palustris), southern live oak (Quercus virginiana), cabbage palm (Sabal palmetto), pignut hickory (Carya glabra), and sand hickory (Carya pallida). Wetland areas are dominated by pond cypress (Taxodium ascendens) and sweetbay magnolia (Magnolia virginiana). Wind and salt spray from the ocean can make these forests appear pruned and sculpted.

On the Atlantic coastal plain, maritime forest consists of forests and shrublands on stabilized upland dunes of barrier islands and strands. Oaks tend to dominate the overstory, often southern live oak (Quercus virginiana) and sand live oak (Quercus geminata). Woodlands dominated by pine species include southern species such as longleaf pine (Pinus palustris), pond pine (Pinus serotina), and slash pine (Pinus elliottii). The understory is dense and shrubby, including southern live oak (Quercus virginiana), sand live oak (Quercus geminata), laurel oak (Quercus hemisphaerica), Chapman oak (Quercus chapmanii), myrtle oak (Quercus myrtifolia), and southern magnolia (Magnolia grandiflora).

=== Dry upland hardwood forest ===
This includes a variety of deciduous oak forests and mixed evergreen forests dominated by oak. Pines are often present as well. This forest is found in fire-sheltered locations surrounded by pine-dominated uplands, including slopes near rivers and sinkholes. Sand laurel oak (Quercus hemisphaerica) is the typical oak species; post oak (Quercus stellata), southern red oak (Quercus falcata), and white oak (Quercus alba) are associates. The forest canopy can be diverse, including hickories and other hardwood species. Common pines include loblolly pine (Pinus taeda), spruce pine (Pinus glabra), or shortleaf pine (Pinus echinata). To the south, this becomes the southern coastal plain oak dome and hammock.

=== Mesic slope forest ===
On the southern Atlantic coastal plain, mesic slope forest is found on steep slopes, bluffs, and sheltered ravines. Fire is rare. They occur on mesic soils, and contain species not found in other forest systems in the area. These include American beech (Fagus grandifolia), southern magnolia (Magnolia grandiflora), and purple anise (Illicium floridanum). The related east Gulf coastal plain northern mesic hardwood slope forest occurs to the north and has more deciduous trees.

On the inland east Gulf coastal plain, mesic slope forest consists of deciduous hardwood forests found in slopes and ravines. They inhabit mesic sites between drier uplands and moister streams. American beech (Fagus grandifolia), white oak (Quercus alba), and cherrybark oak (Quercus pagoda) are the distinguishing tree species. Loblolly pine (Pinus taeda) is common in the southern part of the range. The related southern coastal plain mesic slope forest is found to the south.

=== Dry and dry-mesic oak forest ===
These forests occur on dry and dry-mesic sites and are dominated by oaks and hickories. These habitats are protected from fires by either steep topography, isolation, or limited flammability of the vegetation. Typical canopy species include white oak (Quercus alba), sand laurel oak (Quercus hemisphaerica), mockernut hickory (Carya tomentosa), and pignut hickory (Carya glabra).

=== Highlands freshwater marsh ===
Floridian highlands freshwater marshes are highland marshes found in shallow peat-filled valleys, the basins of dried lakes, and the borders of existing lakes. The vegetation mosaic includes a range of mostly herbaceous plant communities, varying based on water depth. Deep water supports various submerged and floating plants. Meter-deep water supports emergent herbaceous perennials, typically in dense, monospecific stands; species include bulrush (Typha latifolia), pickerelweed (Pontederia cordata), and American lotus (Nelumbo lutea). Shallow areas only submerged during wet season support more graminoid vegetation, including maidencane (Panicum hemitomon) and southern cutgrass (Leersia hexandra). Subsidence and drainage pattern changes make these habitats shift and change over time. Soils can be mucky, loamy, or sandy, but they are generally above permeable subsoils that create standing water much of the year. These marshes may also be called meadows or prairies.

=== Nonriverine basin swamp ===
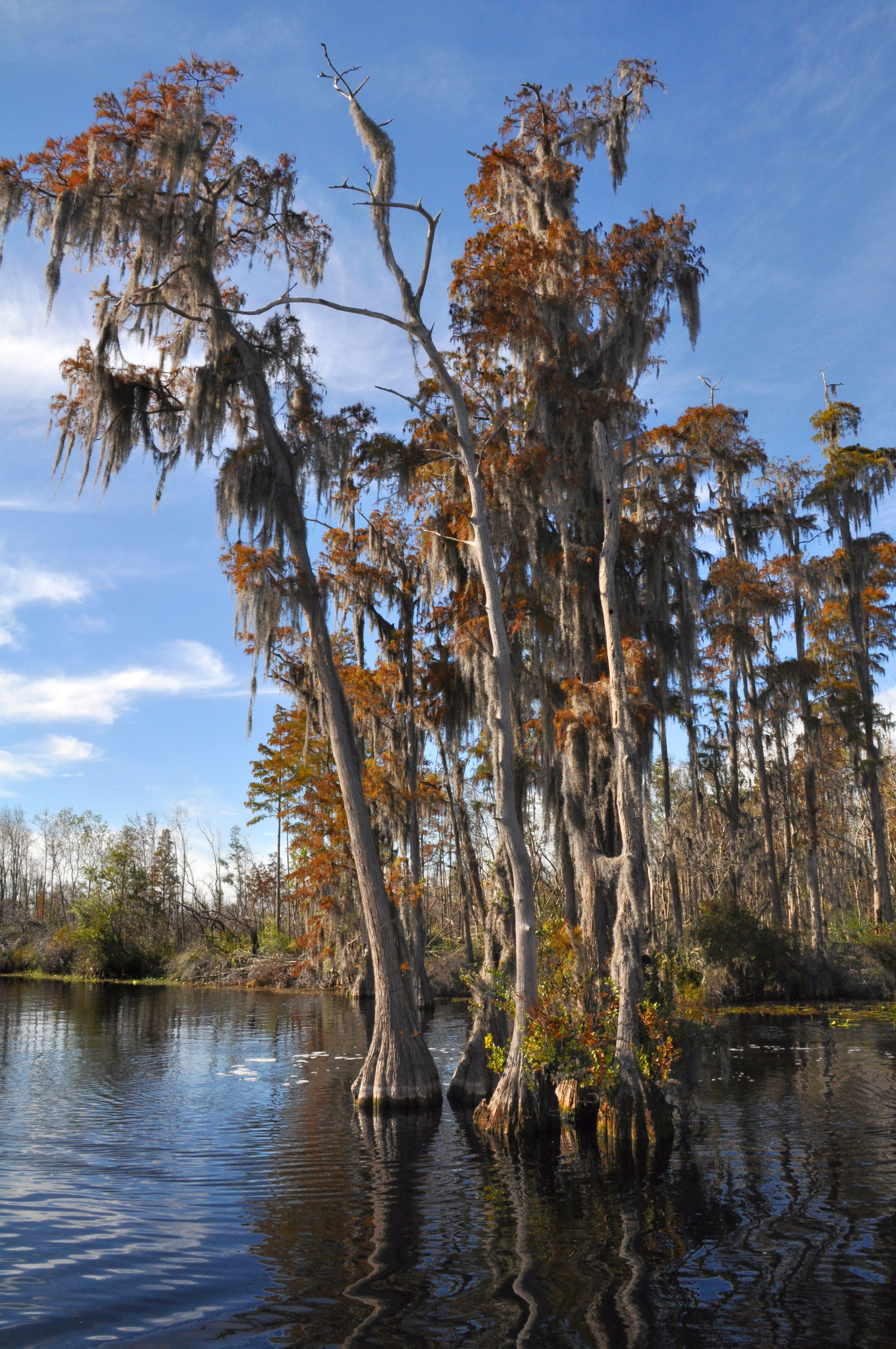
Bald cypress basin swamp in Okefenokee Swamp.

Southern coastal plain nonriverine basin swamps occur in large, seasonally-flooded depressions away from rivers. Sites are often forested by trees including bald cypress (Taxodium distichum), swamp tupelo (Nyssa biflora), evergreen shrubs, and hardwoods. Slash pine (Pinus elliottii) is sometimes found. Characteristic shrubs include buckwheat tree (Cliftonia monophylla), swamp cyrilla (Cyrilla racemiflora), fetterbush lyonia (Lyonia lucida), and laurelleaf greenbrier (Smilax laurifolia).

=== Blackwater river floodplain forest ===
Southern coastal plain blackwater river floodplain forests occur in the drainages of blackwater rivers and streams. Typical trees include bald cypress (Taxodium distichum), water tupelo (Nyssa aquatica), and Atlantic white cedar (Chamaecyparis thyoides).

== Fauna ==
Mature longleaf pine forests are important habitat for the vulnerable red-cockaded woodpecker (Picoides borealis) and gopher tortoise (Gopherus polyphemus).

== Areas of natural habitat ==
Today, nearly all mature stands of longleaf pine are gone, and only a few isolated sites still contain substantial natural habitat. In many areas, longleaf pine forests have been replaced with plantations of slash pine (Pinus elliottii), which are less biologically diverse than native habitat.

- Bogue Chitto National Wildlife Refuge
- De Soto National Forest
  - Black Creek Wilderness
  - Leaf Wilderness
- Conecuh National Forest
- Blackwater River State Forest
- Point Washington State Forest
- Deer Lake State Park
- Torreya State Park
- St. Joseph Peninsula State Park
- St. Vincent National Wildlife Refuge
- St. George Island State Park
- St. Andrews State Park
- Bald Point State Park
- Tate's Hell State Forest
- Apalachicola National Forest
  - Mud Swamp/New River Wilderness
  - Bradwell Bay Wilderness
- Gulf Islands National Seashore
- Mississippi Sandhill Crane National Wildlife Refuge
- Grand Bay National Wildlife Refuge
- Edward Ball Wakulla Springs State Park
- Wakulla State Forest
- St. Marks National Wildlife Refuge
  - St. Marks Wilderness
- Okefenokee Swamp
  - Okefenokee Wilderness
- Suwannee River State Park
- Osceola National Forest
  - Big Gum Swamp Wilderness
- Cumberland Island National Seashore
  - Cumberland Island Wilderness
- Jennings State Forest
- Paynes Prairie
- Ocala National Forest
  - Little Lake George Wilderness
  - Alexander Springs Wilderness
- Lake Woodruff National Wildlife Refuge
  - Lake Woodruff Wilderness
- Tiger Bay State Forest
- St. Johns National Wildlife Refuge
- Cedar Keys National Wildlife Refuge
  - Cedar Keys Wilderness
- Myakka River State Park
- Kissimmee Prairie Preserve State Park
- Withlacoochee State Forest
- Chassahowitzka National Wildlife Refuge
  - Chassahowitzka Wilderness
- Goethe State Forest
- Waccasassa Bay Preserve State Park
- San Felasco Hammock Preserve State Park
- Lake Talquin State Forest
- Three Rivers State Park
- Mike Roess Gold Head Branch State Park
- Florida Caverns State Park

== See also ==
- List of ecoregions in the United States (WWF)
