= Apalachicola National Forest =

American national forest in Florida

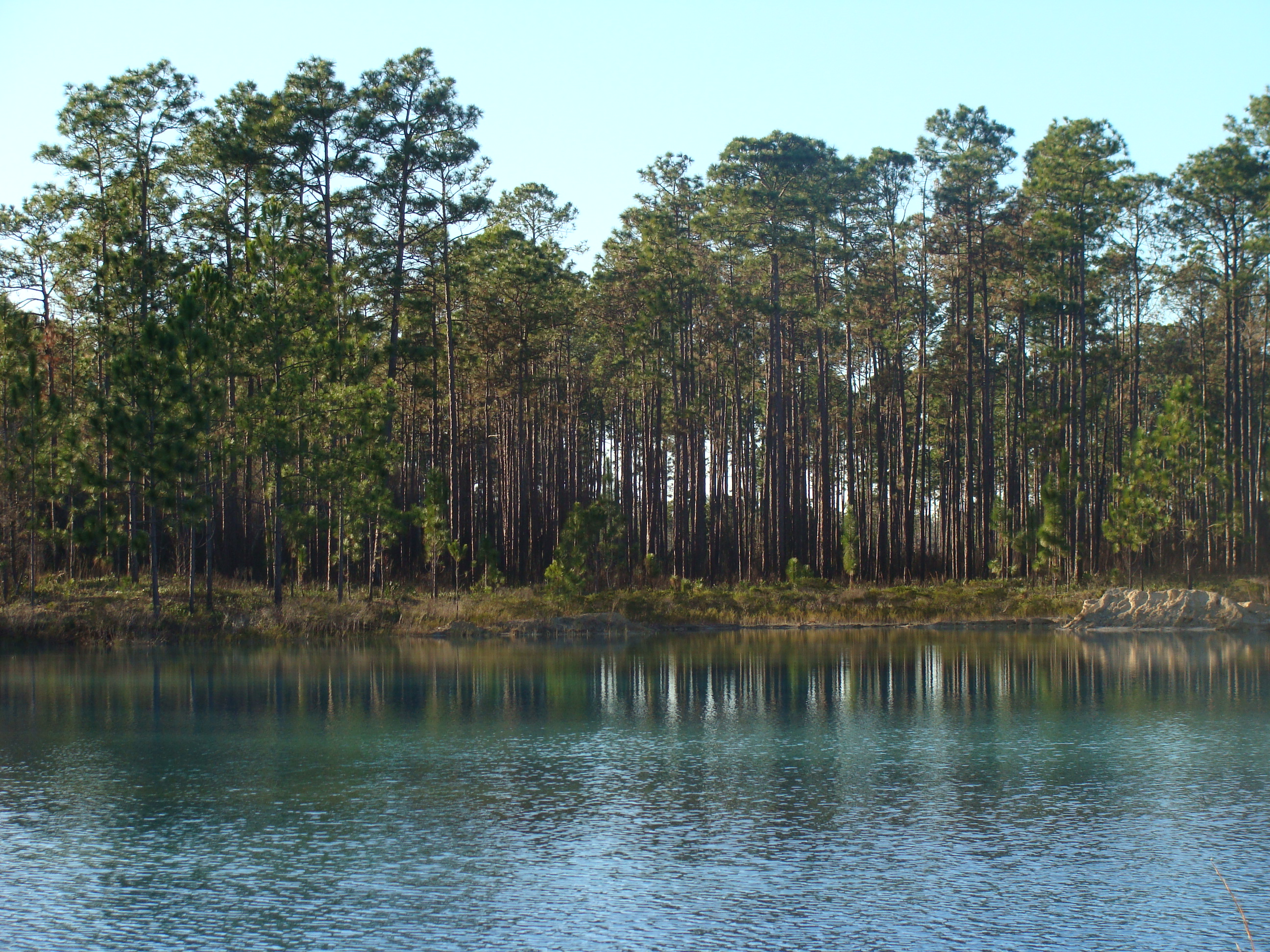

- Location within the United States
- Location: Florida, U.S.
- Nearest city: Tallahassee, FL
- Coordinates: 30°14′10″N 84°39′56″W
- Area: 632,890 acres (2,561.2 km^{2})
- Max. elevation: 184 ft. (56 m): 30.4326, -84.3855
- Created: May 13, 1936
- Governing body: U.S. Forest Service
- Website: Apalachicola National Forest

The Apalachicola National Forest is the largest U.S. National Forest in the state of Florida. It encompasses 635,019 acres (992.217 sq mi; 2,569.83 km^{2}) of which 576,374 acres are under National Forest System management. It is the only national forest located in the Florida Panhandle. The National Forest provides water and land-based outdoors activities such as off-road biking, hiking, swimming, boating, hunting, fishing, horse-back riding, and off-road ATV usage.

Apalachicola National Forest contains two Wilderness Areas: Bradwell Bay Wilderness and Mud Swamp/New River Wilderness. There are also several special purpose areas: Camel Lake Recreation Area, Fort Gadsden Historical Site, Leon Sinks Geological Area, Silver Lake Recreation Area, Trout Pond Recreation Area, and Wright Lake Recreation Area. In descending order of forest land area it is located in parts of Liberty, Wakulla, Leon, and Franklin counties. The forest is headquartered in Tallahassee, as are all three National Forests in Florida, but there are local forest ranger district offices located in Bristol and Crawfordville.

== History and culture ==
The forest was created by Presidential Proclamation 2169 dated May 13, 1936 signed by President Franklin D. Roosevelt.

Archaeological excavations indicate that Middle Woodland mound-building cultures (approximately 100 BCE–500 CE) occupied the Apalachicola basin, including Bristol Mound and Pierce Mound, that are associated with the Weeden Island cultural tradition.

== Hunting and fishing ==
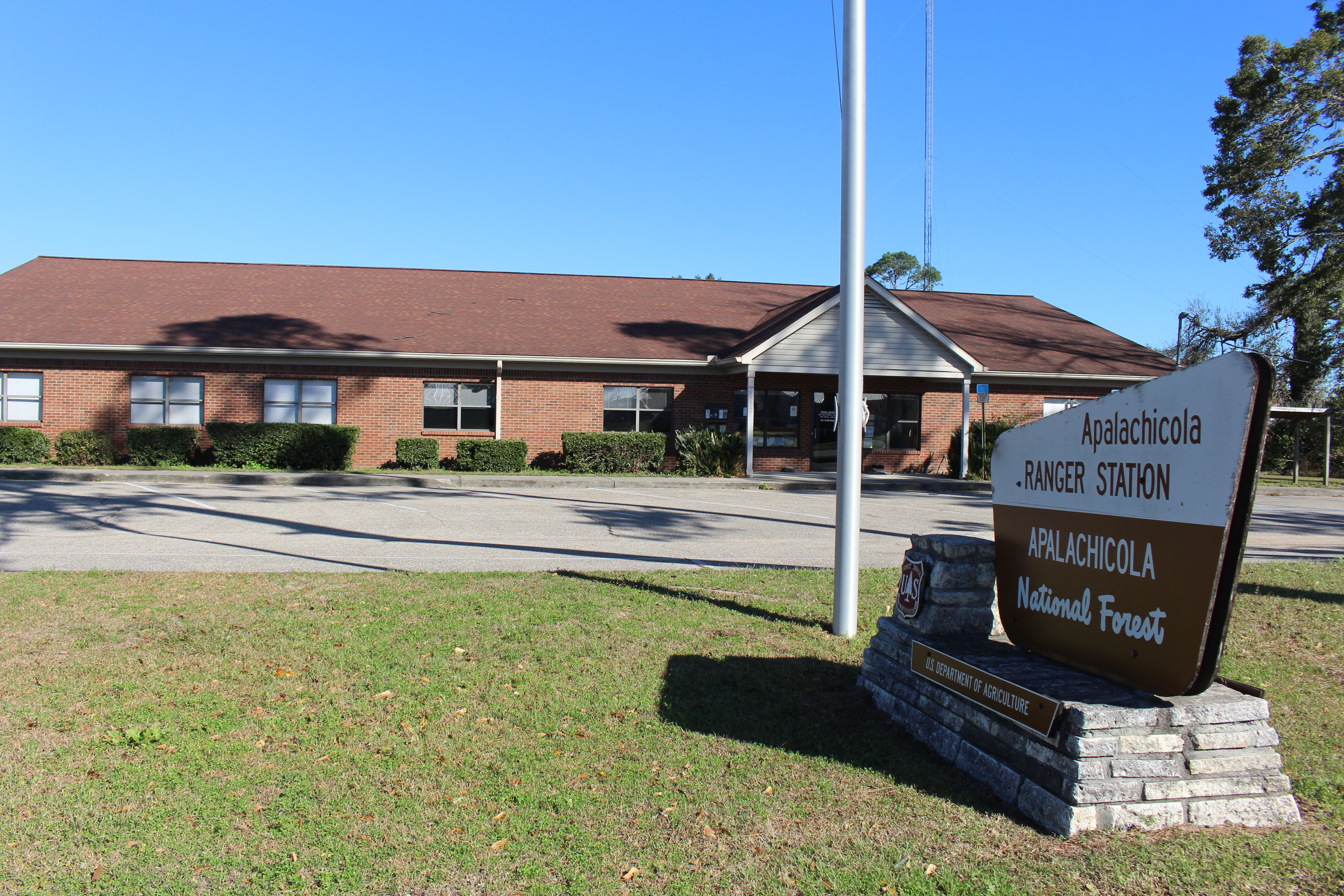
Apalachicola Ranger Station in Bristol

Hunting and fishing are monitored and governed by the Florida Fish and Wildlife Conservation Commission (FWC). The national forest itself is a wildlife management area. The FWC divides the management area into sections that allow dog hunting, still hunting, and private property. Modern gun season for large game starts Thanksgiving weekend and ends in January.

The Apalachicola National Forest also manages the Chipola Experimental Forest in Calhoun county in cooperation with the FWC, for youth hunting.

== Recreation and scenic byways ==
The Apalachee Savannahs Scenic Byway traverses sections of the forest, providing access to longleaf pine savannas and interpretive overlooks aimed at conservation goals.

== Environment ==
The Apalachicola National Forest is in the southeastern conifer forests ecoregion. Areas of the national forest with dry, sandy soils support Florida longleaf pine sandhills and east Gulf coastal plain near-coast pine flatwoods. Sandhills are woodlands dominated by longleaf pine (Pinus palustris). Pine flatwoods are forests and woodlands on broad, sandy flatlands. Both of these pine communities are sustained by frequent fires.

Near the floodplains of spring-fed rivers grow southern coastal plain hydric hammocks, dense forests of evergreen and deciduous hardwood trees. Blackwater rivers support southern coastal plain blackwater river floodplain forests of baldcypress (Taxodium distichum) along their banks. Major rivers support diverse east Gulf coastal plain large river floodplain forests.

Notable animals that inhabit this forest are red-cockaded woodpecker, fox squirrel, red fox, raccoon, gray fox, bobcat, coyote, black bear, wild turkey and alligator.

Frequent surface fires are necessary to maintain the open longleaf-pine grassland condition favored by the threatened red-cockaded woodpecker. Research demonstrates that stands with fire-intervals of more than 10 years have reduced cavity-tree quality and lower woodpecker densities.

Recent habitat-modelling research with GIS and vegetation-structure indicators has mapped ecological condition for longleaf pine stands in the forest and determined that structural complexity rises with biodiversity and fire-resilience.

It is also home to several wetland plant communities. Southern coastal plain nonriverine basin swamps are large, seasonally flooded depressions of baldcypress (Taxodium distichum) and swamp tupelo (Nyssa biflora). East Gulf coastal plain savannas and wet prairies are low, flat plains covered in grasses and sedges, which are seasonally flooded and maintained by frequent fires. Southern coastal plain nonriverine cypress domes are small wetlands of pond cypress (Taxodium ascendens) notable for their dome-shaped appearance.

Recent studies have documented the recovery of shrub-invaded wet prairies within the forest by combining mechanical surface-scraping with prescribed fire. Treatments significantly impact soil nutrient profiles and organic matter accumulations, hastening herbaceous plant recovery.

Within the Munson Sand Hills sub-region of the forest, several temporary rain-filled ponds shelter unique assemblages of aquatic amphibians and insects. Fluctuations of water chemistry were correlated with insect community structure by one investigation.

The Forest contains thousands of acres of old growth Pond Cypress swamps (cypress domes). In addition, Bradwell Bay Wilderness contains about 100 acres (40 ha) of old-growth slash pine - Swamp Tupelo swamps.

== Gallery ==
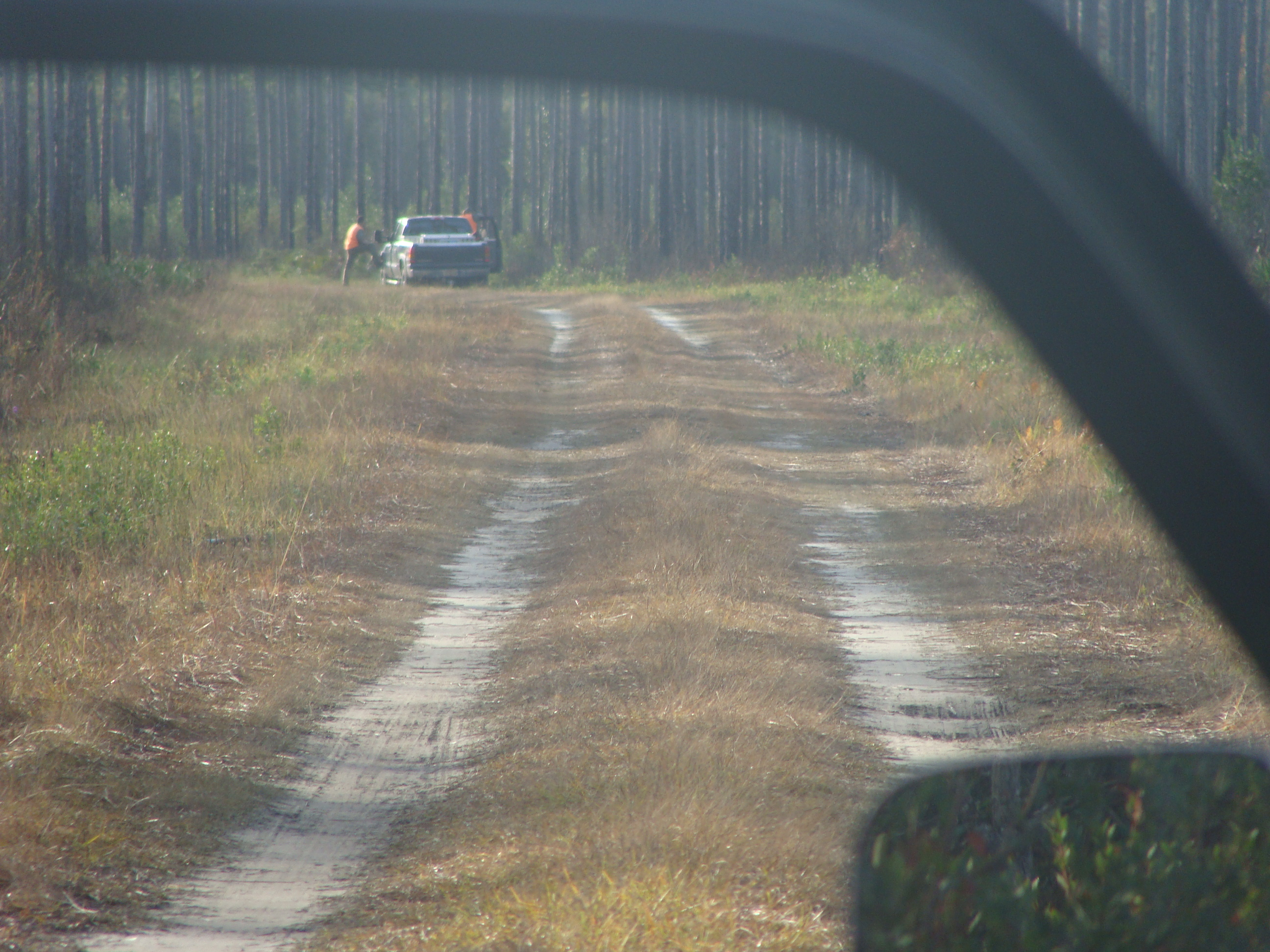
Hunters listening for the direction of dogs following the scent of a white tail deer

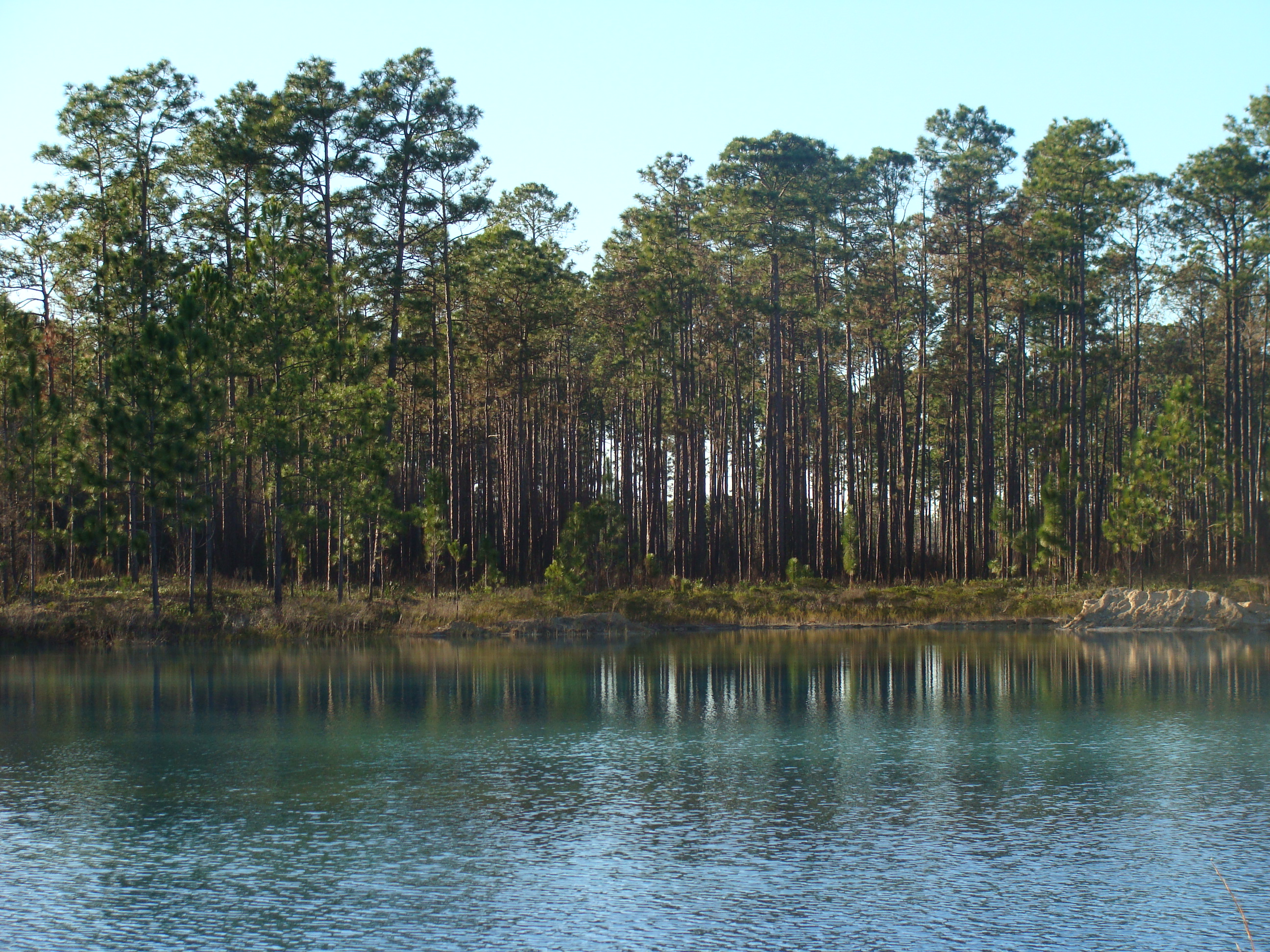
An artificial pond off of FH-111

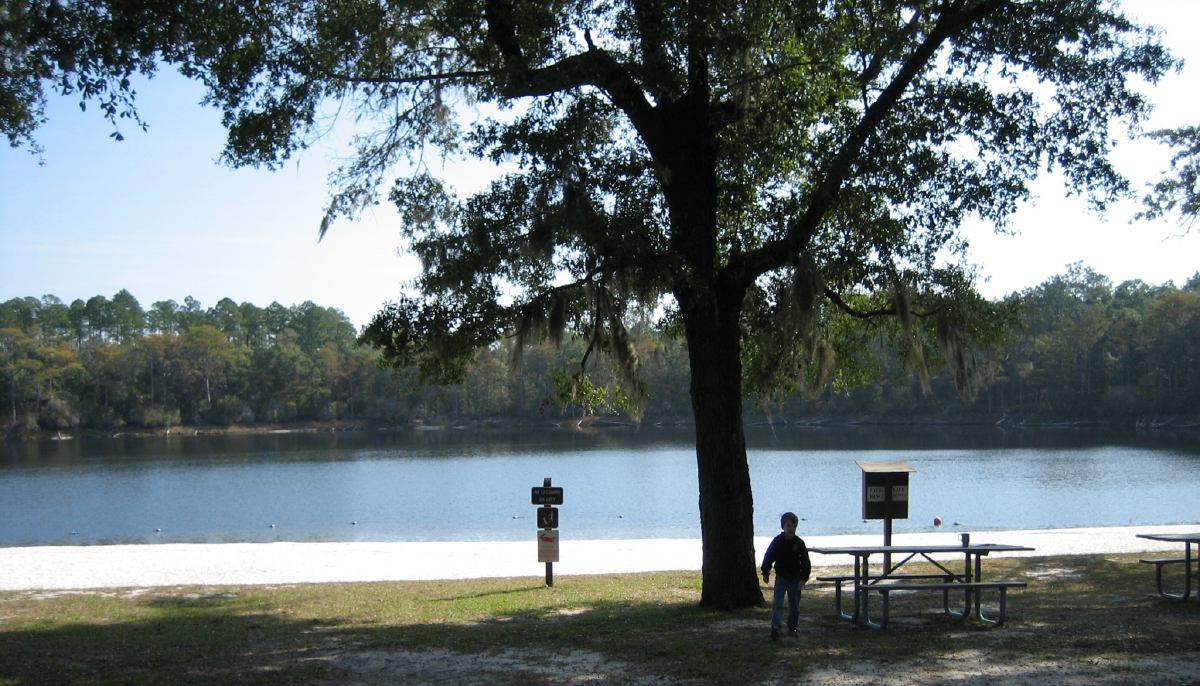
Silver Lake Recreation Area, a part of the Apalachicola National Forest, about 8 miles (13 km) from Tallahassee, Florida, in 2007

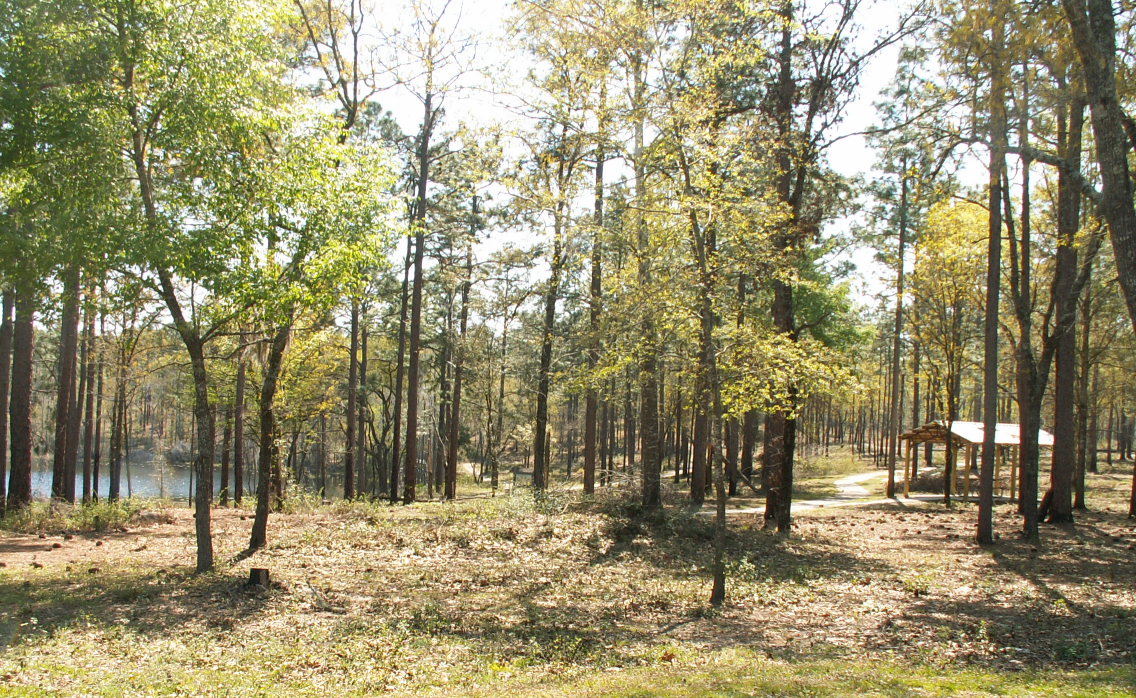
Trout Pond Recreation Area, a part of the Apalachicola National Forest, about 6 miles (9.7 km) south of Tallahassee

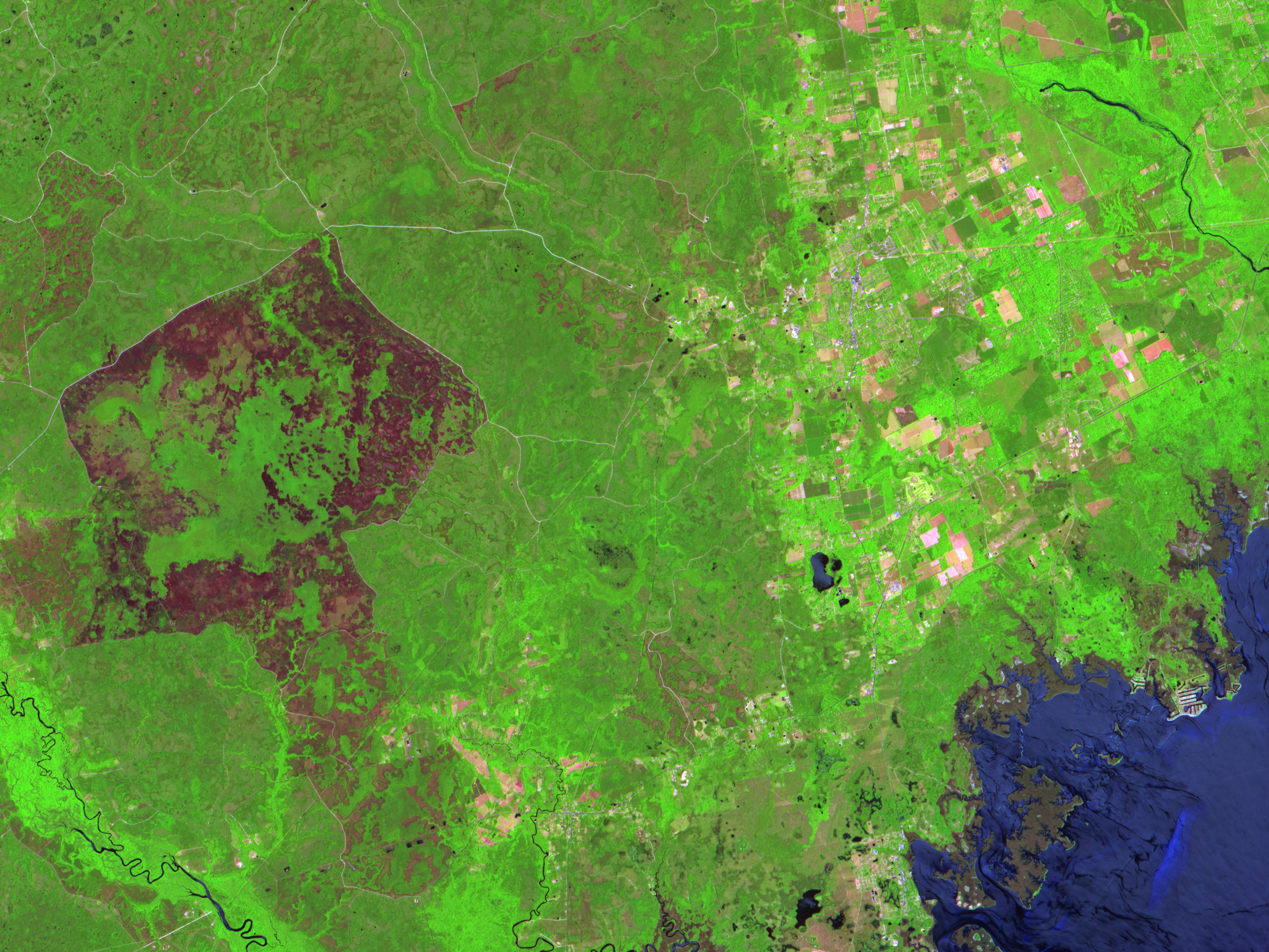
This image shows a large area burned by a forest fire, which appears as dark pink ring-shaped patch at the left side of the image

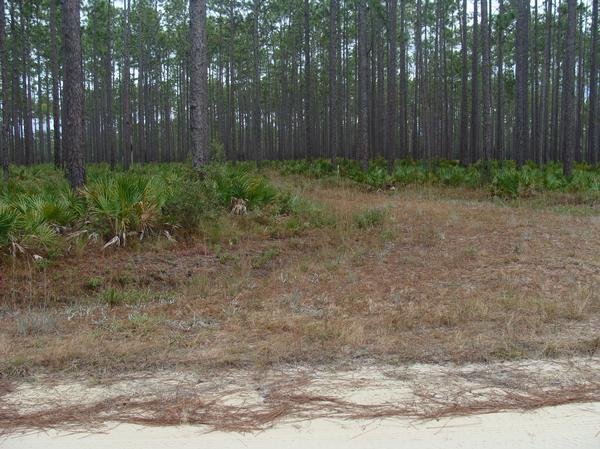
An unimproved road in the Wildlife Management Area off of Hwy. 67

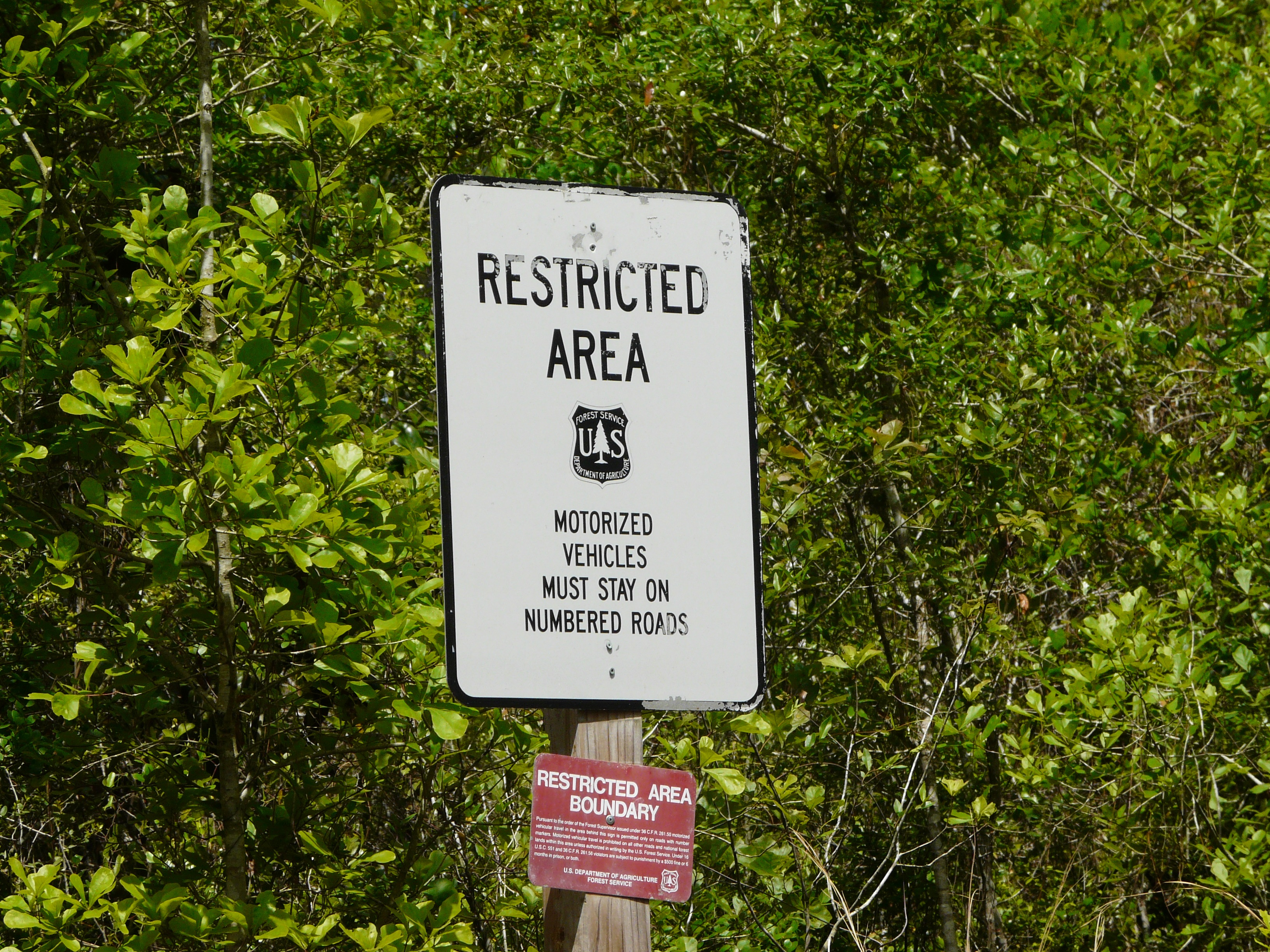
Sign warning vehicles to remain on numbered forest roads

== See also ==
- List of national forests of the United States
- Allen Nease
- Ocala National Forest
- Osceola National Forest
