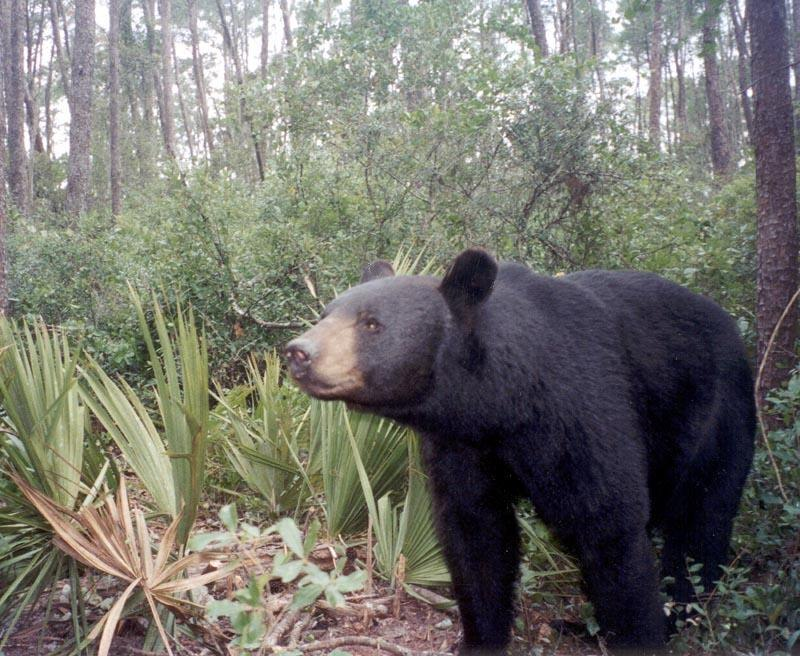
- A Florida black bear in the Ocala National Forest

Conservation status
- Apparently Secure (NatureServe)

Scientific classification
- Kingdom: Animalia
- Phylum: Chordata
- Class: Mammalia
- Order: Carnivora
- Family: Ursidae
- Genus: Ursus
- Species: U. americanus
- Subspecies: U. a. floridanus

Trinomial name
- Ursus americanus floridanus Merriam, 1896
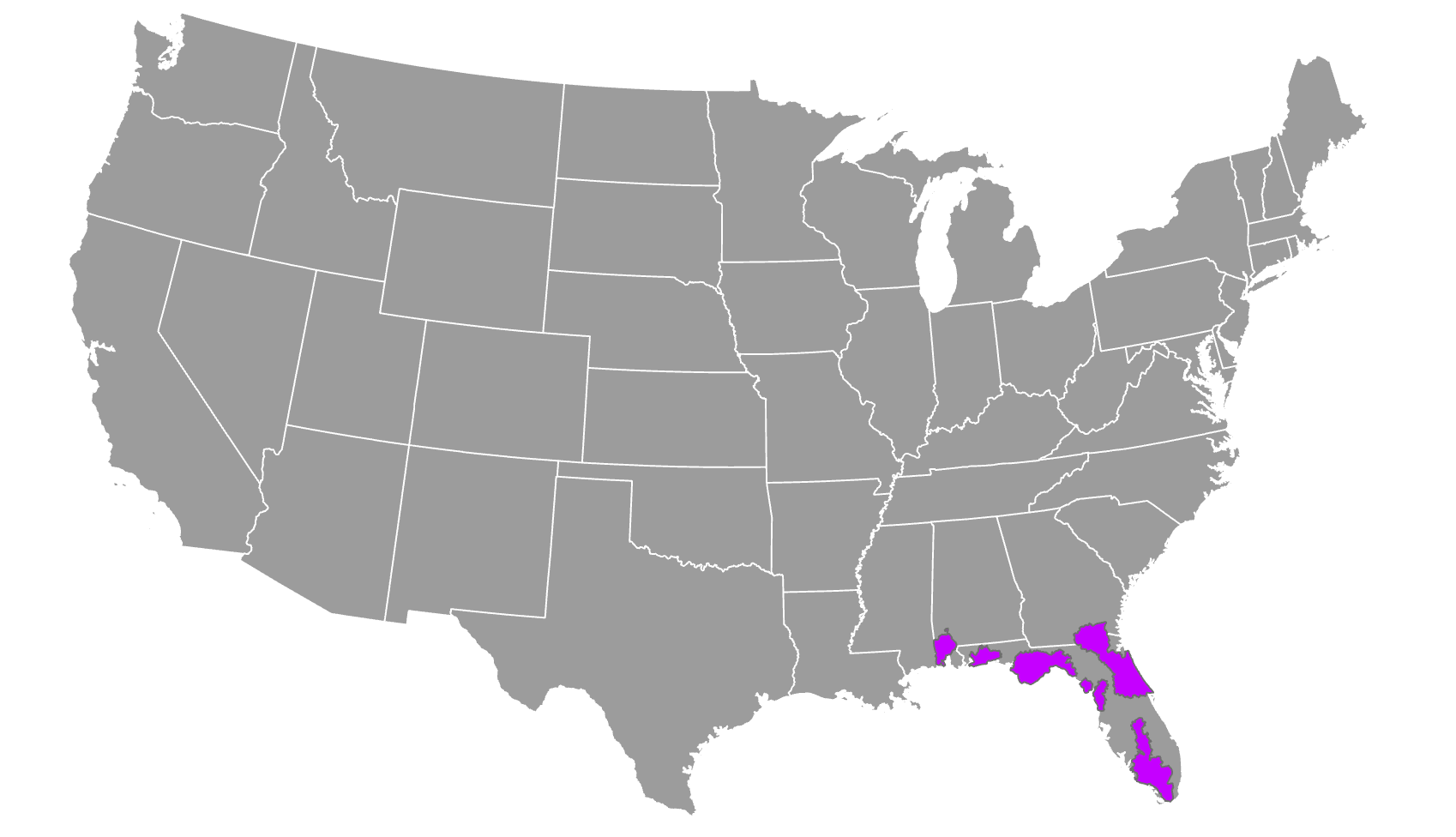
- Florida black bear range

= Florida black bear =

Subspecies of carnivore

The Florida black bear (Ursus americanus floridanus) is a subspecies of the American black bear that has historically ranged throughout most of Florida and the southern portions of Georgia, Alabama, and Mississippi. The large black-furred bears live mainly in forested areas and have seen recent habitat reduction throughout the state with increased human development as well as habitat modifications within bear habitat.

== Description ==
=== Physical ===
Florida black bears are typically large-bodied with shiny black fur, a short tail, and many have brown fur on their muzzles. Pelage color is consistently black in Florida, but summer molting of the guard hairs may cause them to look brown. A white chest patch, called a blaze, is found in about 30% of the population. It is Florida's second largest terrestrial mammal (behind the American bison that are still found in Paynes Prairie Preserve State Park), with an average male weight of 300 pounds (140 kg); the largest known male weighed 760 pounds (340 kg) found in Seminole County, and the largest known female was 400 pounds (180 kg) and found in Liberty County. Females generally weigh about half as much as males. Average adults have a length of between 4 feet (120 cm) and 6 feet (180 cm), standing between 2.5 feet (76 cm) and 3.5 feet (110 cm) high at the shoulder. Their feet have short, curved, non-retractable claws on each of the five digits. Black bears walk with the entire sole of their feet touching the ground. Bears use a pacing stride, where both legs on the same side move together so that the hind foot is placed in or slightly in front of the track of the forefoot; the smaller (inner) toe occasionally does not register in the track. The eyes are small, and the ears are round and erect.

=== Behavior ===
Black bears are shy and reclusive. They use various means to express their emotions including vocalizations, body language, and scent marking. They are mainly solitary, except when females have dependent cubs or during mating season. Although they are solitary mammals, they are not territorial and typically do not defend their range from other bears, but they will defend a food source from other bears. Black bears have good eyesight (especially at close range), acute hearing and an excellent sense of smell that is believed to be the best of any land mammal.

=== Reproduction ===
Females become sexually mature at three to four years of age. Breeding occurs from mid-June to mid-August, and coital stimulation is required in order to induce ovulation. Black bears experience delayed implantation, where fertilized eggs temporarily cease development after a few divisions, float free in the uterus and do not implant until late November or December. This adaptation allows bears to synchronize reproduction with annual food cycles. Lowered nutritional levels caused by poor acorn or berry production can result in delayed first breeding, decreased litter sizes, and increased incidence of non-reproductive females. Reproductive females enter winter dens in mid- to late December and emerge in early to mid-April after a mean denning period of 100 to 113 days.

Actual gestation is 60 days, and cubs are born in late January to mid-February. Most studies in Florida have documented an average litter size of approximately two cubs, although greater productivity in Ocala National Forest in older females and females with previous litters has been noted. At birth, cubs weigh approximately 12 ounces and are partially furred but blind and toothless. Neonatal growth is rapid and cubs weigh six to eight pounds by the time they leave the den at about ten weeks of age. Cubs stay with their mother and may den with her the following year. Family dissolution usually occurs between May and July when cubs are 15 to 17 months old. Females generally form a home range overlapping their natal range, while young males disperse to new areas.

== Habitat ==
Florida black bears live mainly in forested habitats and are common in sand-pine scrub, oak scrub, upland hardwood forests and forested wetlands. They are the only subspecies to live in a tropical region, in South Florida. To a lesser extent, they also inhabit dry prairie and tropical hammock.

=== Abundance and range ===
Before Florida was settled by Europeans, black bears occupied all of the Floridan mainland and even the upper Florida Keys, with a population of around 11,000. Bear numbers declined by 97% to 300 bears by 1970. Mark-recapture studies suggested that there were approximately 4,000 bears in Florida by 2015. Between 2011 and 2020, bears were frequently sighted in 29% of Florida and ranged through approximately 51% of Florida (including cities, waterbodies, and other non-habitat contained within the occupied range outline). Compared to the previous decade (2001–2010), this estimate was a 11% increase in range.

The subspecies occurs in fragmented populations in Florida, southern Alabama, southern Georgia and southern Mississippi. Most major populations of Florida black bears live on or near public lands. These include Ocala National Forest, Big Cypress National Preserve, Apalachicola National Forest, Osceola National Forest and Okefenokee National Wildlife Refuge. In Florida, they exist within seven subpopulations which are genetically and geographically isolated.

== Diet ==
Florida black bears are omnivores. Their diet consists of 80 percent plants, 15 percent insects, and 5 percent animal matter. Usually the animal matter consists of carrion and is found by scavenging. Their diet varies greatly with the seasons, likely because many of their preferred species of flora and fauna are seasonal. In the spring, they mainly consume Sabal palmetto, Thalia geniculata, Sus scrofa, Bombus bimaculatus and Camponotus species. In the summer, they primarily eat Serenoa repens, Ilex glabra, Rubus species, Phytolacca rigida, Vaccinium species, Camponotus species, Anisomorpha buprestoides and the eggs of Alligator mississippiensis. In the fall, they eat Serenoa repens, Ilex glabra, Nyssa biflora, Vespula species, Apis mellifera, and Dasypus mexicanus.

== Status ==
In 2012 the Florida Fish and Wildlife Conservation Commission (FWC) delisted the Florida black bear, using IUCN Red List criteria to evaluate the species' risk of extinction. The 2012 Florida Black Bear Management Plan was approved and put into action to prevent the subspecies from being listed in the future. While the Florida black bear was removed from the state list of threatened species, the Bear Conservation Rule (68A-4.009) was adopted at the same time, providing continued protections to the species.

There are numerous laws protecting the Florida black bear. Some examples of state protections include: it is illegal to feed bears (F.A.C. 68A-4.001), kill bears because they are deemed a 'nuisance' (F.A.C. 68A-9.010), or sell/purchase bear parts (F.A.C. 68A-12.004 (12)). The Bear Conservation Rule prohibits a 'take' of the subspecies, unless a permit is issued by the FWC (F.A.C. 68A-4.009).

=== Mortality ===
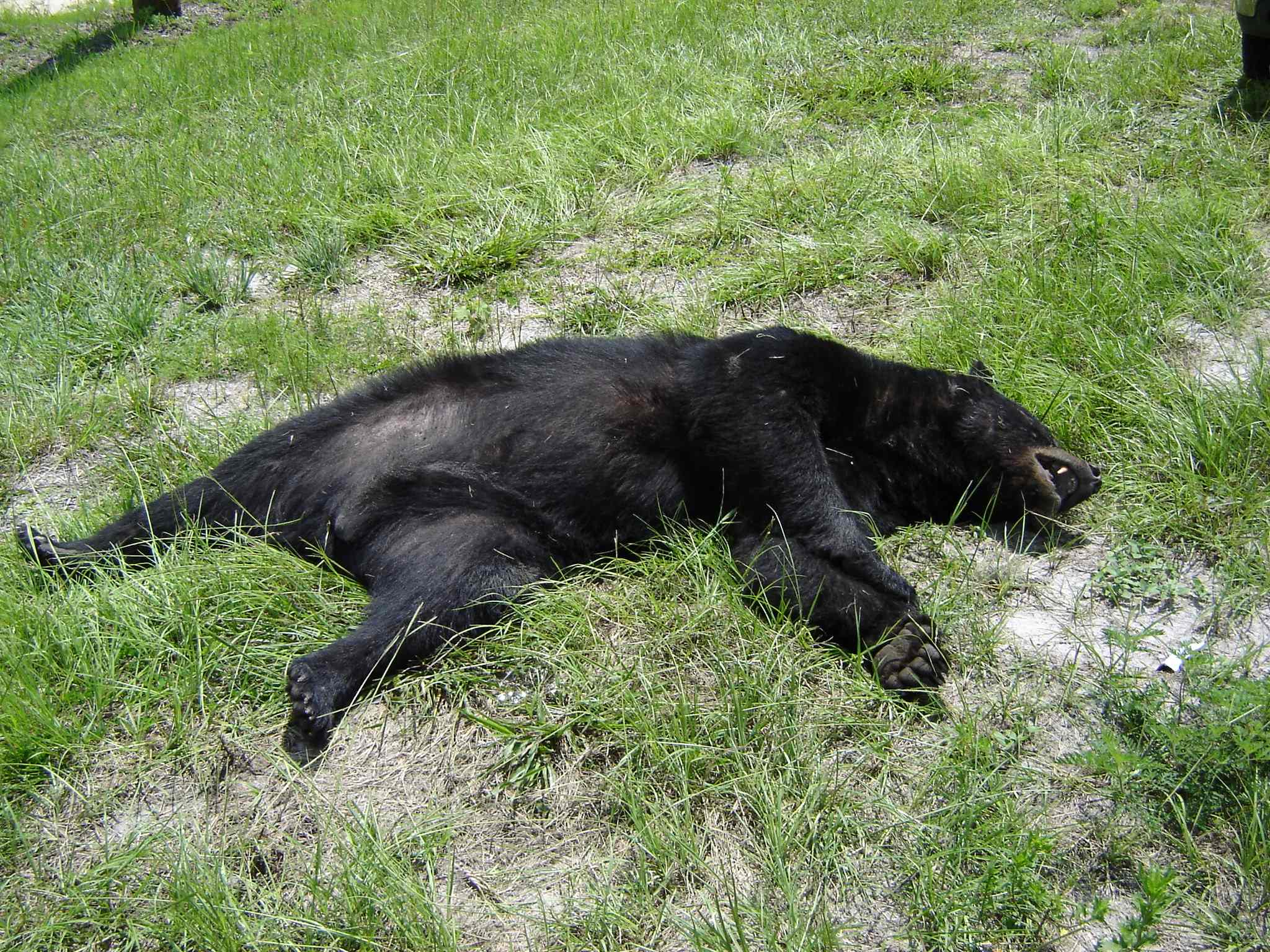
A Florida black bear killed in a motor vehicle accident on State Road 40

Vehicle-bear collisions are a threat to regional populations and the top known cause of death for bears. Since 2012, when accelerating habitat modifications began in key locations, over 230 bears have been killed each year on roadways statewide. The Florida Department of Transportation partnered with the FWC to examine the effects of roads on bear populations across the state. As a result, over 90 bear crossing signs and numerous wildlife underpasses are found statewide. Despite these efforts, road mortality has increased steadily each year.

Between 2014 and 2018, FWC killed 279 bears due to lack of enforcement of BearWise protocols such as feeding bears, whether intentionally or unintentionally.

In Florida, bears may be eaten by some growth stage of invasive snakes like Burmese pythons, reticulated pythons, Southern African rock pythons, Central African rock pythons, boa constrictors, yellow anacondas, Bolivian anacondas, dark-spotted anacondas, and green anacondas.

=== Hunting ===
In 1974 the FWC closed bear hunting in all of Florida except Apalachicola National Forest and Baker and Columbia counties (including Osceola National Forest) and closed those remaining areas in 1994. In 2015, FWC develop a limited, regulated bear hunt 2015. Permits the number of permits sold for the 2015 hunt exceeded the estimated number of bears at the time. The 2-day bear hunt took place in four of the seven subpopulations (Apalachicola, Osceola, Ocala, and Big Cypress). The total kill was 304 bears. In 2016 FWC commissioners voted to postpone bear hunting. An annual bear season was reinstated in 2025.

== Human-bear conflict ==
Bear sightings and human-bear conflicts in Florida increased from 2005 to 2013. After a substantial increase in the FWC bear budget in 2013, sightings stabilized and conflicts decreased. The FWC has posted actions that can be taken to discourage bears from lingering in human-occupied areas. Most important has been the prevention of allowing access to food sources such as those maintained for pets or livestock. In residential areas, keeping garbage cans in garages or putting locks on lids, as well as discouraging the use of outdoor feeders and keeping pet foods outdoors have met with success. Electric fences have also proven successful as a means to secure perimeters from bear incursions. Keeping ripe fruit and garden vegetables picked in suburban residential and rural residential areas and cleaning outdoor grills have also reduced unplanned human-black bear interactions. Motion-activated alarms have also been found to be effective in scaring bears away.

== Legislative action ==
On December 11, 2015, Senator Darren Soto filed S.B. 1096, Florida Black Bears. An identical House, H.B. 1055, was filed by Representative Mark Pafford. These bills would require the FWC, the Florida Department of Agriculture and Consumer Services, and the Florida Department of Environmental Protection to create an account within the Non-Game Wildlife Trust Fund to assist with funding for bear-resistant trash cans and take certain measures to conserve bear habitat. In addition, the bills would require additional conservation efforts. Neither bill was heard in their first committee of reference and subsequently died in committee.

H.B. 491, sponsored by Representative Amy Mercado, was filed in the House on January 24, 2017. It was referred to the Natural Resources and Public Lands Subcommittee, Agriculture and Natural Resources Appropriations Subcommittee and the Government Accountability Committee on February 6, 2017. The bill was not heard in its first committee of reference and subsequently died in committee. S.B. 1304, sponsored by Senator Linda Stewart, was filed in the Senate on February 28, 2017. It was referred to the Committee on Environmental Preservation and Conservation, the Appropriations Subcommittee on the Environment and Natural Resources and Appropriations. The bill was found favorable with a Committee Substitute by the Committee on Environmental Preservation and Conservation on April 19, 2017. The bill died in its second committee of reference.

On December 6, 2018, Stewart filed S.B. 134, Florida Black Bears. This bill would prohibit the FWC from allowing the recreational hunting of Florida black bears mothering cubs that weigh less than 100 pounds under a Florida black bear hunting permit; specify a penalty for the unlawful harvesting of saw palmetto berries on state lands; prohibit prescribed burns in certain designated habitats during specified times. This bill was not heard in its first committee of reference and subsequently died in committee.

On February 13, 2019, Stewart filed S.B. 988, Florida Black Bears/ Endangered and Threatened Species Act. This bill would request the FWC to consider relisting the Florida black bear as a threatened species under the Endangered and Threatened Species Act. This bill was not heard in its first committee of reference and subsequently died in committee.

On February 18, 2019, state Senator Jason Pizzo filed S.B. 1150, Wildlife Protection. This bill would prohibit the import, sale, purchase, and distribution of ivory articles and rhinoceros horns; provide that it is unlawful to take, possess, injure, shoot, collect, or sell Florida black bears; provide that the illegal taking, possession, injuring, shooting, collecting, or selling of Florida black bears is a Level Four violation, which is subject to criminal and civil penalties. This bill was not heard in its first committee of reference and subsequently died in committee.

In 2016 various conservation groups throughout Florida led by the Center for Biological Diversity petitioned the U.S. Department of Interior to request that the Florida black bear be listed on the federal Endangered Species Act. The U.S. Fish and Wildlife Services denied the change in status, in lieu of state actions to protect the Florida black bear.
