= Ochlockonee River State Park =

Preserve in Florida, USA

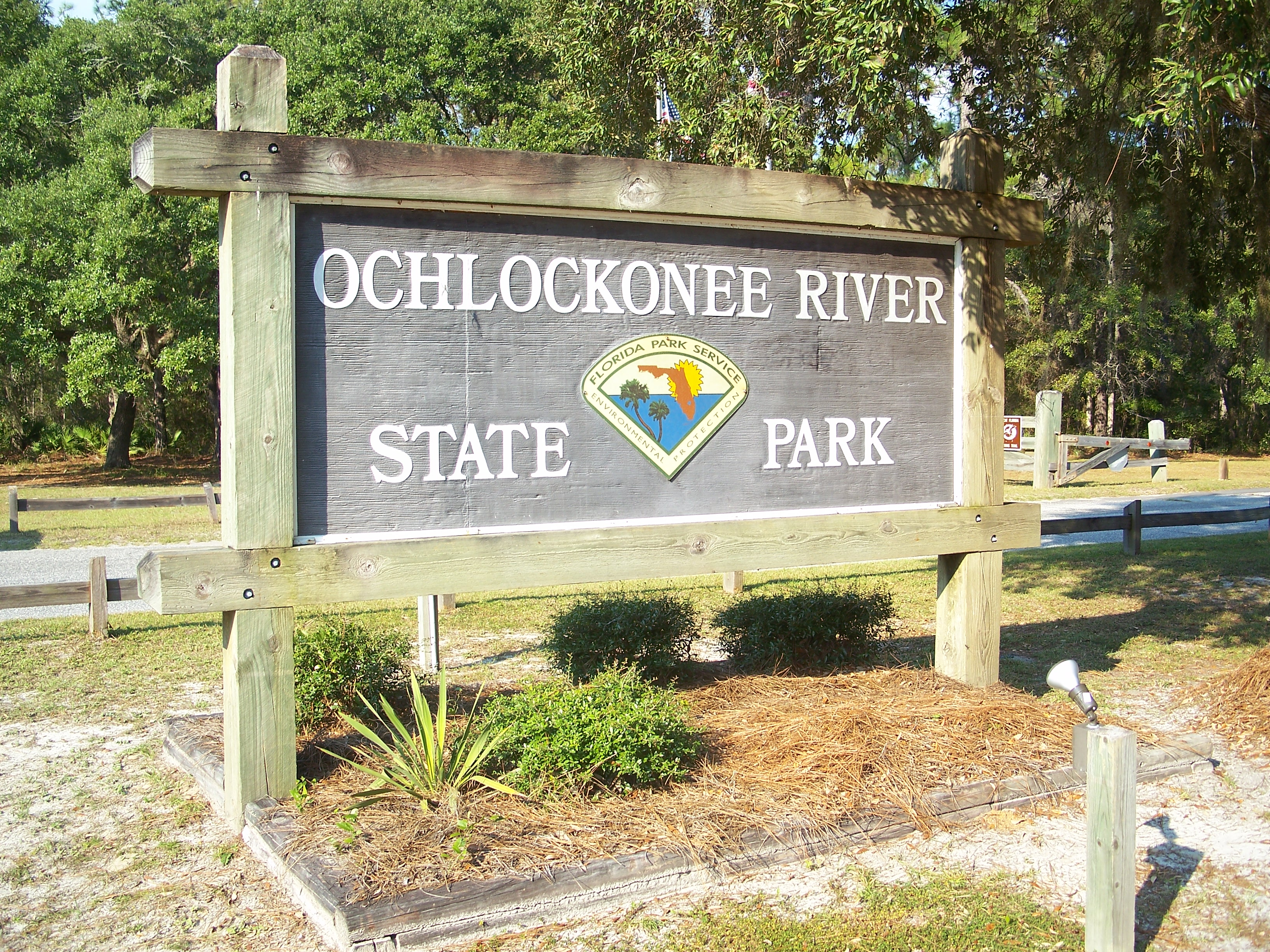
- A view of the old park sign

- Location within Florida Location within the United States
- Interactive map of Ochlockonee River State Park
- Location: Wakulla County, Florida, United States
- Nearest city: Sopchoppy
- Coordinates: 29°59′57″N 84°29′06″W
- Area: 543 acres (220 ha)
- Governing body: Florida Department of Environmental Protection

Ochlockonee River State Park is a Florida State Park located in Wakulla County, Florida, south of the town of Sopchoppy in the Florida Panhandle. Located off U.S. 319 on the Ochlockonee River, just north of the Gulf of Mexico coast, it is surrounded by the Apalachicola National Forest and the St. Marks National Wildlife Refuge, and provides an important habitat for the endangered red-cockaded woodpecker.

== History ==
Established in 1970, Ochlockonee River State Park is located on the Ochlockonee River where it joins with the Sopchoppy River and Dead River to form Ochlockonee Bay, approximately 4 miles (6.4 km) south of Sopchoppy, Florida, and is accessed from U.S. Route 319. The park covers an area of 543 acres (220 ha), while the Apalachicola National Forest and St. Marks National Wildlife Refuge surround the park, producing a net contiguous area of 632,000 acres (256,000 ha) of protected lands. The park was once populated by Native American peoples of the Weeden Island culture in the 300–1000 AD period. During the 1700s, the park area was home to an active turpentine industry, with "cat-faced" pine trees, marked by the turpentine harvesting process, still visible in many locations.

== Ecology ==
Ochlockonee River State Park's primary ecologic biome is East Gulf coastal plain near-coast pine flatwoods, with some live oak thickets also present within the park boundaries; several species of golden wiregrass can be found in abundance within the park. The park is considered to be one of the best remaining examples of a natural flatwoods environment in the state, and it contains a significant habitat for the endangered red-cockaded woodpecker, which nests in longleaf pines. In addition to a large number of other birds, bobcat, American black bear, white-tailed deer, gopher tortoise and fox squirrel are also resident; a population of white-colored squirrels, a genetic mutation of the eastern gray squirrel, are often found at the park as well.

The park's location at the top of Ochlockonee Bay is within a tidal estuary, with fresh water from the Ochlockonee and Sopchoppy Rivers mixing with tidal salt water from the Gulf of Mexico to produce a brackish environment, inhabited by both fresh and saltwater fish. Largemouth bass, bream, catfish, speckled perch, and other fish are found in the brackish river waters, along with blue crabs.

== Recreational activities ==
A number of recreational activities are accommodated at the park, including bicycling, birding, boating, canoeing, fishing, hiking, kayaking, swimming, and wildlife viewing; there are also picnicking areas, and the park has full camping facilities available, with 30 campground sites being located in the park. The Ochlockonee River Nature Trail and Pine Flatwoods Nature Trail are located in the park, the latter having a 2.6-mile (4.2 km) hiking distance.

The park also has two paddling loops, the Dead River Sopchoppy Loop Paddling Trail and Bear Creek Paddling Trail, each 7.5 miles (12.1 km) long.

== Gallery ==
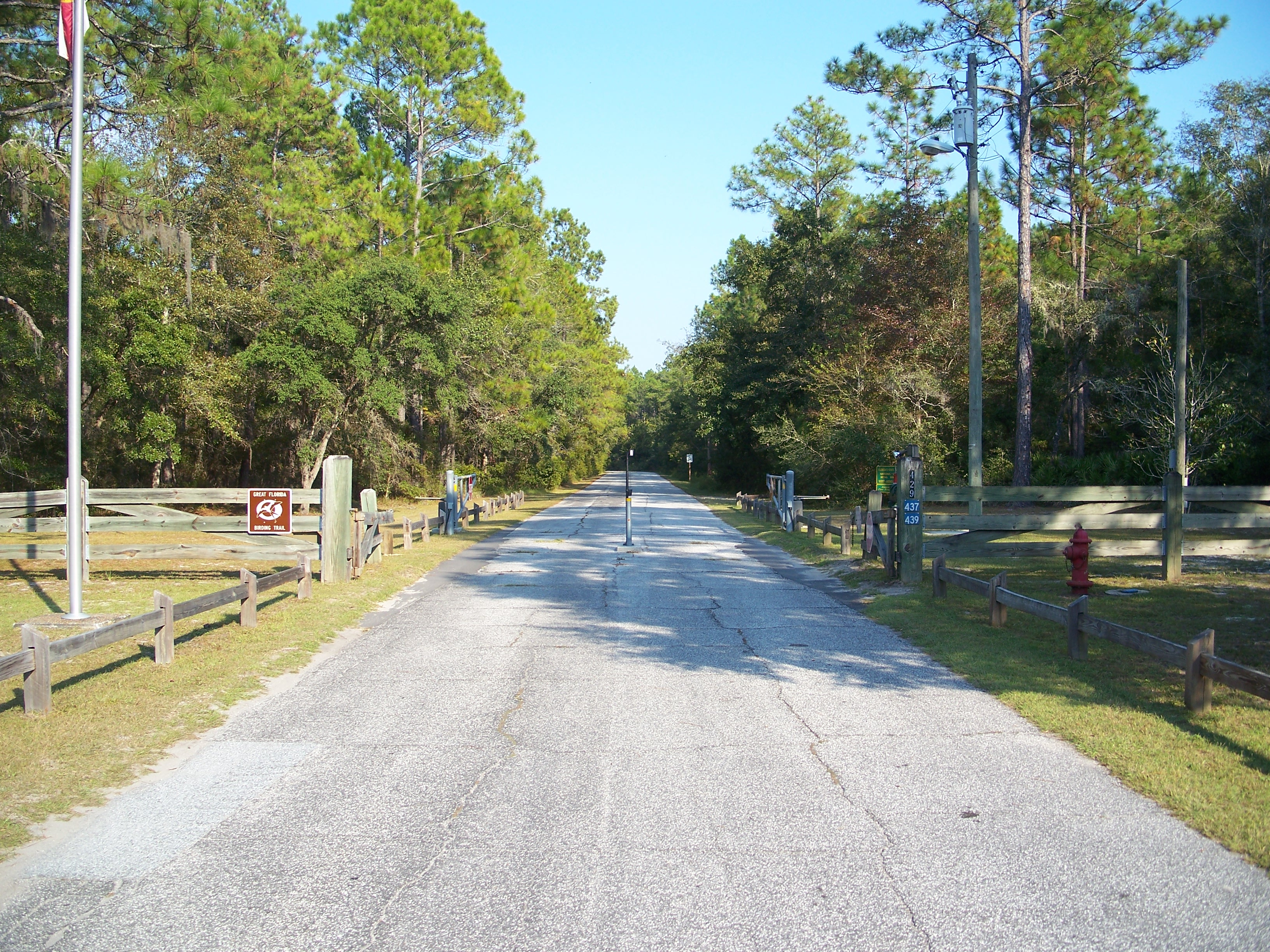

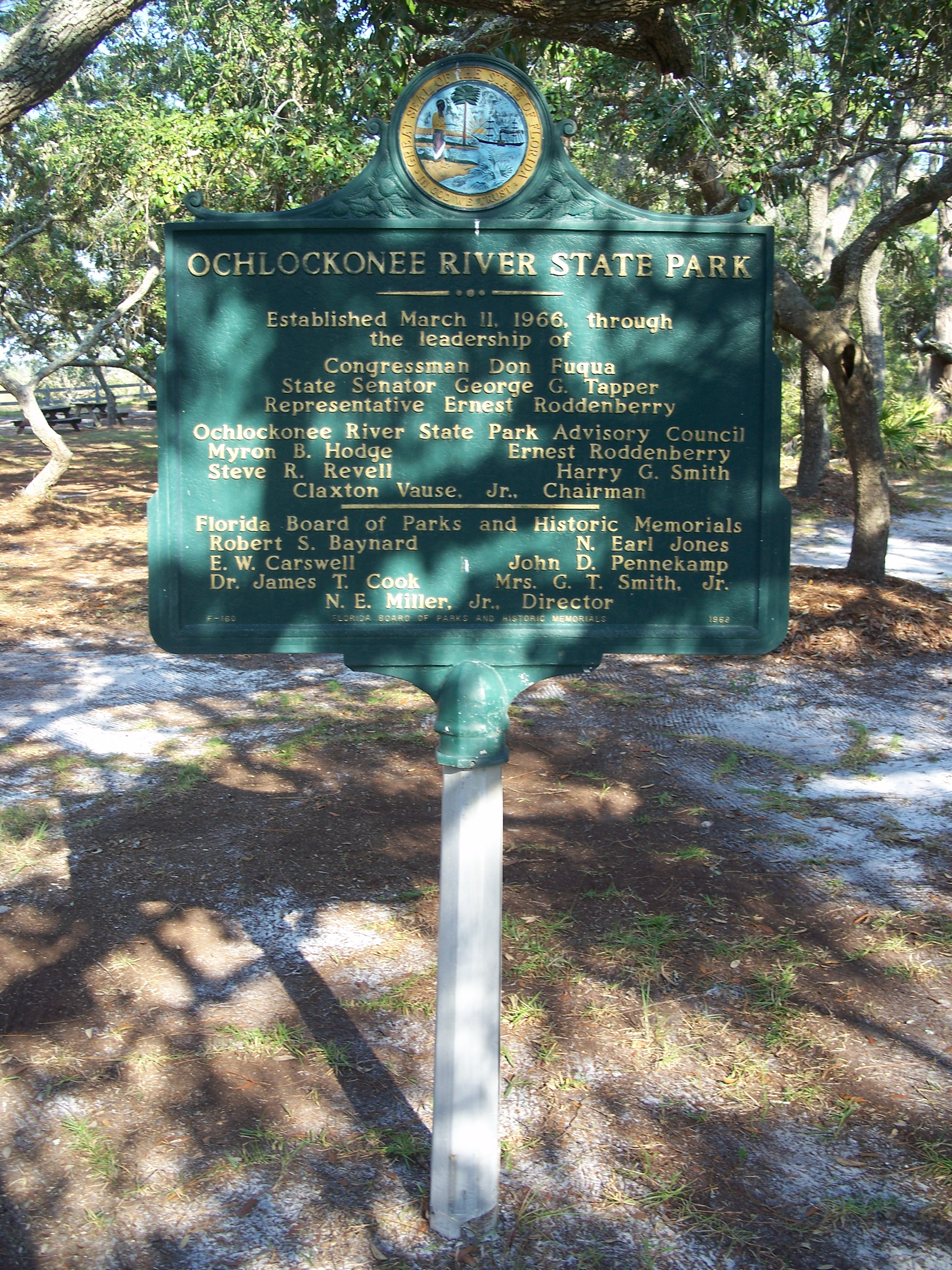

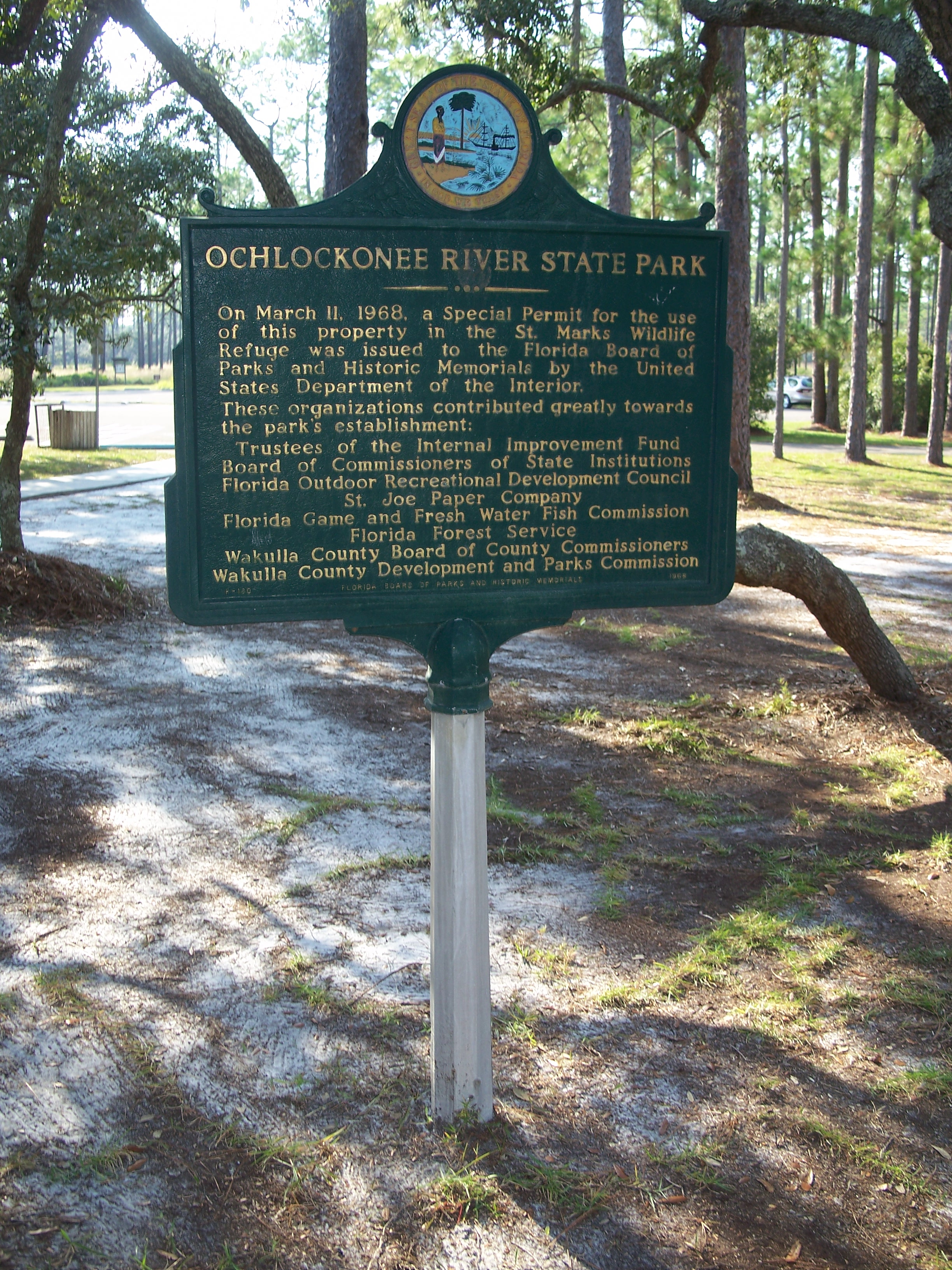

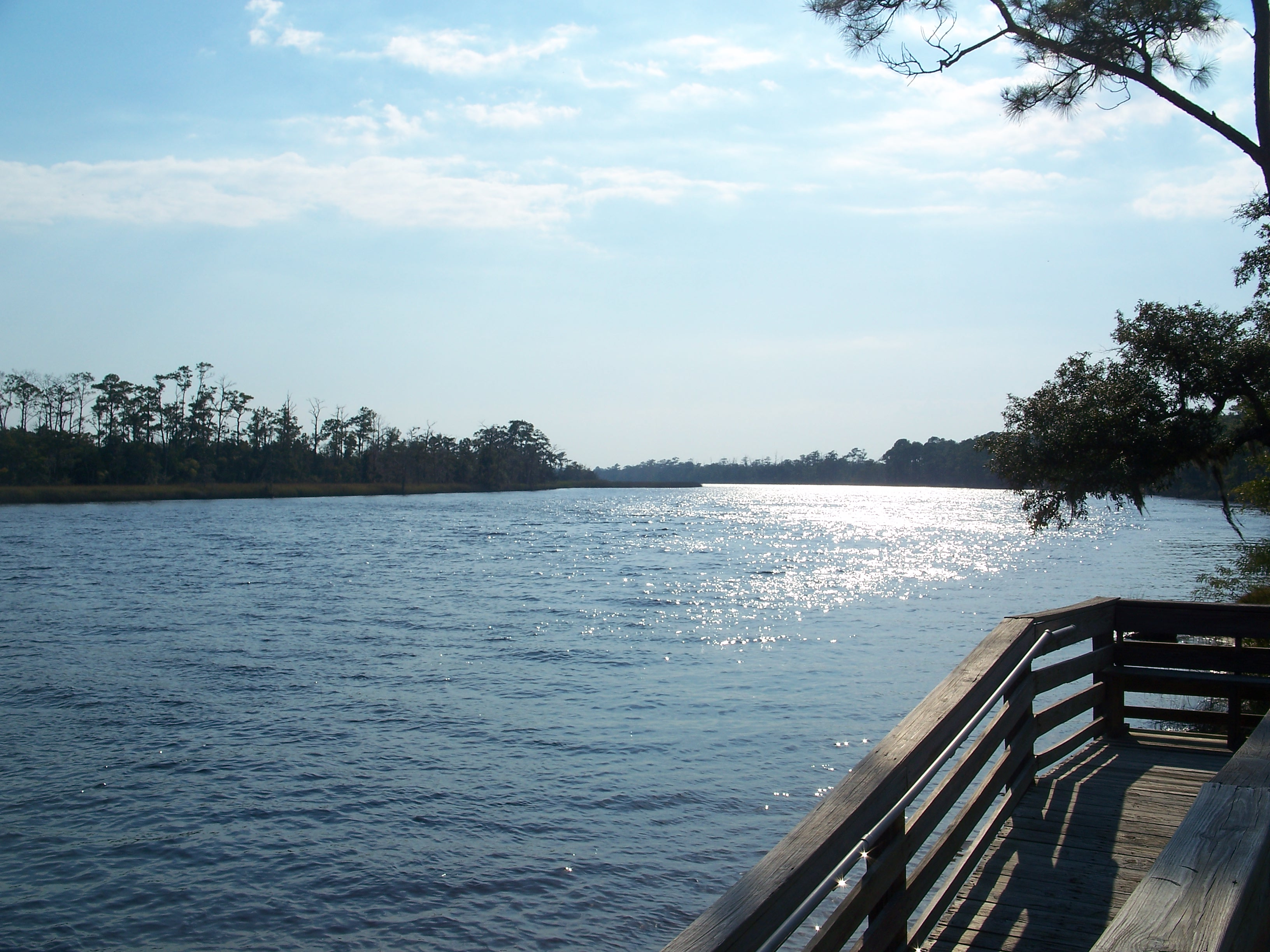

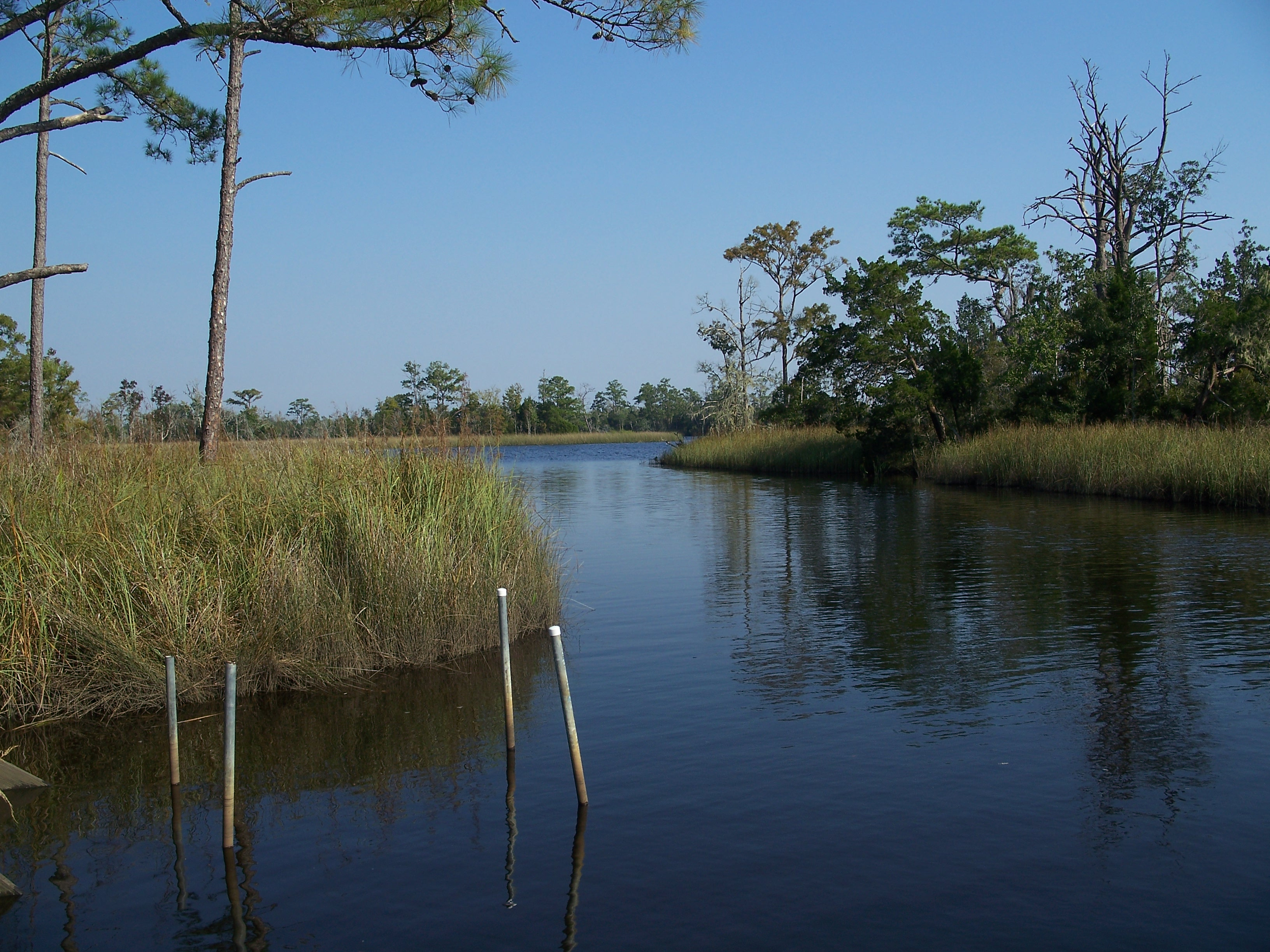

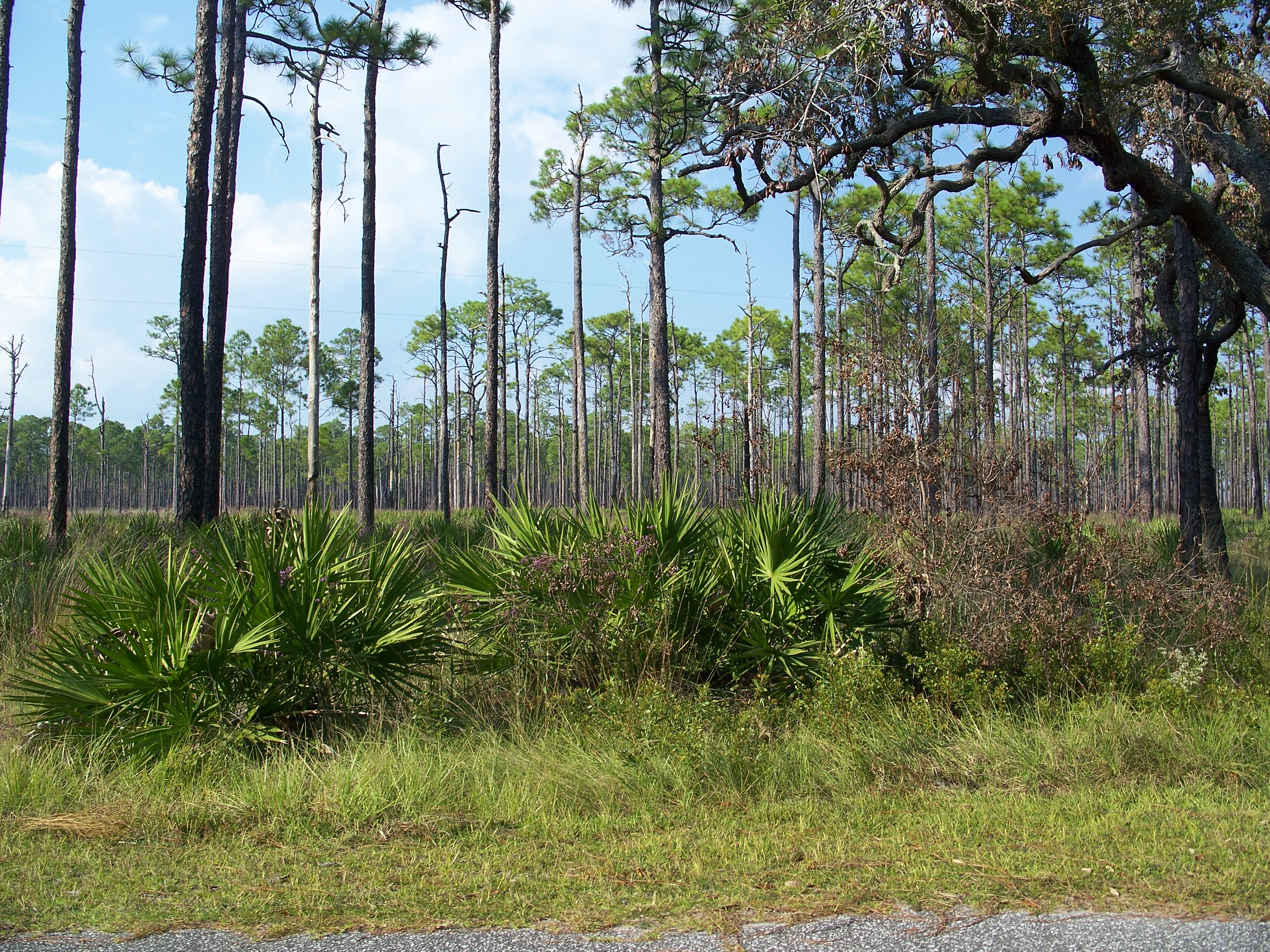

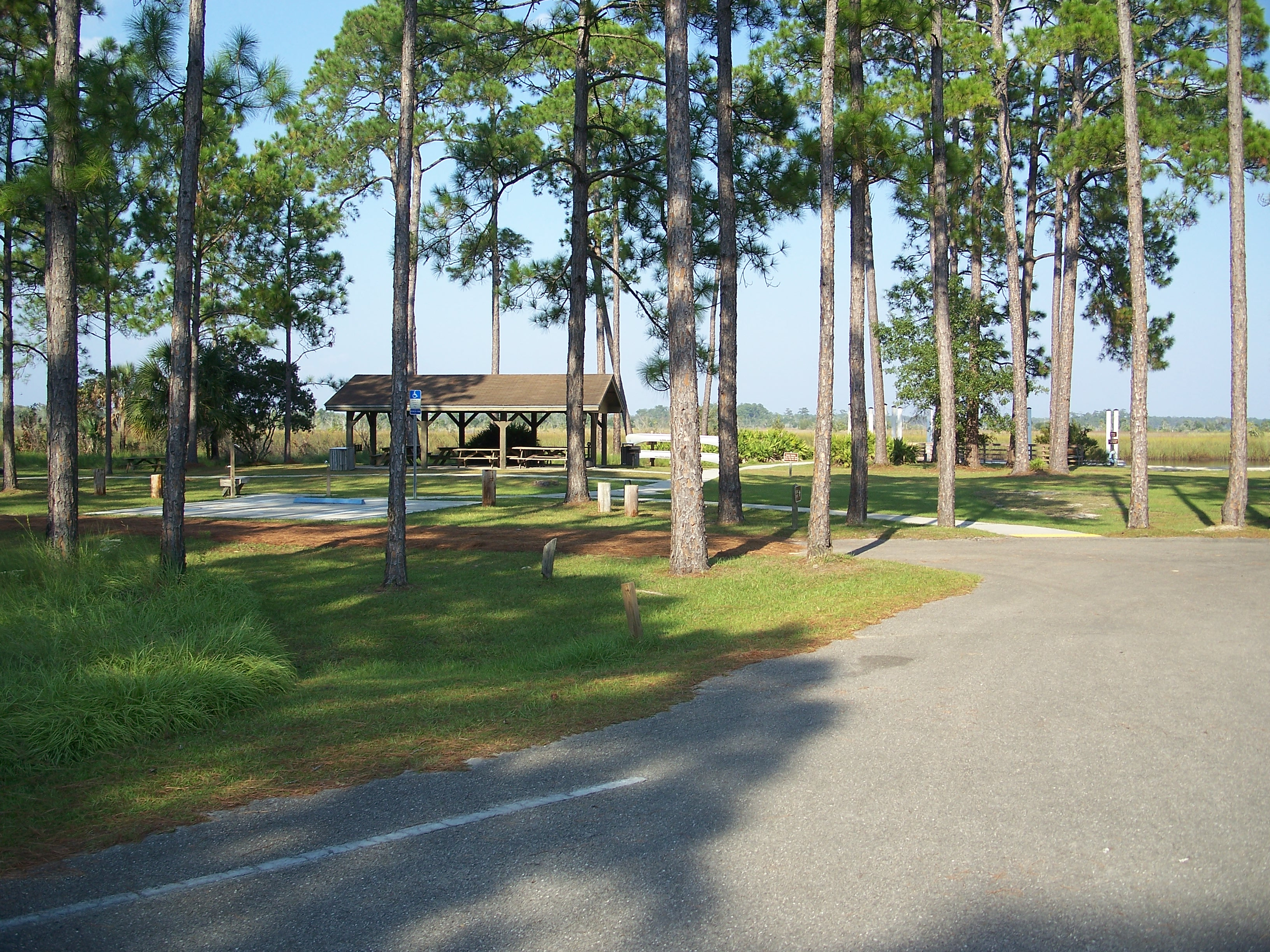
