= Bradwell Bay Wilderness =

Protected area in Florida, United States

- IUCN category Ib (wilderness area)
- Location within Florida Location within the United States
- Location: Wakulla County, Florida, USA
- Nearest city: Sopchoppy, Florida
- Coordinates: 30.178812°N 84.5576836°W
- Area: 24,602 acres (9,956 ha)
- Established: 3 January 1975
- Governing body: US Forest Service

The Bradwell Bay Wilderness is part of the United States National Wilderness Preservation System, located in the Florida panhandle adjacent to the Apalachicola National Forest. The 24,602 acre (100 km^{2}) wilderness was established on 3 January 1975 by the Eastern Wilderness Act. "Bay" in this case means "a recess of land, partly surrounded by hills", which, in this particular instance, is mostly titi swamp and standing water. The Sopchoppy River marks the Bradwell Bay's eastern edge.

A section of the Florida Trail, which usually requires wading through swampy terrain, passes through the wilderness.

== Flora ==
Titi trees, longleaf pines, loblolly pine and wire grass make up much of the swamp. The wilderness also contains a 100 acres (40 ha) old-growth slash pine - swamp black gum swamp.

== Fauna ==
White-tailed deer, black bears, and alligators are some of the animals that can be seen here.
