= Southern coastal plain nonriverine basin swamp =

Ecological zone of southeastern US

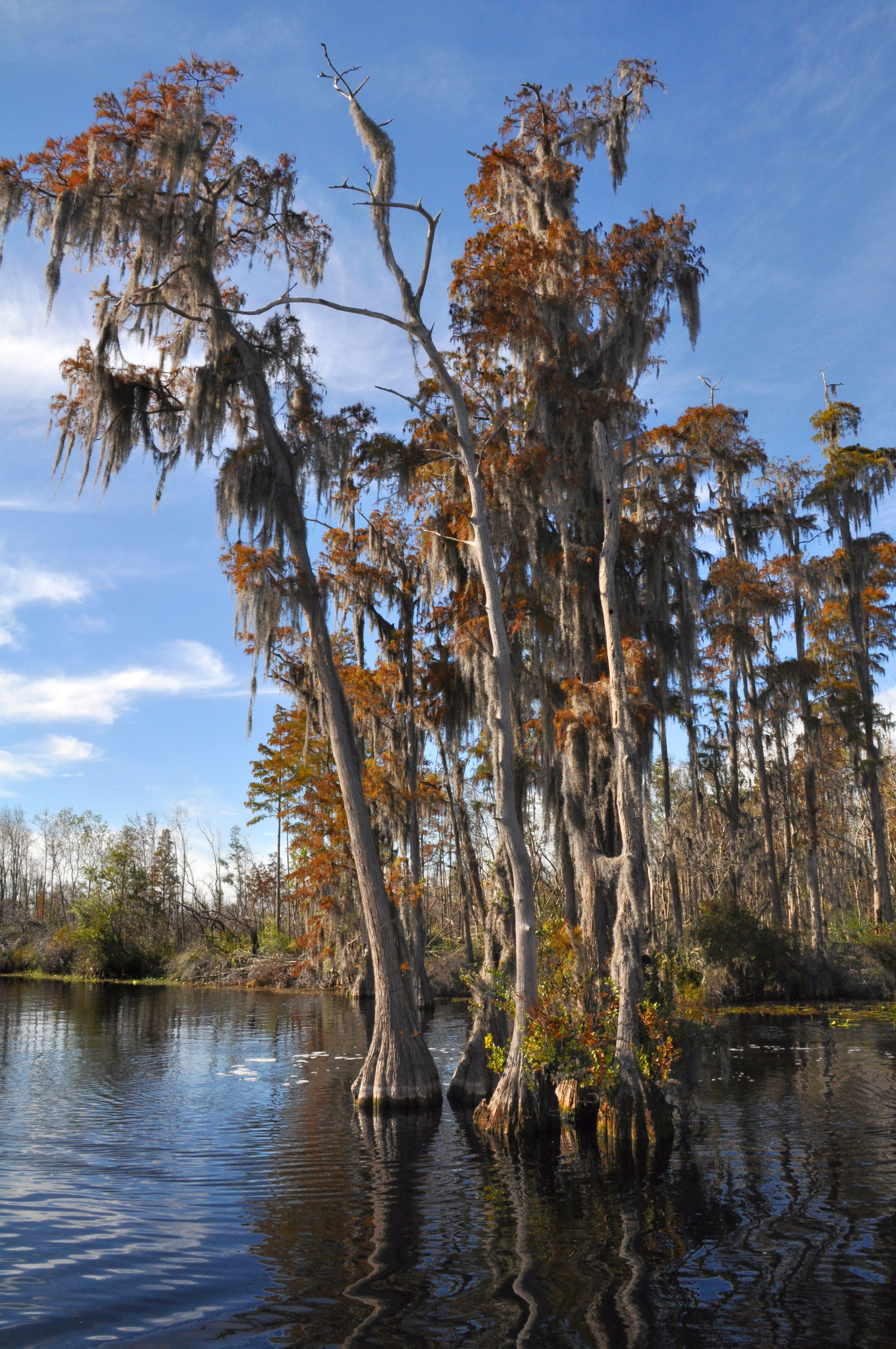
Nonriverine basin swamp in Okefenokee Swamp.

The Southern coastal plain nonriverine basin swamp is a wetland system found along the southern Atlantic Plain and the eastern Gulf Coastal Plain, and extending into the Florida peninsula. These wetlands occur in large, seasonally flooded depressions away from rivers. Sites are often forested by trees including bald cypress (Taxodium distichum), swamp tupelo (Nyssa biflora), evergreen shrubs, and hardwoods. Slash pine (Pinus elliottii) is sometimes found. Characteristic shrubs include buckwheat tree (Cliftonia monophylla), swamp cyrilla (Cyrilla racemiflora), fetterbush lyonia (Lyonia lucida), and laurelleaf greenbrier (Smilax laurifolia).

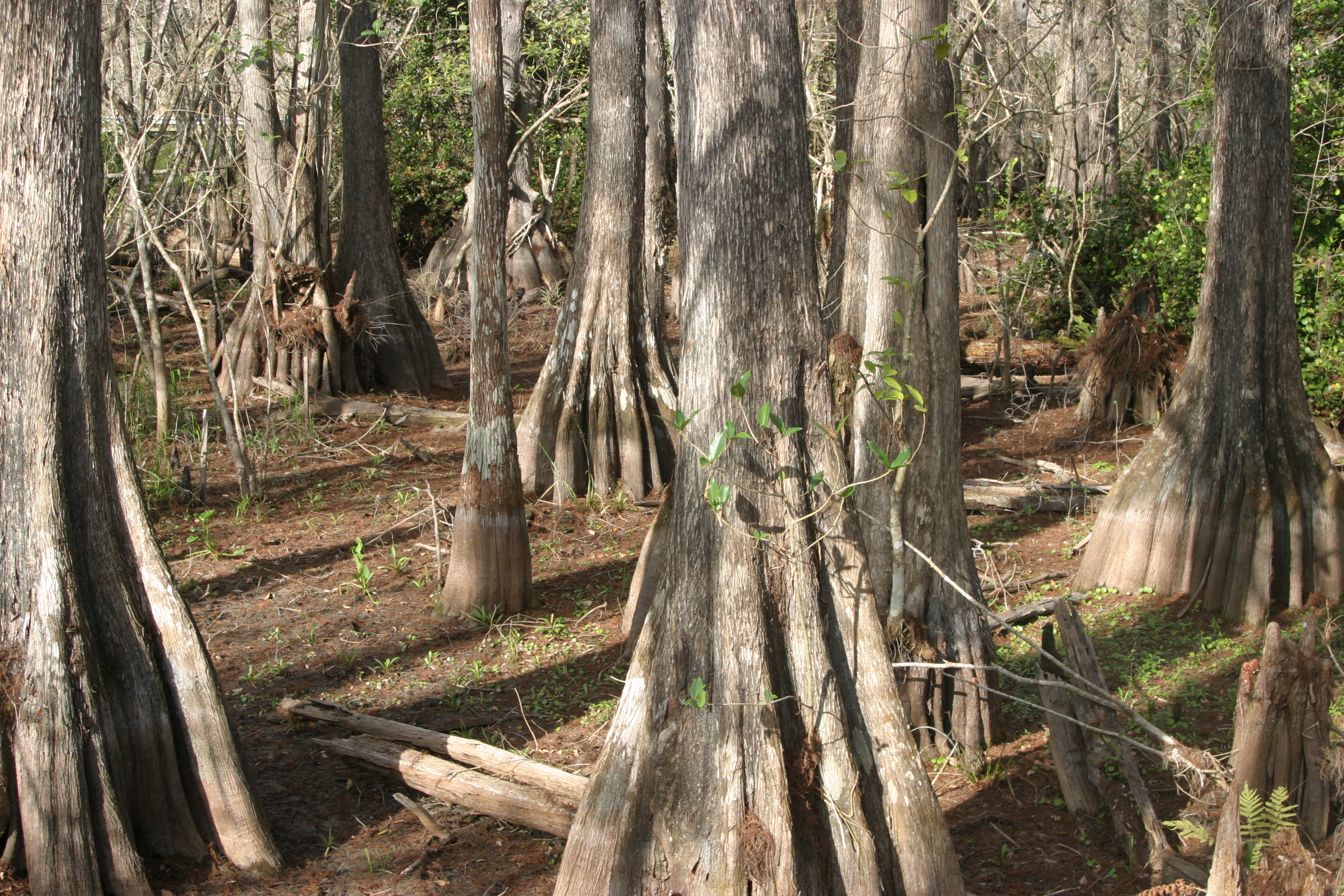
Bald Cypress in winter.
