= Ocklochnee =

Ocklochnee may refer to:

- Ochlocknee, Georgia
- Ochlockonee River, in Georgia and Florida
- Ochlockonee River State Park
