= Titi swamp =

Swamp habitat in U.S. states of Florida and Georgia

Titi swamp is a swamp habitat in Florida and Georgia where species of Cliftonia monophylla ("Buckwheat tree" or "Black titi") and/or Cyrilla racemiflora ("Ironwood" or "white titi") predominate. Titi swamps are characterized by their nutrient rich and wet soil that is ideal for the growth of Cliftonia monophylia and Cyrilla racemiflora, which are both perennial trees/shrubs.

The town of Ty Ty in Tift County, Georgia, is named after one of the numerous small creeks named, in turn, for the presence of these scrubby trees in their boggy fringes.
