= Mud Swamp/New River Wilderness =

Wilderness area in Florida, United States

- IUCN category Ib (wilderness area)
- Location within Florida Location within the United States
- Location: Liberty County, Florida, USA
- Nearest city: Sumatra, Florida
- Coordinates: 30°03′26″N 84°52′25″W
- Area: 8,090 acres (33 km^{2})
- Established: September 28, 1984
- Governing body: U.S. Forest Service

The Mud Swamp/New River Wilderness is part of Apalachicola National Forest, located in the Florida panhandle. The 8,090-acre (33 km^{2}) refuge was established on September 28, 1984.

Mud Swamp consists of very poorly drained clay-rich soil, holding more water than nearby Bradwell Bay Wilderness. It has numerous scattered small islands. Biting insects, black bears and alligators make the swamp their home.

The New River (Florida Panhandle) passes through it and is lined with Atlantic white cedar. It enters from the north and flows through cypress and gum swamps.
