= Sopchoppy River =

River in Florida, United States

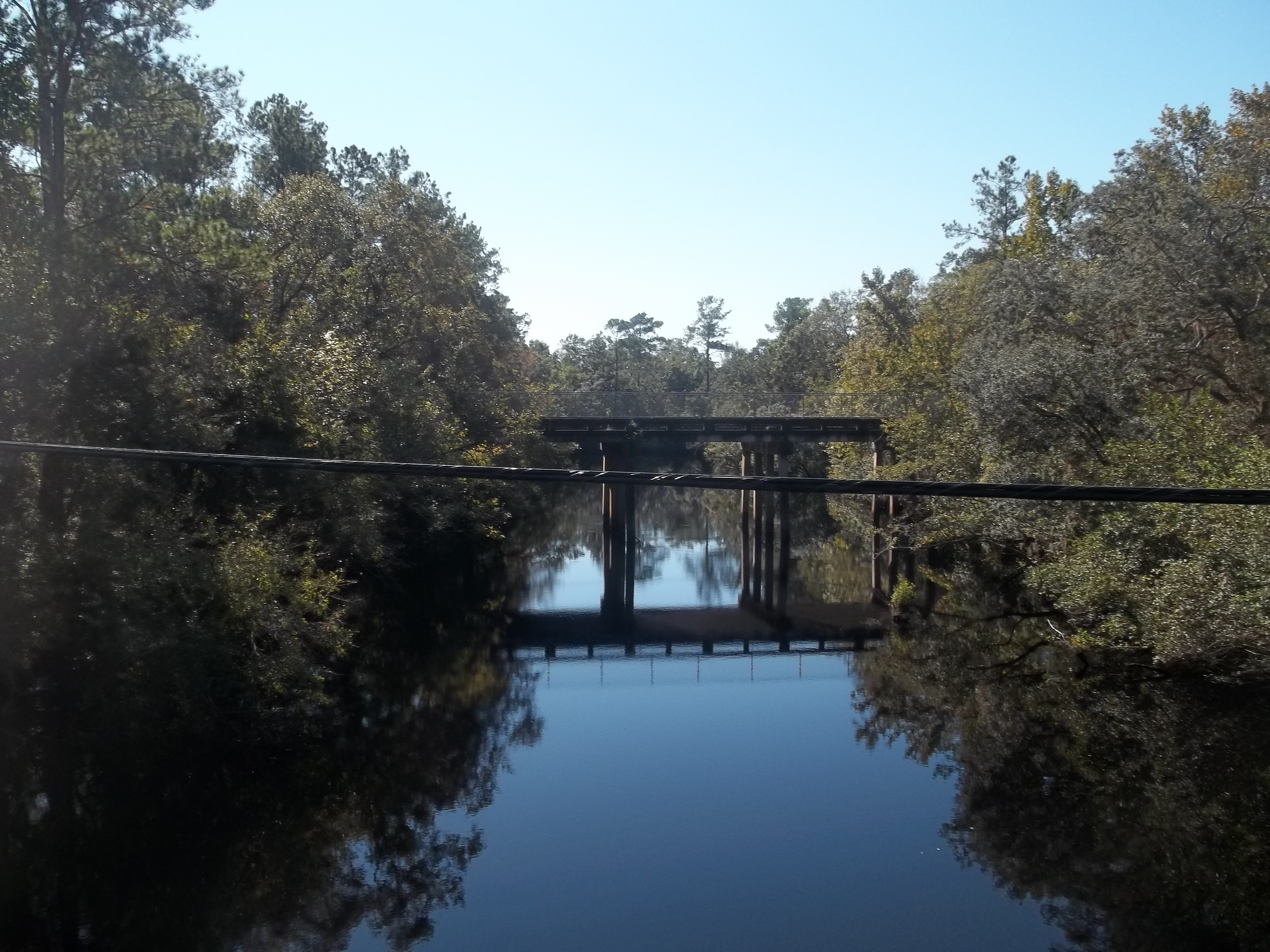

Location
- Country: United States
- State: Florida
- Counties: Leon, Wakulla
- District: NWFWMD

Physical characteristics
- Source: East Branch
  - location: Apalachicola National Forest, Leon County, Florida
  - coordinates: 30°18′29″N 84°34′38″W
- Mouth: Ochlockonee Bay
  - location: Surf, Wakulla County, Florida
  - coordinates: 29°59′23″N 84°25′56″W
- Length: 46 mi (74 km)
- Basin size: 330 mi^{2} (850 km^{2})
- Discharge
  - location: Sopchoppy, Florida
  - average: 5.6 m^{3}/s (200 cu ft/s)
  - minimum: 1.8 m^{3}/s (64 cu ft/s)
  - maximum: 8.9 m^{3}/s (310 cu ft/s)

Basin features
- Tributaries
  - left: Buckhorn Creek
  - right: Monkey Creek

The Sopchoppy River is a minor river in the Florida Big Bend. A tributary of the Ochlockonee River, it is approximately 46 miles (74 km) in length and nearly entirely within Wakulla County, with only a small part of its East Branch entering Leon County.

The river flows through the Apalachicola National Forest and the Bradwell Bay Wilderness, in addition to through the town of Sopchoppy, and a canoe trail 15 miles (24 km) in length is designated along its length from the Oak Park Cemetery Bridge to US 319.

== List of crossings ==
Crossing	Carries	Image	Location	Coordinates
	Forest Road 306		(East Branch)	30°17′58″N 84°34′50″W
	Forest Road 344		(West Branch)	30°15′56″N 84°37′07″W
	Forest Road 309		(West Branch) (East Branch)	30°15′32″N 84°35′52″W; 30°15′19″N 84°35′23″W
Convergence of East and West Branches
	Forest Highway 13			30°13′50″N 84°32′17″W
	Forest Road 329			30°10′13″N 84°29′54″W
Oak Park Cemetery Bridge	Forest Road 343			30°07′47″N 84°29′37″W
	Mount Beasor Road			30°05′52″N 84°31′09″W
	CR 375; Smith Creek Road		Sopchoppy	30°03′49″N 84°30′02″W
	CR 22; Rose Street		Sopchoppy	30°03′46″N 84°30′03″W
	US 319; Sopchoppy Highway			30°01′20″N 84°25′59″W
