= East Gulf coastal plain large river floodplain forest =

Ecological region of the southeastern US

The east Gulf coastal plain's large river floodplain forest is a type of forested wetland found in the eastern and upper Gulf Coastal Plain in Alabama, Florida, Georgia, Kentucky, Missouri, and Tennessee. In particular, these forests can be found along the Apalachicola, Alabama, Tombigbee, Pascagoula, and Pearl rivers.

Natural features along these large rivers, such as levees, point bars, meanders, oxbow lakes, and sloughs, result in a wide variety of plant communities, ranging from bottomland forests to shrublands to prairies.

Common trees include bald cypress (Taxodium distichum), green ash (Fraxinus pennsylvanica), sweetgum (Liquidambar styraciflua), water tupelo (Nyssa aquatica), swamp chestnut oak (Quercus michauxii), willow oak (Quercus phellos), swamp laurel oak (Quercus laurifolia), and hornbeam (Carpinus caroliniana).
