= East Gulf coastal plain savanna and wet prairie =

Ecological region of southeastern US

The East Gulf coastal plain savanna and wet prairie is a herbaceous wetland community found in the eastern Gulf Coastal Plain, in the states of Mississippi, Alabama, and Georgia. It is also known as a "lush grassland", "grass-sedge savannah", or "wet savanna".

This plan community takes the form of a thick layer of grasses and sedges growing on low plains with poorly drained soils. It is saturated for several months of the year and is maintained by frequent fires.

Herbaceous plants include wiregrass (Aristida beyrichiana) and various species of beaksedge (Rhynchospora spp.). Scattered shrubs include southern wax myrtle (Morella cerifera). Trees, if any, include slash pine (Pinus elliottii) or longleaf pine (Pinus palustris).
