= East Gulf coastal plain near-coast pine flatwoods =

Ecological region of the southeastern US

The east Gulf coastal plain near-coast pine flatwoods are forests and woodlands found in the eastern Gulf Coastal Plain, in the states of Alabama, Florida, Georgia, Louisiana, and Mississippi. They take the form of forests and woodlands on broad, sandy flatlands. Fires are naturally frequent, occurring every one to four years.

Typical trees are longleaf pine (Pinus palustris) or slash pine (Pinus elliottii). Understory vegetation can be open and grassy or dense and shrubby, depending on fire history. Shrubs include swamp titi (Cyrilla racemiflora), gallberry (Ilex coriacea), Appalachia tea (Ilex glabra), fetterbush lyonia (Lyonia lucida), and saw palmetto (Serenoa repens).

== See also ==
- Flatwoods
