= Southern coastal plain blackwater river floodplain forest =

Ecological zone of southeastern US

The southern coastal plain blackwater river floodplain forest is a forest system found in Alabama, Mississippi, Florida, and Georgia. These forests occur in the drainages of blackwater rivers and streams whose dark water is caused by high levels of tannins, particulates, and other materials accumulated as they drain through swamps and marshes. The water has little mineral sediment and few suspended clay particles.

Typical trees of these forests include bald cypress (Taxodium distichum), water tupelo (Nyssa aquatica), swamp tupelo (Nyssa biflora), sweetbay (Magnolia virginiana), and Atlantic white cedar (Chamaecyparis thyoides). Common shrubs are buckwheat tree (Cliftonia monophylla) and swamp cyrilla (Cyrilla racemiflora). Netted chain fern (Lorinseria areolata) is also found here.
