= Southern coastal plain hydric hammock =

Ecological zone of southeastern US

The southern coastal plain hydric hammock is a wetland hammock community found on the flat lowlands of the southern and outermost parts of the Atlantic Coastal Plain in the states of Georgia, Florida, and Alabama. These forests of evergreen and deciduous hardwood trees occur near the floodplains of spring-fed rivers with relatively constant flows, usually over limestone substrates. They are usually found on gentle slopes just above swamps, marshes or wet prairies. In places, they can form large areas of broad, shallow wetlands.

Hydric hammocks are found in scattered locations in Florida north of Lake Okeechobee, with concentrations along the upper St. Johns River, the Atlantic coast of northeastern Florida, and particularly along the Big Bend section of the Gulf Coast of Florida, from Aripeka to St. Marks.

Common trees include eastern red cedar (Juniperus virginiana), elm (Ulmus americana), sweetbay magnolia (Magnolia virginiana), red maple (Acer rubrum), swamp laurel oak (Quercus laurifolia), southern live oak (Quercus virginiana), sweetgum (Liquidambar styraciflua), sugarberry (Celtis laevigata), and cabbage palm (Sabal palmetto). Dahoon holly (Ilex cassine) is a typical shrub.
