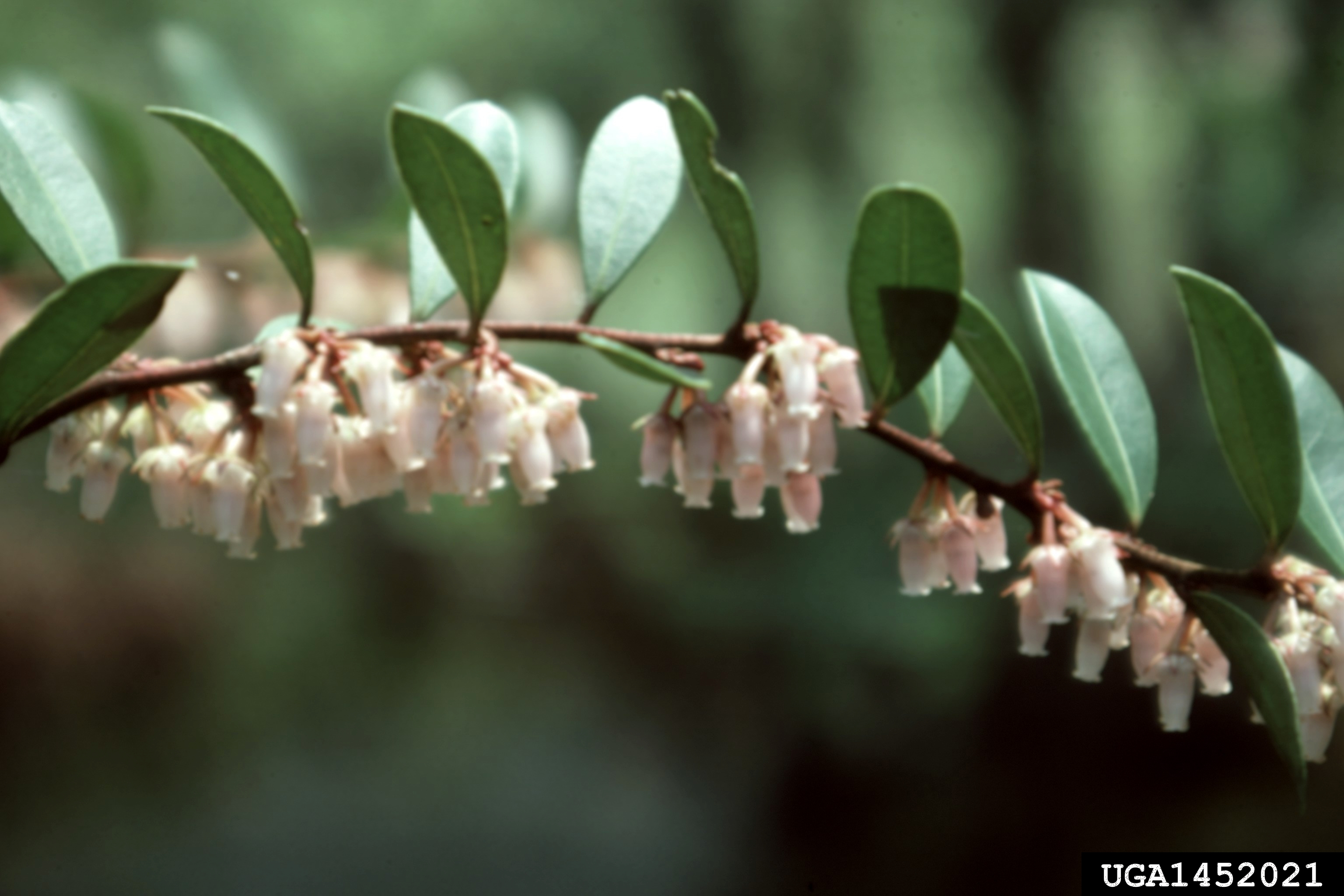

Conservation status
- Secure (NatureServe)

Scientific classification
- Kingdom: Plantae
- Clade: Tracheophytes
- Clade: Angiosperms
- Clade: Eudicots
- Clade: Asterids
- Order: Ericales
- Family: Ericaceae
- Genus: Lyonia
- Species: L. lucida

Binomial name
- Lyonia lucida (Lam.) K.Koch

= Lyonia lucida =

Species of flowering plant

Lyonia lucida is a species of flowering plant in the family Ericaceae known by the common names fetterbush lyonia, hurrahbush, and staggerbush. Other plants may also be called fetterbush. This broadleaved evergreen plant grows on the coastal plain of the southeastern United States from Virginia to Florida to Louisiana. It also occurs in Cuba.

This shrub can grow to 4 to 5 meters in height and just as wide. The plant has long rhizomes that can sprout up new plants, forming a colony. The leathery leaves are alternately arranged on scaly twigs. They are up to 10.5 centimeters long by 5.5 wide and are oval in shape. The inflorescence is a fascicle of cylindrical flowers which are usually pink but may be white or red. The fruit is a capsule. The plant mostly reproduces vegetatively, but it also reproduces by seed. In soils poor in nutrients it does not flower and reproduces only by sprouting from the rhizome.

This plant is a common species, growing in shrubby bogs, wet savannas, conifer swamps, and scrub. There are large populations in saw palmetto prairie habitat. It is common in the Okefenokee Swamp. It grows in dry habitat but it is usually found in wet places, including habitat that is periodically flooded. It prefers acidic, saturated soils rich in organic matter, such as those in cypress swamps. It may grow in shady understories but it does well in full sun. Overstory species in the habitat may include Atlantic white cedar (Chamaecyparis thyoides), sweet bay (Magnolia virginiana), red bay (Persea borbonia), loblolly bay (Gordonia lasianthus), tupelo (Nyssa spp.) and pines (Pinus spp.). It shares the understory with other plants such as sweetbells (Eubotrys racemosa), highbush blueberry (Vaccinium corymbosum), sweet pepperbush (Clethera alnifolia), titi (Cyrilla racemiflora), laurelleaf greenbrier (Smilax laurifolia), honeycup (Zenobia pulverulenta), and oaks (Quercus spp.).

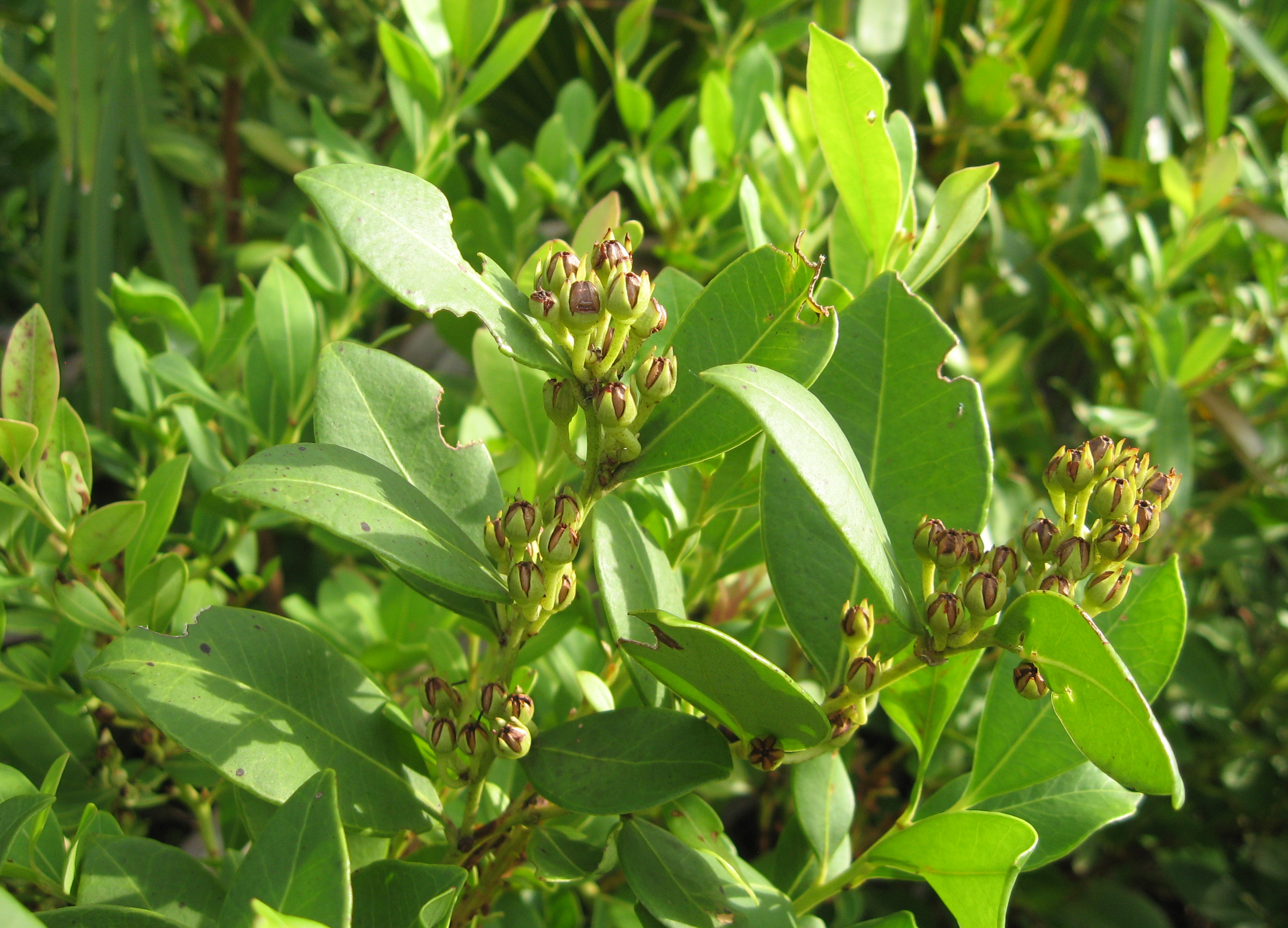
Lyonia lucida in fruit with capsules
