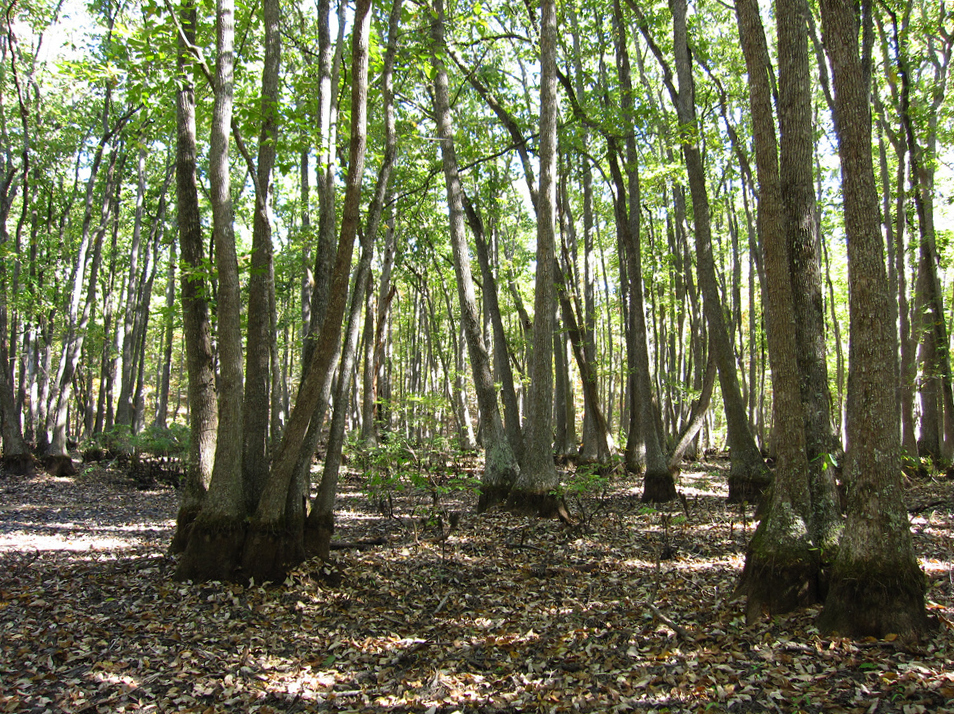

Conservation status
- Least Concern (IUCN 3.1)

Scientific classification
- Kingdom: Plantae
- Clade: Tracheophytes
- Clade: Angiosperms
- Clade: Eudicots
- Clade: Asterids
- Order: Cornales
- Family: Nyssaceae
- Genus: Nyssa
- Species: N. biflora

Binomial name
- Nyssa biflora Walter

= Nyssa biflora =

Species of tree

Nyssa biflora, commonly referred to as the swamp tupelo, or swamp black-gum is a species of tupelo that lives in wetland habitats in the United States.

== Taxonomy ==
Some authors treat swamp tupelo as a variety, Nyssa sylvatica var. biflora, of black tupelo (N. sylvatica). Genetic data suggest that Nyssa sylvatica and N. biflora are separate species, and Zhou et al. (2018) further propose that the northwest Florida coastal endemic N. ursina is a subspecies of N. biflora.

== Description ==
Swamp tupelo can be distinguished from black tupelo by its smaller leaves, which are less than 2.5 or 3 inches (6.4 or 7.6 cm), more commonly oblanceolate or narrow elliptic than the broader black gum leaves, although the morphology is variable. The seeds are more deeply grooved than those of black tupelo. Compared to water tupelo, N. aquatica, swamp tupelo also has much smaller leaves. The crown of the tree appears narrow and irregular. Under optimal growth conditions, swamp tupelo can reach heights of 100 feet (30 m) or more. The base of the tree is commonly enlarged into a buttress as the tree grows larger and the bark bears fissures irregularly.

== Geographic distribution and habitat ==
Swamp tupelo grows chiefly in the coastal plains from New Jersey, Delaware, eastern Maryland, and southeastern Virginia, south to southern Florida and west to eastern Texas. Its range extends north up the Mississippi Valley to southern Arkansas and west and south Tennessee.

The swamp tupelo grows in humid warm climates. It thrives in flood areas and is seldom found on sites that are not inundated much of the growing season. Swamp tupelo grows in headwater swamps, strands, ponds, river bottoms, bays, estuaries, and low coves. Normally it does not grow in the deeper parts of swamps or overflow river bottoms.

The type of water regime is more important to growth of swamp tupelo than the soil type. Best growth is achieved on sites where the soil is continuously saturated with very shallow moving water. Growth can be reduced as much as 50 percent when the water is stagnant, as in ponds. Intermittent flooding, with periodic drying cycles, or continuous deep flooding even by moving water, also reduces growth.

== Reproduction and ecology ==
The swamp tupelo has minute greenish-white flowers that appear in the spring with the leaves, usually in late April. Insects, primarily bees, are the major pollinating vector, but pollen is also spread by wind. The fruit, a drupe, changes from green to a dark blue as it ripens, usually in early November. Fruits are eaten by black bears, small mammals and birds, contributing to seed dispersion. The fruits do not float, unlike those of N. aquatica. The seeds normally overwinter and germinate the following spring. Germination does not take place under water, but submerged seeds germinate once the water subsides below the soil surface. Germination is rapid in moist, drained conditions at 21 °C (70 °F) and higher. After germination, seedlings must grow rapidly to keep the apex and leaves above water, because prolonged submergence during active growth will kill them. Submergence during the dormant season, however, has no adverse effect.

Swamp tupelo normally develops a taproot and has a swollen base to the mean height of the growing season water level. Water roots, which develop under flooded conditions, help support the tree and capture nutrients. These specialized roots tolerate high carbon dioxide concentrations, oxidize the rhizosphere, and carry on anaerobic respiration. Thus, they are the key to the species' ability to thrive under flooded conditions.

Trees and shrubs commonly associated with swamp tupelo are red maple (Acer rubrum), buttonbush (Cephalanthus occidentalis), buckwheat-tree (Cliftonia monophylla), dogwood (Cornus spp.), swamp cyrilla (Cyrilla racemiflora), swamp-privet (Forestiera acuminata), Carolina ash (Fraxinus caroliniana), loblolly-bay (Gordonia lasianthus), dahoon (Ilex cassine), inkberry (I. glabra), yaupon (I. vomitoria), fetterbush lyonia (Lyonia lucida), and bayberry (Myrica spp.).
