= Brow =

Brow may refer to:

- Eyebrow, an area of thick, delicate hairs above the eye
- The brow ridge, between the eyes and forehead
- Entryway for boarding the ship similar to a gangplank
- Brow, Dumfries and Galloway, hamlet in Scotland
- A low place in the roof of a mine, giving insufficient headroom
- The Brow, a band from Fremantle, Western Australia
- Brow Point, the western entrance headland of Blue Whale Harbour on the north coast of South Georgia
- Brow Monument and Brow Monument Trail, Coconino County, Arizona, located in the Kaibab National Forest

== People with the surname ==
- Loren G. Brow (1920–1996), nicknamed "Totch", author describing the Florida Everglades
- Scott Brow (born 1969), American baseball player

== See also ==
- Broward (disambiguation)
- Browder (disambiguation)
- Dubrow (disambiguation)
- Browde
- Browell
- Brower
