= List of geographical brows =

Brow is used in the name of several geographical features:

- Brow, Dumfries and Galloway, hamlet about 3 km from Ruthwell on the Solway Firth in Dumfries and Galloway, Scotland
- Brow Head (Irish: Ceann Bró) is the most southerly point of mainland Ireland
- Brow Point, the western entrance headland of Blue Whale Harbour on the north coast of South Georgia
- Brow Monument and Brow Monument Trail, Kaibab National Forest, in the National Register of Historic Places for Coconino County, Arizona
- Berry Brow, semi-rural village in West Yorkshire, England, situated about 3 km south of Huddersfield
- Cinnamon Brow, area on the east side of Warrington, England, between Orford and Birchwood
- Faulds Brow, small rise in the English Lake District, northwest of the village of Caldbeck in Cumbria
- Hill Brow, small village in the Chichester District of West Sussex, England
- Mere Brow, small village in Lancashire, England, situated between Tarleton and Banks
- Shaw's Brow, the original name of William Brown Street in Liverpool, England, a road remarkable for the number of public buildings
- Sunny Brow or Sunnybrow, village in County Durham, in England
- Swing Brow or Swingbrow, hamlet near to Chatteris, Cambridgeshire lying alongside the Forty Foot Drain built by Vermuyden

== See also ==
- Brow (disambiguation)
