= Ecology of Florida =

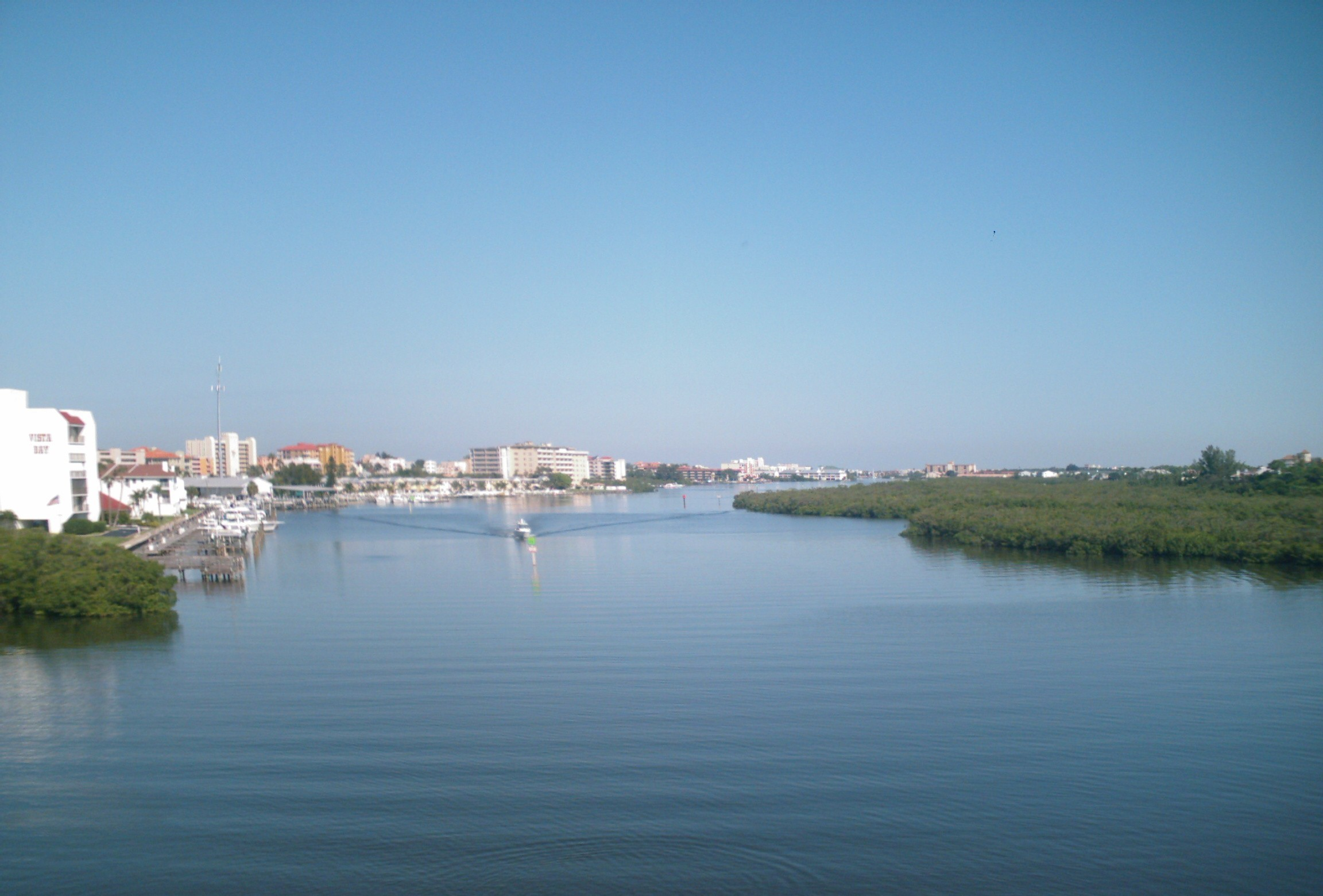
Looking north on State Road 694 from the bridge over Intracoastal Waterway. Indian Shores, Florida on left, mangroves on right

The ecology of Florida includes ecoregions with more than 80 distinct ecosystems. They differ in hydrology, climate, landforms, soil types, flora, and fauna, forming a global biodiversity hotspot.

== Abiotic environment ==
The climate of Florida varies across the state due to its polar orientation and 447-mile length. From central Florida to the Georgia border, the climate is generally humid subtropical, while South Florida has a tropical climate. The end of spring to mid-fall is characterized by a significant rainy season, with hurricanes, thunderstorms, and tropical cyclones. The winter and spring are significantly drier, often resulting in brushfires and strict no-fire laws. Snowfall has been recorded in northern Florida, and hard freezes have damaged orange groves.

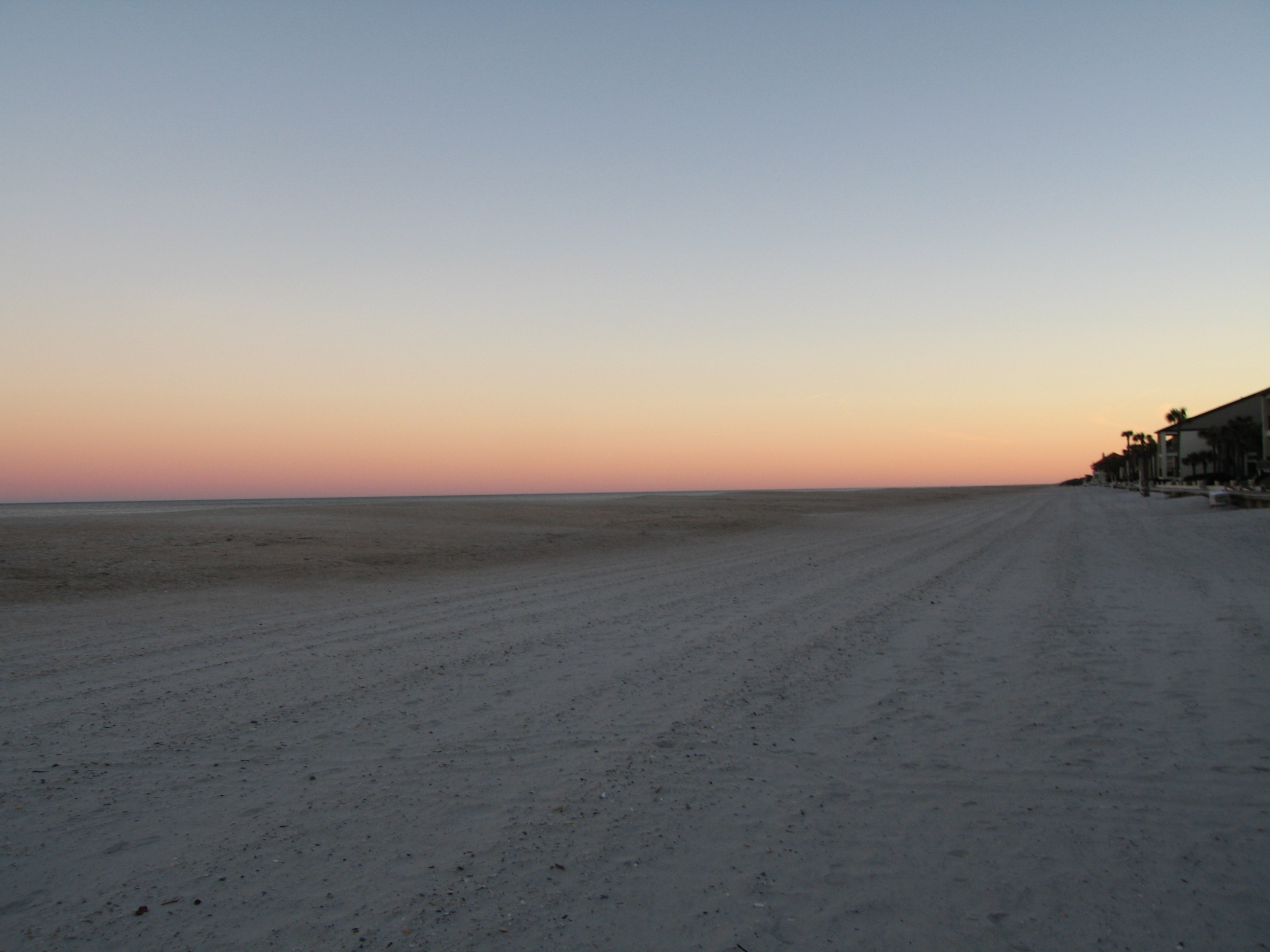
Ponte Vedra Beach, an area attracting many tourists

Florida is surrounded on three sides by bodies of water: the Gulf of Mexico to the west, Florida Bay to the south, and the Atlantic Ocean to the east. In addition to its coastal habitats, Florida has a variety of wetland habitats, such as marshland, swampland, lakes, springs, and rivers. Florida's largest river is the St. Johns River. Florida's largest lake, Lake Okeechobee, flows into the Florida Everglades, a two-million acre subtropical wetland.

== Biotic environment ==
=== Fauna ===
==== Terrestrial ====
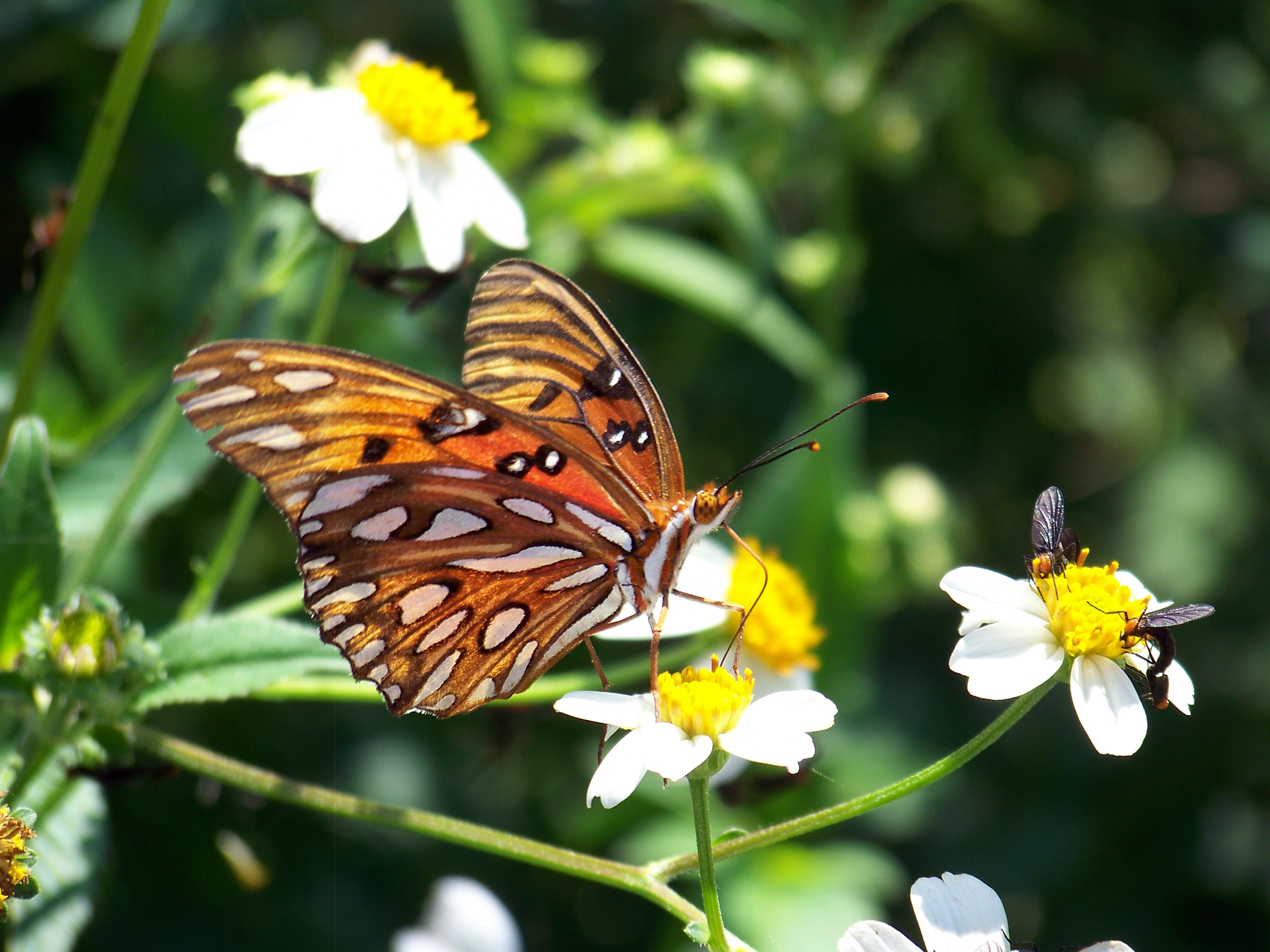
A Gulf fritillary, taken in Payne's Prairie State Park, Florida

Florida is home to diverse wildlife. Over 700 species of land animals are found in the state, including bobcats, armadillos, opossums, and foxes. More than 500 species of birds have been seen in the state, and it is home to an estimated 1,500 nesting pairs of bald eagles. Florida's diverse ecosystems are home to many types of insects, including the Gulf fritillary, a butterfly native to Florida grasslands.

Florida's mild climate, international ports of entry, and animal and nursery trades make the state vulnerable to invasive species; those that currently pose a threat include the Burmese python, cane toad, feral pigs, and lionfish. Native wildlife is also threatened by habitat loss through land being converted to agriculture and urban development.

==== Marine ====
Florida's waters support more than 200 freshwater fish species.

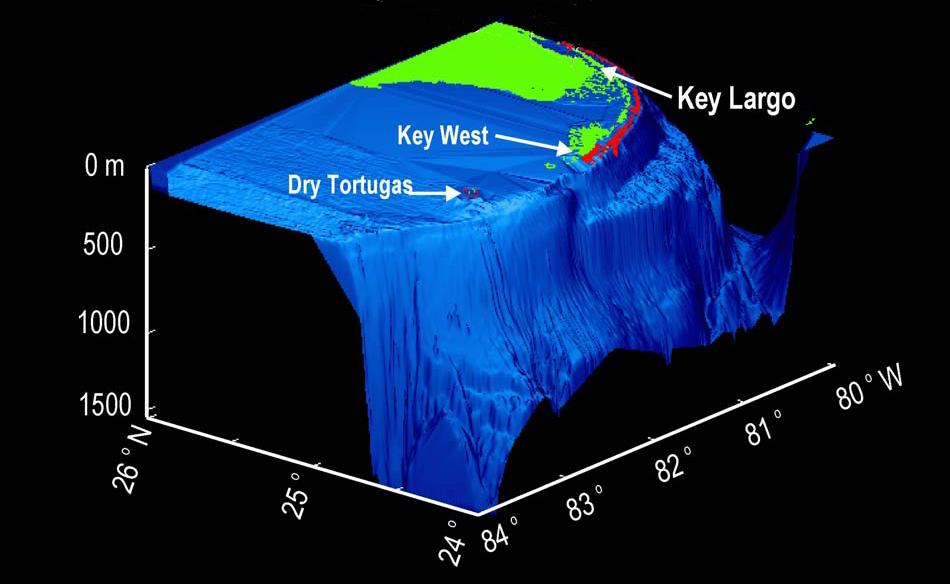
Three-dimensional map of southern Florida showing the Florida Reef in red.

The Florida Reef (also known as the Great Florida Reef, Florida reefs, Florida Reef Tract and Florida Keys Reef Tract) is the only living coral barrier reef in the continental United States. It lies a few miles seaward of the Florida Keys, is about 4 miles (6 to 7 km) wide and extends along the 20-metre (66 ft) depth contour 270 km (146 nmi; 168 mi) from Fowey Rocks just east of Soldier Key to just south of the Marquesas Keys. The system encompasses more than 6,000 individual reefs. Florida waters are home to over 500 marine fish and mammal species along with more than 45 species of stony corals and 35 species of octocorals.

=== Forest ecology ===
Florida has many types of forest ecosystems.

- Upland hardwoods: They are often found in patches, surrounded by flatwoods and sandhills. Upland hardwood forests typically host diverse trees and shrubs, with no dominant species. Many Florida state parks encompass upland hardwood forests.
- Bottomland hardwoods: They consist of shallow, wet areas near lakes, rivers, and sinkholes, which makes them prone to flooding. Consists of primarily deciduous trees that grow in layers with shrubs and herbaceous plants.
- Sandhills: This is a dry region with sandy soils that rarely floods. Fire periodically clears the underbrush and allows grasses and trees to dominate.
- Scrub: Scrub consists of various sand pines, dwarf oaks, Florida rosemary, palmettos, and other evergreen and xerophytic plants on sandy, nutrient-poor soil. This ecosystem is prone to and maintained by infrequent wildfires. Scrub plants tend to have extensive root systems close to the surface.
- Flatwoods: Pine flatwoods are low, flat, sandy lands subject to fires during dry months, but that may flood for months due to seasonal rainfall. Pine needles contribute to nutrient-rich soil, so plant growth is often rapid, supporting cattle grazing.
- Tropical hardwood hammock: This ecosystem includes many broad-leaved evergreens. These forests are restricted to South Florida because of hard freezes in the North. These areas are often preferred for development for their well-drained soils.

== Human impacts ==
In the pre-Columbian era, forests, prairies, and the Everglades dominated Florida's landscape. Small rivers, swamps, and natural lakes and springs were ubiquitous. At the time, the area was inhabited by the Florida's indigenous tribes. These tribes led a mostly subsistence-based lifestyle, consisting of basic farming to provide enough food for one family. This way of living had minimal effects on the landscape, as most of the time only fertile areas of non-swamp land were utilized.

Over time, as the European colonization of the Americas progressed, more and more Europeans began to colonize the area. Once the technology to drain and redirect extensive areas of swampland presented itself, more settlers came to lay claims to acres of land for future development. These large influxes of people led to the mass manipulation of the Florida landscape, altering it permanently. Significant effort was made to divert, drain, or redirect water through the creation of various types of waterways like canals or manmade lakes. Settlers also began cutting down forests, and converting the lands from natural to agricultural use. This intense and highly complex manipulation of the landscape caused problems for the native species of animals living there.

=== Water ===
Supplying water poses problems for the natural environment. Bodies of water, including lakes, ponds, and wetlands, are drained to create homes or other facilities. Water can also be redirected to address population growth or economic development, which may compete with the needs of flora and fauna. Runoff of pesticides and fertilizers from farming, industry, and households damages ecosystems. Toxic chemical runoff and byproducts from decomposing materials and foods can contaminate water supplies.

=== Deforestation ===
Forests offer habitats for small and large animals, insects, small organisms like bacteria and fungi that feed on decomposing tree trunks, and harbor plants. They also store carbon. Deforestation is the removal of trees to use the land for other purposes. "Florida has lost 22% of forests since 1953 (a loss of 1.6 million ha)."

=== Climate change ===
The effects of climate change in Florida are attributable to man-made increases in atmospheric carbon dioxide. Floridians are experiencing increased flooding due to sea level rise, and are concerned about the possibility of more frequent or more intense hurricanes.

The state has been described as America's "ground zero" for climate change, global warming and sea level rise, because "the majority of its population and economy is concentrated along low-elevation oceanfront."

Florida residents think climate change is happening at higher rates than the national average. As of March 2025, 88% of Floridians believe climate change is happening, with 55% believing it to be attributable to human activities. However, the state remains politically divided, with 74% of Democrats and 40% of Republicans agreeing with the scientific consensus that climate change is anthropogenic. Some communities in Florida have begun implementing climate change mitigation approaches; however, statewide initiatives have been hampered by the politicization of climate change in the United States, focusing on resilience rather than full scale mitigation and adaptation.

=== Introduced fauna and flora ===
Introduced species from non-native environments, such as Southeast Asia and South America thrived in Florida. Local and private groups formed to combat some invasive species. One example is Lygodium microphyllum. This vine can cover whole sections of a forest. The vine is native to Africa, Australia, and Southeast Asia

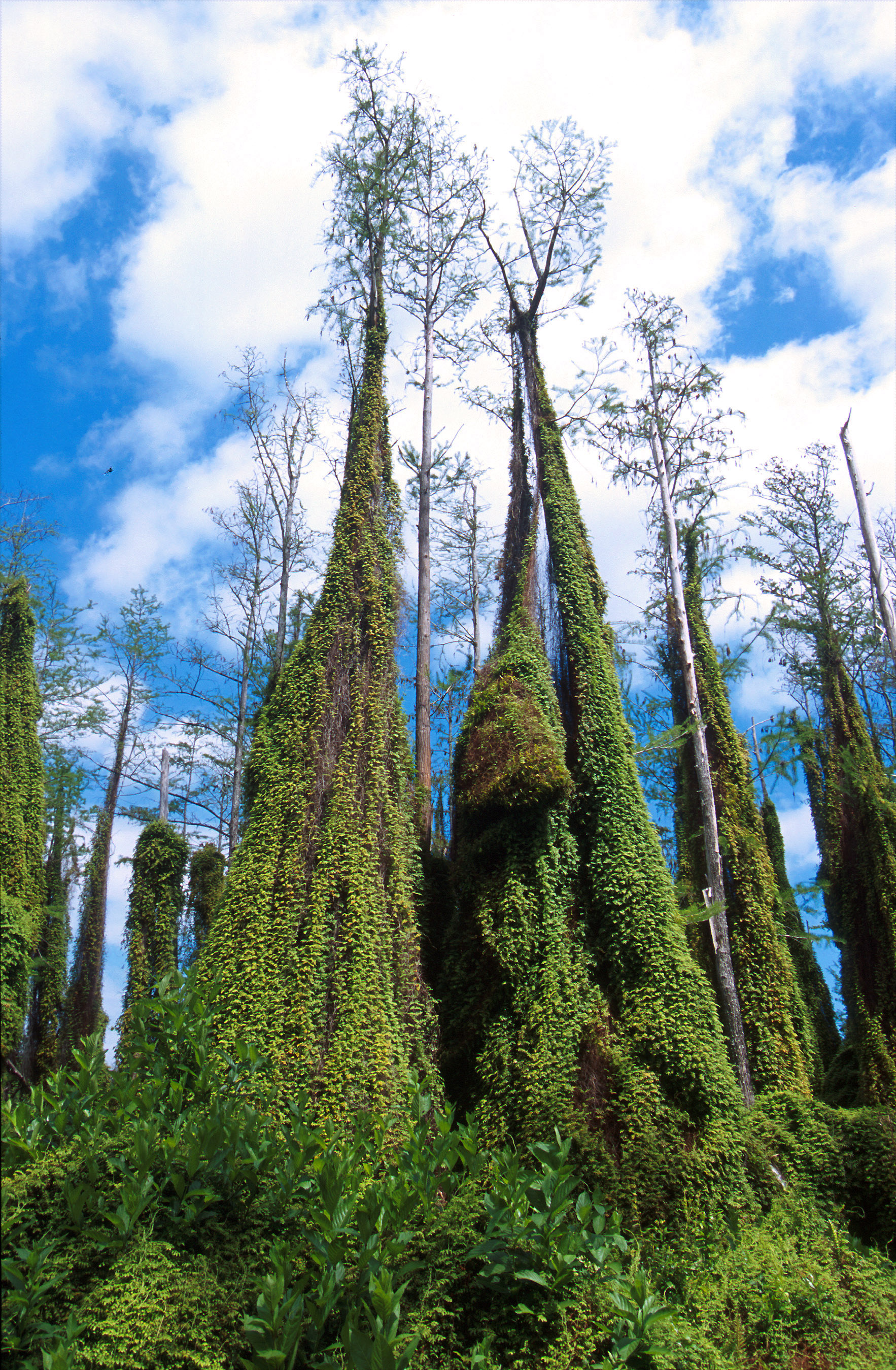
Old World fern taking over a forested area

One invasive animal species is the Cuban tree frog (Osteopilus septentrionalis). It hitched a ride in shipping containers. Only freezes and unusually cold winters limit their growth. They feed on native Florida tree frog populations." The frog is native to areas such as Cuba, Cayman Islands, and the Bahamas.

=== Endangered species ===
Florida has some 33 animals and 43 plant species rated endangered. They include the Florida panther, the leatherback sea turtle, the West Indian manatee, and the red-cockaded woodpecker. Endangered plants include the bell-flower, scrub plum, Small's milk pea, and the water-willow.

== Migration patterns ==
=== Panthers ===
The Florida panther is listed as endangered. The encroachment of highways and other man-made structures destroyed or diminished their natural habitats. They have trouble hunting the white-tailed deer, their main food, because of human disruptions. The panthers had to change their migration routes and acclimate to smaller hunting and breeding grounds.

=== Migratory birds ===
Many birds migrate between the US and South America or the Caribbean through Florida. Ospreys (Pandion haliaetus) that spend summers in the eastern half of the U.S. fly through Florida to reach the Yucatán peninsula, the Caribbean islands, and South America. Birds crossing the Gulf of Mexico stop in Florida to feed and rest. Species such as the Red Knot (Calidris canutus rufa), winter in Florida. The Red Knot stopover on the east coast enroute to the Caribbean. Migrating birds favor areas with dense hardwood forests. This habitat could indicate an abundance of resources. Protecting these forest habitats is necessary to protect these migrating birds. On Florida's East Coast, habitat loss caused by sea level rise, beach erosion, and development threaten migratory routes. The Migratory Bird Treaty Act made the "taking, killing, or possessing migratory birds unlawful".

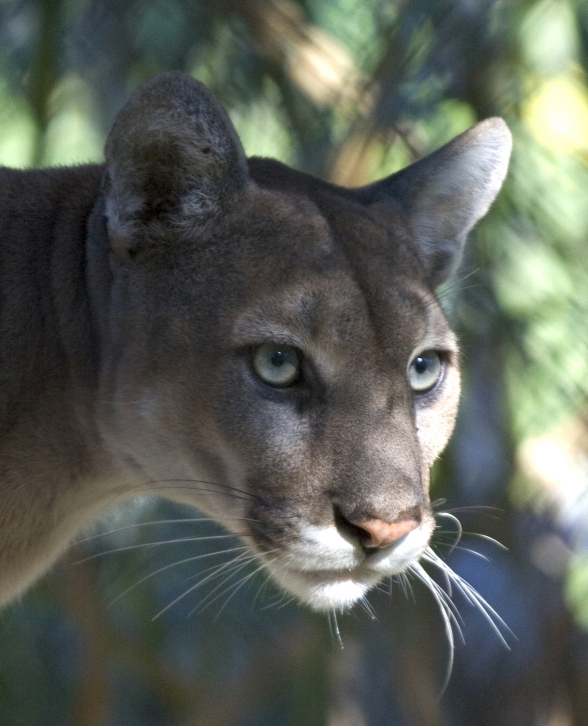
Image of a Florida panther

== State policies ==
The Florida Department of Environmental Protection is responsible for protecting Florida's ecology. Its mission is to protect "our air, water, and land." It operates 41 programs managed as Regulatory Programs, Land and Recreation, and Water Policy and Ecosystem Restoration.

=== Regulatory programs ===
The DEP makes regulations and ensures they are followed. Besides administrative sections, an office of the Inspector General conducts audits and investigations related to environmental protection. They are supported by law enforcement and policy compliance sectors. An office for siting coordination regulates the power grid and natural gas pipelines.

=== Land and recreation ===
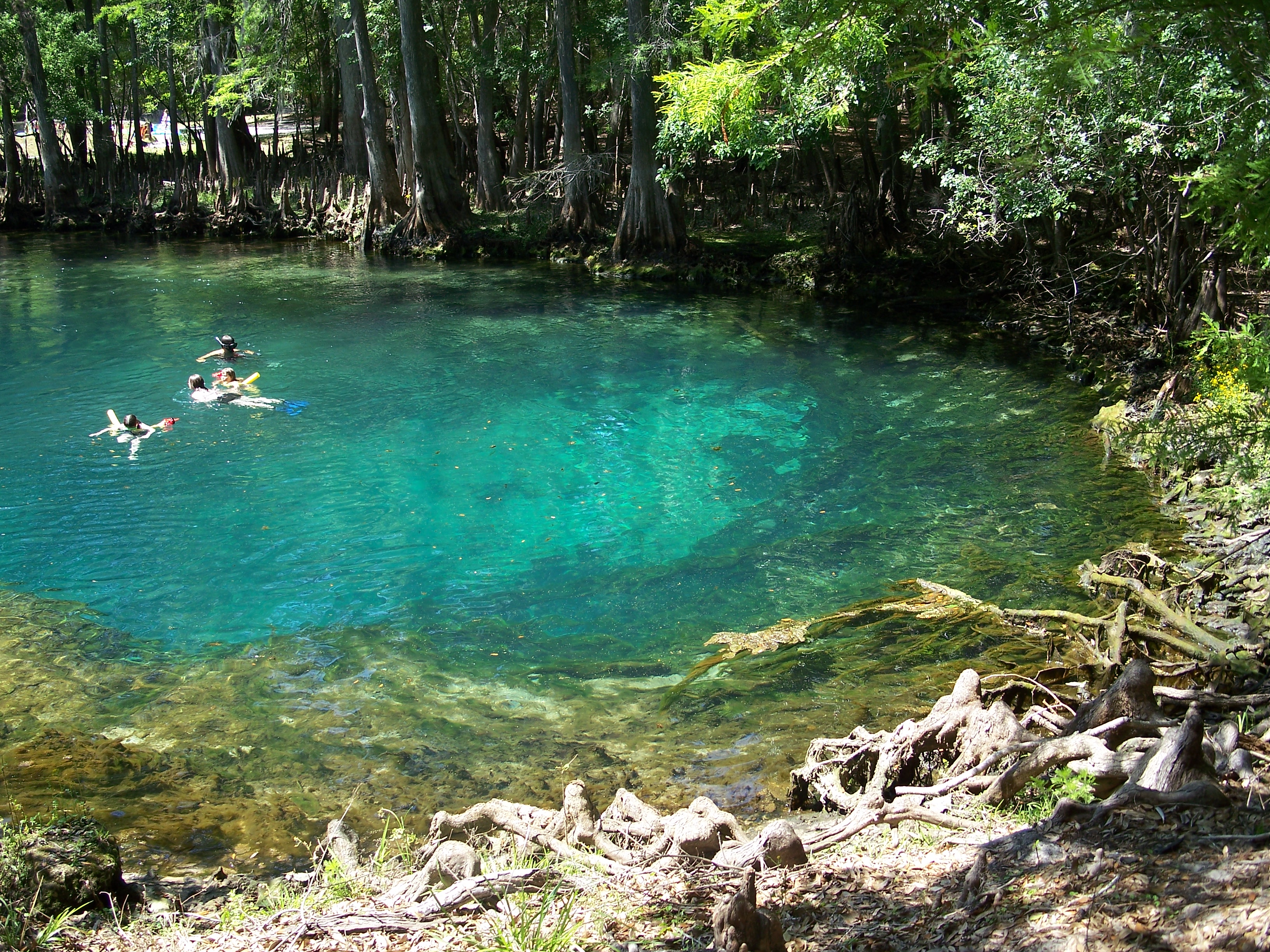
Manatee Springs State Park

The DEP is responsible for state-owned land, divided into the Florida State Parks program and the Public Lands program. This includes the state park system and most Florida's beaches. Separate entities deal with programs such as trails and greenways (Florida Ecological Greenways Network), Green Lodging, and the Clean Marina program. The Front Porch Florida program helps neighborhoods retain/regain a sense of community. The Bureau of Beaches and Coastal Systems monitors Florida's beach environments and works with local initiatives and the Army Corps of Engineers to protect and restore beaches. It also is responsible for disaster response initiatives, such as the Deepwater Horizon oil spill beach cleanup efforts.

=== Water policy and ecosystem restoration ===
Some programs from the other two categories also fall into this category, such as the Bureau of Beaches and Coastal Systems, because they deal with the restoration aspect of a larger issue. However, some programs are exclusively within this category, such as the Wastewater Program and the Everglades Restoration program. The Springs, Water, and Wetlands programs all fall into this category.

== Status ==
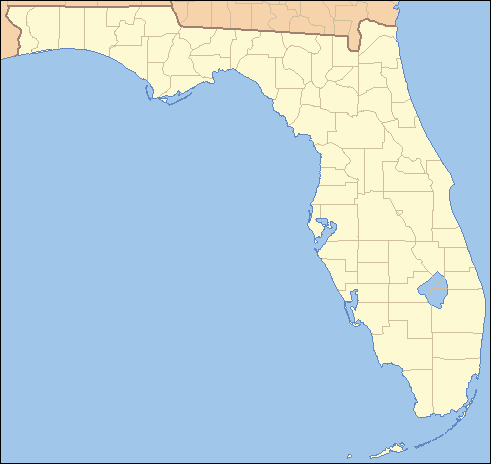
Florida Locator Map

=== Florida Ecological Restoration Inventory ===
In 1998, the Office of Ecosystem Management conducted the Florida Ecological Restoration Inventory (FERI). Using information gathered from the managers of state-owned lands, they assessed the restoration needs and created a comprehensive map including the urgency of each need. This became an online database of planned, needed, and completed restoration projects. In 2000, the Bureau of Submerged Lands and Environmental Resources (SLER) was awarded a grant to update FERI and expand the database to include information from other agencies. FERI included six categories: cultural resource protection, ecological protection, exotic removal, hydrologic restoration/enhancement, upland restoration/enhancement, and wetland restoration/enhancement. The inventory's run under SLER was funded from 2001 to 2003, rendering it currently inactive and outdated.

=== Recovery Program ===
The DEP has initiated the Recovery Program, which uses ARAA federal stimulus money to fund environmental programs across the state. Diesel emission reduction received 1.7 million dollars to provide electric power at rest stops so trucks do not have to idle and to retrofit school buses to make them more environmentally friendly. The state Superfund program received $61 million to clean up hazardous waste. Leaking Underground Storage Tanks got $11.2 million to clean up "orphan" petroleum storage tanks (abandoned tanks that have no party responsible for them). $750,000 went towards local brownfield land projects. The Clean Water State Revolving Fund used $132.3 million to issue loans for communities to improve their wastewater and stormwater systems. The Drinking Water State Revolving Fund got $88.1 million to issue community loans to upgrade drinking water infrastructure.
