= Boal (surname) =

Family name

The Boal surname is a variant of Bowell and Boyle. It is common in people of English, Welsh, and Irish descent. In Ireland it is a variant of Boyle while in northern Ireland it developed from the name Bowell.

Notable people with the surname include:

- Augusto Boal (1931–2009), Brazilian theater director
- Carmine Boal (born 1956), American politician
- Desmond Boal (1928–2015), Northern Ireland politician and barrister
- Don Boal (1907–1953), Canadian rower
- Iain Boal, Irish social historian
- James McClellan Boal, American politician
- Mark Boal (born 1973), American journalist, screenwriter and film producer
- Peter Boal (born 1965), American balletmaster and former New York City Ballet principal
- Robert Boal (1806–1903), American politician and physician
- Theodore Davis Boal (1867–1938), American army veteran (Colonel) and architect
- Walter Boal (born c. 1879), All-American football player and hammer thrower
- William Boal (died 1970), imprisoned for association with Mail Train robbery in 1963

== See also ==
- Boal, Spanish municipality in Asturias
- Boal (disambiguation)
