= Joe Browder =

American environmental activist (1938–2016)

- Born: April 10, 1938; Amarillo, Texas, US
- Died: September 18, 2016 (aged 78); Fairhaven, Maryland, US
- Occupations: Consultant, lobbyist, environmentalist
- Known for: Environmental activism, especially in the Everglades
- Spouse(s): Joan Arrington (divorced) Marion Edey (divorced) Louise Dunlap (m. 1976)
- Children: 2

Joe Bartles Browder (April 10, 1938, Amarillo – September 18, 2016, Fairhaven) was an American environmental lobbyist, activist, and consultant whose efforts were primarily focused on issues in South Florida, particularly in the Everglades. He was an advisor on energy, climate change, and environmental policy to public-interest groups, foundations, auto and energy companies, Native American tribes and government agencies. He worked with many environmentalists throughout his career, most notably Marjory Stoneman Douglas and Nathaniel Reed. He is credited with being instrumental to the founding of the Biscayne National Park (1968) and the Big Cypress National Preserve (1974), and for stopping the construction of the Big Cypress Jetport and an oil port and refinery in Biscayne Bay. He began working as a lobbyist in Washington, D.C. in 1970 and later worked as environmental policy coordinator during the Carter administration.

== Biography ==
=== Early life and career ===
Browder was born in Amarillo, Texas on April 10, 1938 to Betty Bartles of Dewey, Oklahoma and Edward Browder Jr., an aviator and the son of a Santa Fe railroad executive. Edward served in the Royal Canadian Air Force before Pearl Harbor, then in the United States Army Air Forces. Joe had at least one brother, Bill, who also became an aviator. The Browders moved frequently; by age 14, Joe Browder had lived in Canada, Cuba, Mexico, Miami, Arizona, and Colorado before the family returned to Amarillo. His mother had remarried by the mid-1950s.

Following his service in World War II, Edward Browder became a white collar criminal; in his 2006 book The Swamp, Michael Grunwald refers to him as a "CIA operative and freelance gun-runner." He was arrested in 1947 and twice in 1948 for trafficking arms to insurgents from Venezuela. He served 18 months in prison for supplying navy bombers to Nicaraguans intending to bomb Caracas. By the mid-1950s, he had turned to financial fraud and was arrested in 1959 for transporting stolen Canadian bonds and again in 1960 for selling stolen securities, the latter of which he claimed to have received as payment for supplying Fidel Castro's rebels with guns and ammunition leading up to the 1952 Cuban coup d'état. He was eventually sentenced to 25 years at McNeil Island for securities fraud around 1969. Browder's name appears in several CIA documents, particularly in reports requested by G. Robert Blakey, though his role in the agency is not disclosed.

Joe Browder attended Cornell University to study ornithology for one semester before dropping out to get married. He was briefly a policeman, then began working in radio news before moving from Amarillo to Miami in the early 1960s. By 1961, he had joined WCKT-TV, where he worked as a reporter until 1968.

=== Environmentalism ===
Browder left WCKT-TV after attending the national Audubon convention as a delegate for his local chapter. There, he was convinced to dedicate himself fully to environmental advocacy. During his decades-long career in environmental activism, he worked with major figures such as Marjory Stoneman Douglas, Charles Lee, Arthur R. Marshall, Dante Fascell, and Nathaniel Reed. One of Browder's first major victories culminated in President Lyndon B. Johnson designating Biscayne Bay a national monument in October 1968, protecting it from being developed into an oil port and refinery. The directive also stopped the diversion of water from the Everglades. Douglas described Browder as the "hardest working" activist in the crusade against the refinery.

While defending Biscayne Bay, Browder and his associates also worked on protesting the construction of the Dade-Collier Training and Transition Airport, a jetport in the Big Cypress area of the Everglades. It was planned to be five times larger than JFK International Airport in New York City and developers intended to build up the surrounding area. In 1970, Life stated that Browder and attorney Dan Paul were at the forefront of the conservation efforts. Browder penned a congressional bill to make Big Cypress a national preserve; this was co-sponsored by Lawton Chiles in the Senate and Dante Fascell in the House. He also convinced Douglas to join the fight for the Everglades in a "public and political" capacity in 1969, before which she had not considered herself an environmental activist. He suggested she start Friends of the Everglades and served as the group's co-founder. Browder also met with Buffalo Tiger of the Miccosukee Nation, who lived on the land, to ensure their voices were heard. Miami Mayor Chuck Hall referred to Browder and Nathaniel Reed as "white militants", but later capitulated and placed Browder on a citizens' committee dedicated to the jetport issue. In 1970, Browder was interviewed by Frank Borman for the ABC special Mission Possible--They Care for the Land, a three-part series on ecology. Browder testified at congressional hearings and met with the Nixon administration, who he managed to convince the development would be a "loss for the nation." Nixon agreed to withdraw federal funding from the jetport, leaving just one of the six planned runways finished. Browder then drafted the bill that led to the establishment of the Big Cypress National Preserve in 1974.

In May 1970, Browder moved to Washington, D.C. to work as a lobbyist and conservation director for Friends of the Earth. He helped found the lobbying and consultant group Environmental Policy Center, where he served as executive director. Around this time, he fought against the German multinational BASF, who were looking to build a massive chemical plant in a "pollution-free estuary" near Hilton Head Island, South Carolina. The $200-million plans were eventually abandoned. Eliot Cutler described Browder as "one of the five best environmental lobbiests [sic] I ran into on the hill... He is terribly effective in terms of getting to people with the kind of information they need when they need it." In the early 1970s, he helped organize members of the League of Conservation Voters to support the political campaigns of candidates whose election would be beneficial to the environment. One of these candidates was John Blatnik, who unseated longtime House Public Works Committee chairman George Hyde Fallon. In 1971, Browder also helped convince Nixon to stop construction on the Cross Florida Barge Canal.

In 1976, Browder was appointed to the environmental task force on Jimmy Carter's transition team under Jack Watson. However, Browder left in mid-November after the election due to policy disagreements among the team. He returned to Carter's staff in 1977 as a special assistant to the Assistant Secretary in the Department of the Interior. He then worked as policy coordinator until 1980. In 1981, he and his wife Louise Dunlap started the environmental consulting firm Dunlap & Browder.

In 1998, he helped Maryland governor Parris Glendening negotiate the purchase of 477 acres of land on the peninsula in Shady Side to protect it from developers intent on building housing on the land. In 2015, he helped establish the Franklin Point State Park there, protecting it even further. In his later years, he advocated for the Everglades Headwaters National Wildlife Refuge and Conservation Area and lobbied for protections against pollution from Florida's sugar industry. He strongly criticized the Clinton administration for its perceived willingness to sacrifice the Everglades in favor of multinationals. When the Miami Homestead General Aviation Airport, an airport in the midst of the Everglades and Biscayne National Park, was announced, Browder accused the administration of "selling out the parks" and blamed the influence of billionaire Paul Tudor Jones, a family friend of Al Gore who routinely gave Audubon nearly $1 million each year. During the 2000 presidential election cycle, Browder gave information to Ralph Nader about the Homestead airport with the intention of undermining Gore, who refused to waver in his support of the airport despite the Sierra Club reporting to his campaign that it was costing him votes.

Journalist Michael Grunwald described Browder as Audubon's "abrasive but effective southeastern representative" who possessed "ferocious intensity." While well-respected, Browder's criticism of other environmentalists in particular meant that "most of the established conservation groups hardly welcomed him." David Houghton, president of the National Wildlife Refuge Association at the time of Browder's death in 2016, wrote that the “Big Cypress National Preserve, Everglades National Park and Everglades Headwaters National Wildlife Refuge and Conservation Area are testament to his profound passion and dedication.” The National Park Service recognized him as the "Citizen Father of the Big Cypress Preserve" and he is widely seen as being responsible in founding the Biscayne National Park (1968) and the Big Cypress National Preserve (1974). Browder was also a contributor to BusinessWeek, The Miami Herald, and El Nuevo Herald.

Browder served as the National Audubon Society southeastern US representative from 1968 to 1970. He was founder and coordinator of the Everglades Coalition and served as its national chair in 1994 and 1995. He was a board member for the René Dubos Center for Human Environments and the Friends of the Everglades, and a Host Committee member at the 1999 Inter-American Dialogue in Panama. He co-chaired a discussion during the concurrent Annual Conference on Water Management and Annual Meeting of the Interstate Council on Water Policy with Mato Grosso do Sul Environment Secretary Emiko Kawakmi de Resende in October 1993. He also sat on the advisory board of the InterAmerican Water Resources Network and later taught a graduate course on "private enterprise and the environment" at Johns Hopkins University.

== Personal life ==
Browder dropped out of Cornell University to return to Amarillo and marry his high school sweetheart, environmental scientist Joan Arrington. They had two sons, Ronald and Monte, and divorced after 13 years. Browder then married environmental activist Marion Edey; this marriage also ended in divorce. In 1976, he married Louise Dunlap, who he met at a Senate hearing for the jetport. He died of liver cancer on September 18, 2016 at his home in Fairhaven, Maryland.

Browder had diabetes. His papers were donated to the University of Florida libraries in 2021.
