= Alexander Craighead =

- Born: March 18, 1705; Donegal, Ulster, Ireland
- Died: 1766 (aged 60–61); Charlotte, North Carolina, USA
- Resting place: Sugaw Creek Presbyterian Church cemetery
- Occupation: Preacher
- Title: Reverend
- Parent: Thomas Craighead

Alexander Craighead (1705–1766) was a Scots-Irish American preacher.

== Biography ==
=== Early life ===
Alexander Craighead was born in Donegal, Ulster, Ireland on March 18, 1707. He emigrated to North America with his father, the Reverend Thomas Craighead.

He died March 1766 in Rocky Creek, Mecklenburg County, North Carolina. He was the youngest son of Rev. Thomas Craighead and Margaret Holmes. He was the brother to John Craighead. Their mother was Margaret Holmes who was born in Scotland. She came with her husband and four of their five children from County Londonderry to America settling first in Massachusetts. Her brother, William Holmes' son Robert Holmes married Mary Franklin whose brother was Benjamin Franklin, Patriot, Statesmen, Scientist, and Signer of the American Declaration of Independence. [Source, "Craighead Family", by Rev. James Geddes Craighead]. Also, "Simpson and Allied Families", by Dennis William Simpson 1985.

=== Career ===
He preached at the Middle Octorara Church, along the Susquehanna River in Pennsylvania, during the 1730s, but continued to move south and west to the frontiers of colonial civilization. After a stay in Augusta County, Virginia, at Windy Cove, he moved to Mecklenburg County, North Carolina.

"Another group of pioneers (Ulster Scots) settled nearer the present site of Charlotte and organized the Sugaw Creek Presbyterian Church in 1755, with Rev. Craighead serving as pastor of both the Rocky River church and the Sugaw Creek Presbyterian Church from the time each was organized until [his death in] 1766. Details of his long, eventful, and sometimes turbulent life are recorded in numerous places, notably The Presbyterian Church at Rocky River, by Thomas Hugh Spence Jr. (1954) and A History of Sugaw Creek Presbyterian Church, by Neill Roderick McCeachy (1954)."

A prolific writer and leader in his faith, he published numerous works, including Renewal of the Covenants, National and Solemn League; A Confession of Sins; An Engagement to Duties; and a Testimony; as they were Carried on at Middle Octorara in Pennsylvania, November 11, and The reasons of Mr. Alexander Craighead's receding from the present judicatories of this church..., 1743, both published by Benjamin Franklin.

Considered a promoter of the "Revival" and a participant in the "Great Awakening", he was a vocal critic of King George III and the Church of England. He often preached to his flock to resist threats to their independence, and he held the rights of the common man as sacred as that of kings. He is counted as the spiritual father of the Mecklenburg Declaration of Independence, which was allegedly written nine years after his death.

=== Death ===
He died in 1766, and was buried in the oldest burial ground of Sugaw Creek Presbyterian Church, on Craighead Road off North Tryon Street in Charlotte, North Carolina.
