= Tornquist Bay =

Tornquist Bay (54°4′S 36°59′W) is a small bay between Cape Constance and Antarctic Point along the north coast of South Georgia. Charted in 1929-30 by DI personnel, who called it Windy Cove, because of strong gusts of wind experienced there, but the name Windy Hole was subsequently used on charts for the bay. Following a survey of South Georgia in 1951–52, the SGS reported that this feature is known to the whalers and sealers as Tornquist Bay, because the wreck of the Ernesto Tornquist, which ran aground on October 16, 1950, lies near its west shore. This latter name is approved on the basis of local usage; the name Windy Hole is never used locally. The name Windy Cove, originally applied to this bay, has been transferred in local usage to the bay immediately southeast of Antarctic Point and it has since become established there.
