= Browder =

Browder may refer to:

== People ==
- Alexander Browder (born 2009), British financial crime researcher
- Andrew Browder (1931–2019), American mathematician
- Aurelia Browder (1919–1971), African-American civil rights activist
- Ben Browder (born 1962), American actor and writer
- Bill Browder (born 1964), Hermitage Capital Management CEO and Vladimir Putin critic
- Dustin Browder, American executive at Blizzard Entertainment
- Earl Browder (1891–1973), Chairman of the Communist Party, USA from 1934 to 1945
- Felix Browder (1927–2016), United States mathematician
- Glen Browder (born 1943), Alabama politician
- Joe Browder (1938–2016), American environmental activist
- Joshua Browder (born 1997), British-American founder of DoNotPay
- Kalief Browder (1993–2015), African-American jailed for three years as a teen for robbery before his case was dismissed
- Nick Browder (born 1975), former US Arena football quarterback
- William Browder (mathematician) (1934–2025), American topology mathematician

== Other ==
- Browder, Kentucky, an unincorporated community in Muhlenberg County
