= Nathaniel Reed (environmentalist) =

American environmentalist (1933–2018)

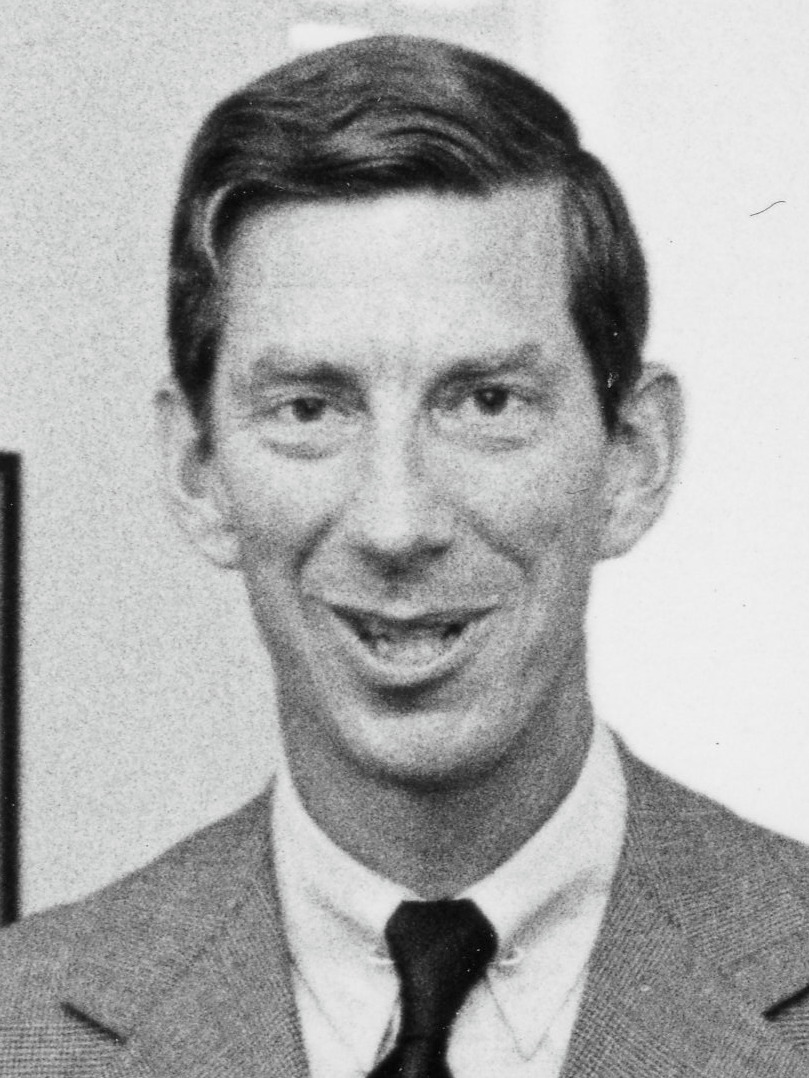
- Reed in 1973
- Born: Nathaniel Pryor Reed; July 22, 1933; New York City, US
- Died: July 11, 2018 (aged 84); Quebec City, Canada
- Other name: Nat Reed
- Education: Trinity College; Deerfield Academy
- Occupations: Assistant Secretary of Fish, Wildlife and Parks
- Employer: United States Department of Interior
- Known for: ending the use of DDT and Compound 1080, co-wrote the Endangered Species Act of 1973
- Board member of: Audubon Everglades Foundation; National Geographic Society; Natural Resources Defense Council; The Nature Conservancy Yellowstone National Park

Nathaniel Pryor "Nat" Reed (July 22, 1933 – July 11, 2018) was an American environmentalist and political aide. He was Assistant Secretary of Fish, Wildlife and Parks at the United States Department of the Interior who co-wrote the Endangered Species Act of 1973 and is credited with stopping the use of DDT. He also helped with the passage of the Clean Water Act, the Marine Mammal Protection Act, and the expansion of national parks and reserves.

President and CEO of Audubon, David Yarnold said, "Nat was a giant in conservation—that phrase is used a lot, but in Nat's case it's true."

== Early life ==
Reed was born in New York City. He was the son of Permelia Pryor and Joseph Verner Reed of Greenwich, Connecticut and Hobe Sound, Florida. His father was a financier, author, diplomat, and producer of the American Shakespeare Festival in Greenwich. His maternal grandfather, Samuel F. Pryor, was a St. Louis, Missouri banker before moving east during World War I to manage the Remington Arms Co. His paternal grandfather, Verner Z. Reed, became wealthy through his banking, mining, oil, and ranch interests. After brokering the sale of a gold mine for a fee of $2 million, Verner Reed moved his family to Europe where Joseph was raised.

Reed was raised on a 125-acre estate in Greenwich, Connecticut and in Hobe Sound, Florida. His family also spent each August in the Adirondack Mountains. He grew up in nature, fishing and boating from the age of six.

He attended Deerfield Academy in Massachusetts. He also attended Trinity College in Connecticut, graduating with a B.A. in 1955. There, he was a member of the fraternity St. Anthony Hall. After college, he was a lieutenant in the U.S. Air Force for four years, serving in intelligence services in Europe, the Middle East, and north Africa through 1959.

== Career ==
In 1960, Reed moved to Florida and began working as the vice president, and then president, of his family's business, the Hobe Sound Corp, until 1971. Hobe Sound Corp. was a land holding company that owned clubs and hotels between Fort Pierce, Florida and West Palm Beach, Florida, including owning the private Jupiter Island and its Jupiter Island Club. In 1968, Reed and his family donated five miles of beachfront to create Hobe Sound National Wildlife Refuge. One newspaper noted, "The area will thus be a haven for sea turtles and birds as well as for and millionaires." Regardless, Reed was horrified by the population explosion and uncontrolled development that was taking place in Florida during his childhood; he joined The Nature Conservancy. He was also motivated to become an environmentalist by Rachel Carson's Silent Spring which was released in 1962.

In 1962, Democratic Governor Farris Bryant appointed Reed to serve as the co-chair of the Florida Board of Antiquities. Reed saved thousands of gold coins and antiquities found in the state for Florida. When Republican Claude R. Kirk Jr. ran for governor of Florida, Reed prepared his conservation platform. Reed's qualifications seemed to have been that he was an amateur biologist, amateur botanist, and amateur ichthyologist, as well as a fisherman and hunter. He also had a passion “to unite fellow Floridians in my quest to stop unwanted development and mitigate ecological losses.”

On January 6, 1967, Reed was appointed to the staff of Governor Kirk as an Environmental Counsel or administrative assistant for matters relating to industrial development and conservation. His salary was $1 a year. He worked to protect Everglades National Park and to safeguard public lands. He endorsed the creation of Biscayne National Park and 22 new state parks. He also established effective controls to limit water and air pollution through the Florida Air and Water Pollution Control Act.

After Kirk left office, Reed was asked to continue as a consultant to Governor Reuben Askew and the chair of Florida's Air and Water Pollution Control Board. In 1968, Reed became chair of the Florida Pollution Control Commission. He then became the first chairman of the Florida Department of Air and Water Pollution Control in 1969. In this capacity, he sued Mobil when their phosphate mining subsidiary polluted a stream. Under his leadership, Florida's department became "one of the most aggressive and creative in the United States." When describing Reed's service to Florida, Democratic Representative Paul G. Rogers (Florida) said, "What impressed me about Nat Reed was the fact that he didn't care who it was that was polluting—and I think this is very significant—if they were polluting, he took action against them."

In 1971, became the Assistant Secretary of Fish, Wildlife and Parks at the United States Department of the Interior. In 1967, the newspapers had described Reed as a wealthy Republican. In 1971 when he was 37 years old, he was described as a multi-millionaire. During his confirmation hearings with the U.S. Senate, it was revealed that Reed owned $500,000 in Mobil Oil company stock; however, this was not enough of a conflict to stop his appointment. Reed's family had accepted the oil stock in exchange for oil shale land in Colorado. Although not required, Reed immediately sold $200,000 of the stock and committed to sell another $200,000 by January 1972. The remaining $100,000 was to be given to his children.

When he accepted the federal appointment which paid $38,000 a year, Reed expected to be in Washington D.C. for two years. He stayed in this position until 1977, serving under Presidents Richard Nixon and Gerald Ford. One of his duties was to review the Department of Interior's environmental impact statements with regards to compliance with the National Environmental Policy Act of 1969. On November 24, 1971, Nixon appointed Reed to serve as a commissioner of the U.S. Great Lakes Fishery Commission.

A challenge faced by Reed when joining the Nixon administration was the general tendency of other Republications to be against environmental regulations; Reed said, "I am totally convinced that there must be environmental Republicans and that our record is far better than our critics would have it." However, Reed did find his work to be underfunded and involving too many "over-political aids." Despite political roadblocks, Reed included and promoted significant legislation, including passage of the Marine Mammal Protection Act and the Clean Water Act. He stopped the Everglades Jetport and the Cross Florida Barge Canal, ended the use of DDT and Compound 1080, and co-wrote the Endangered Species Act of 1973. He expanded Redwoods National Park, protected eighty million acres in Alaska, and helped create Big Cypress National Reserve. He also pushed to stop feeding the Yellowstone grizzly bears garbage, returning them to a natural lifestyle, and his efforts to end the poisoning of western wolves with Compound 1080 helped restore both wolf and wolverine populations. Passed over for promotions and disliking the newly appointed Secretary of the Interior, Reed left office in November 1976 when Ford was not reelected.

Back in Florida, Reed was elected to the Jupiter Island City Commission in March 1977. Also in 1977, he contemplated running for governor of Florida, with Dr. Charles Perry Kirk, as a running mate. In 1978, Governor Bob Graham appointed Mr. Reed to the board of the South Florida Water Management District. He served on this board for fourteen years and oversaw replacing its development-minded members with those who supported the restoration of the Everglades.

In 1981, Reed publicly denounced James G. Watt, Secretary of the Interior and former underling to Reed. Although a supporter of President Ronald Reagan, Reed noted that, "They are attempting to turn the clock back to the pre- [Theodore] Roosevelt era, when everyone supposed natural resources were inexhaustible." He spoke out because, "I cannot sit idly by and watch lame-brained, outmoded philosophy take hold in stain my party's image." According to Reed, Watts had cut funding for endangered species, wanted to reduce grants to states through the Land and Water Conservation Fund by as much as 75%, and had promised to give concessionaires a larger role in the administration of national parks. Reed also objected to Watts' belief in a Christian mandate "to occupy the land" and his description of the Grand Canyon river run as "boring.

In 1993, Reed co-chaired the new Florida Greenways Commission. In 2006, he co-chaired the Urban Land Institute's Florida Committee for Regional Cooperation. He also served on Florida's Environmental Land Management Study Committee II, Reclaimed Lands Committee, and Constitutional Revision Commission. In addition, he served on the Treasure Coast Regional Planning Council and chaired the Coastal Zone Committee.

In 2017, Reed wrote a memoir, Travels on the Green Highway, that covered his decades of environmental campaigns.

== Awards and honors ==
- 1972: Honorary Doctor of Public Service, University of Florida
- 1972: Cornelius Amory Pugsley National Medal Award, 1000 Friends of Florida
- 2003: Bill Sadowski Memorial Outstanding Service Award, Environmental and Land Use Law Section of The Florida Bar
- 2004: Elizabeth Craig Weaver Proctor Medal, Garden Club of America.
- 2005: Distinguished Friend, Florida Defenders of the Environment
- 2006: Community Foundation for Palm Beach and Martin Counties Award
- 2007: Aldo Starker Leopold Wild Trout Medal—Professional, Wild Trout Symposium
- 2007: Distinguished Leader in Fish and Wildlife Conservation Award, University of Florida
- 2008: Atlantic Salmon Federation Hall of Fame
- 2013, Spirit of Defenders Advocacy Award, Defenders of Wildlife
- 2014, Champion of the Everglades Award, Arthur R. Marshall Foundation
- 2017, Dan F. Lufkin Prize for Environmental Leadership, Audubon
- Everglades Coalition Hall of Fame

== Personal life ==
Reed had three brothers—they were a vice president of Chase Manhattan Bank, the owner of American Heritage magazine, and a cattle farmer in Maryland.

On January 9, 1965, Reed married Alita Davis Weaver Pryor on January 9, 1965, at Christ Church in Greenwich, Connecticut. She was from St. Louis and Greenwich and was the daughter of Mr. and Mrs. William B. Weaver Jr. of Quaker Ridge in Greenwich. They had three children: Adrien, Alita, and Nathaniel Jr. The family lived on Jupiter Island, Florida.

Reed was associated with many nonprofit organizations, including being chair of the Natural Resources Defense Council, vice-chair of The Nature Conservancy, vice-chair of Audubon, chair of the Crystal River Manatee Sanctuary Committee, and served on the board of the American Rivers, Atlantic Salmon Federation, the Florida Audubon Society, Hope Rural High School, the National Geographic Society, and Yellowstone National Park. He was also a founder, president, and chairman of 1000 Friends of Florida, a nonprofit that watched growth. He also helped create and was CEO of the Everglades Foundation.

In 2018, Reed died in Quebec City, Canada at the age of 84 from a brain injury he received while fishing for salmon on the Grand Cascapédia River.
