= Blue whale (disambiguation) =

The blue whale is the largest species of whale, and the largest species of all animal species.

Blue whale may also refer to:

- Blue Whale Harbour, an anchorage on South Georgia Island
- Blue Whale Mountain, a mountain on South Georgia Island
- Blue Whale Systems, a British mobile phone services software company
- Blue Whale of Catoosa a waterfront structure, just east of Catoosa, Oklahoma
- Blue Whale Jazz Club, a jazz club in Los Angeles
- Blue Whale Challenge, an online game that reportedly features suicide as the end goal
- Blue Whale 1, a rocket developed by Perigee Aerospace
- A short-lived band featuring drummer Aynsley Dunbar
- Nickname of Center Blue, a large building within the Pacific Design Center
- BlueWhale, a German-Israeli unmanned underwater drone (UUV) from ELTA Systems Ltd. and Atlas Elektronik
