= Southern coastal plain oak dome and hammock =

Ecological zone of southeastern US

The Southern coastal plain oak dome and hammock is a hammock forest type occurring in small patches in Florida, Georgia, Alabama, and Mississippi. These forests consist of thick stands of evergreen oaks on shallow depressions or slight hills. They are distinct from their surrounding habitats, which are often woodlands dominated by longleaf pine.

== Mesic hammocks ==
Mesic hammocks, also known as oak hammock, or cabbage palm hammock, grow on moist soils that are rarely flooded. There is typically a dense layer of leaf litter, and the sandy soils are relatively rich. Mesic hammocks in the central part of the Florida peninsula have a lower diversity of tree species than do those to the north and south, as the ranges of most deciduous hardwoods found in northern Florida do not extend south of about Orlando, and the ranges of the tropical hardwoods found in southern Florida do not extend as far north as Lake Okeechobee. Common species are southern live oak (Quercus virginiana), Pignut Hickory (Carya glabra), American sweetgum (Liquidambar styraciflua), sand laurel oak (Quercus hemisphaerica), and American persimmon (Diospyros virginiana). The understory is sparse, with trumpet creeper (Campsis radicans) and greenbrier (Smilax spp).

=== Cabbage palm-live oak hammocks ===
Cabbage palm-live oak hammocks, also known as prairie hammocks, are a sub-type of mesic hammocks composed principally of live oak and cabbage palm trees. They also occur in central and southern Florida in prairies and floodplains, on river levees, and on slopes between dry uplands and wetlands, and are the transition between subtropical and tropical forests releves.

== Xeric hammocks ==
Xeric hammocks, also known as xeric forests, sand hammocks, live oak forests, oak woodlands, or oak hammocks, grow on old sand dunes that are very well drained. The most common canopy tree in xeric hammocks is the sand live oak, (Quercus geminata). Other species of scrub oak and pine are also found in xeric hammocks. Plants that are typical of scrub or sandhill communities, particularly palmetto, are found under the canopy. Xeric hammocks are somewhat resistant to fire, but a fire that becomes established in a hammock will destroy it.

== Related communities ==
The southern coastal plain upland hardwood forest has more diverse upland hardwood trees and tends to be found farther north.
