= Maryland Route 423 =

State highway in Maryland, United States

Maryland Route 423
- Fairhaven Road
- Maryland Route 423 highlighted in red

Route information
- Maintained by MDSHA
- Length: 2.79 mi (4.49 km)
- Existed: 1930–present
- Tourist routes: Roots and Tides Scenic Byway

Major junctions
- West end: MD 2 near Friendship
- East end: Arundel Road at Fairhaven

Location
- Country: United States
- State: Maryland
- Counties: Anne Arundel

Highway system
- Maryland highway system; Interstate; US; State; Scenic Byways
| ← MD 422 | → MD 424 |

Maryland Route 423 (MD 423) is a state highway in the U.S. state of Maryland. Known as Fairhaven Road, the highway runs 2.79 miles (4.49 km) from MD 2 near Friendship east to Arundel Road at Fairhaven in southern Anne Arundel County. MD 423 was constructed in the early 1930s and extended at its western end in the late 1950s.

== Route description ==
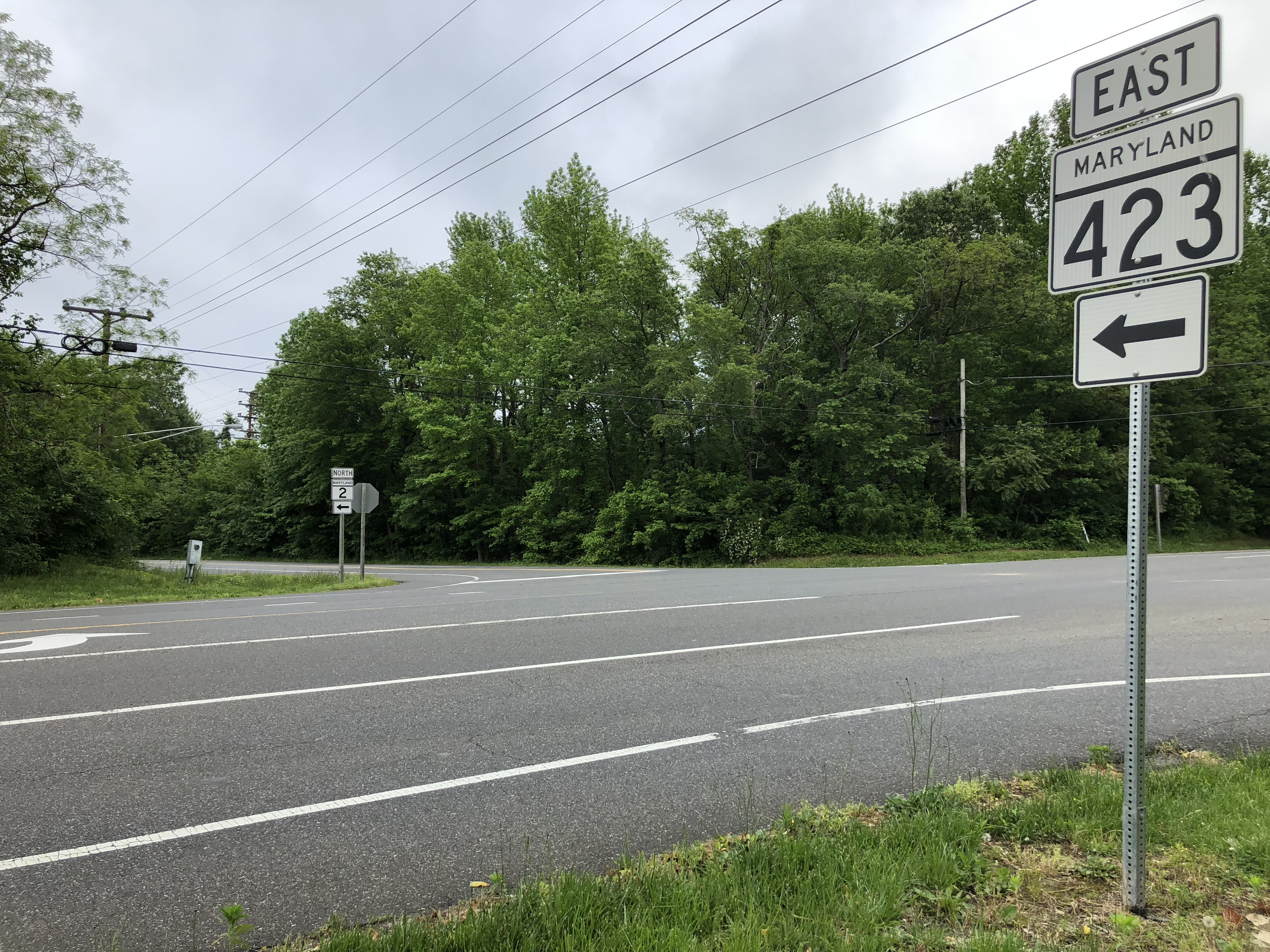
View east at the west end of MD 423 at MD 2 near Friendship

MD 423 begins at a four-way intersection with MD 2 (Solomons Island Road) north of the village of Friendship. The western leg of the intersection is Jewell Road, The highway heads east as a two-lane undivided road that meets the southern end of a segment of Old Solomons Island Road. MD 423 heads east until it reaches a four-way intersection with Town Point Road and Genoa Road. The state highway turns south and parallels the shore of Herring Bay. MD 423 crosses an inlet of Herring Bay before reaching its eastern terminus at Arundel Road in the hamlet of Fairhaven. Fairhaven Road continues south as a county highway toward MD 261 (Friendship Road).

== History ==
MD 423 was constructed as a gravel road from MD 2 at Webbs Corner (now Old Solomons Island Road) east to the southward turn in 1929 and 1930. The highway was extended south to its present terminus at Fairhaven in 1931 and 1932. MD 423 was extended west a short distance after MD 2 was relocated between 1957 and 1950.

== Junction list ==
The entire route is in Anne Arundel County.

| Location | mi | km | Destinations | Notes |
|---|---|---|---|---|
| Friendship | 0.00 | 0.00 | MD 2 (Solomons Island Road) / Jewell Road west – Annapolis, Prince Frederick | Western terminus |
| Fairhaven | 2.79 | 4.49 | Fairhaven Road south / Arundel Road east | Eastern terminus |
1.000 mi = 1.609 km; 1.000 km = 0.621 mi
