= Boal (disambiguation) =

Boal can refer to:

- Boal, Spanish municipality and civil parish in Asturias
- Boal (fish), Asian freshwater fish
- Boal (grape), a Portuguese wine grape
- Boal (surname), various people with the name

== See also ==
- Baudilus, a saint known in Spanish as San Boal
- Doña Blanca, a Spanish wine grape also known as Boal
