= Dubrow =

Dubrow is a surname. Notable people with the surname include:

- Evelyn Dubrow (1911–2006), labour lobbyist for the International Ladies' Garment Workers' Union
- Heather Dubrow (born 1969), American actress and television personality
- John Dubrow (born 1958), American painter
- Kevin DuBrow (1955–2007), American rock singer who was the lead vocalist of Quiet Riot
- Terry Dubrow (born 1958), American plastic surgeon and television personality

== See also ==
- Dubrow's Cafeteria, a defunct chain of cafeteria-style restaurants
