= Herring Bay =

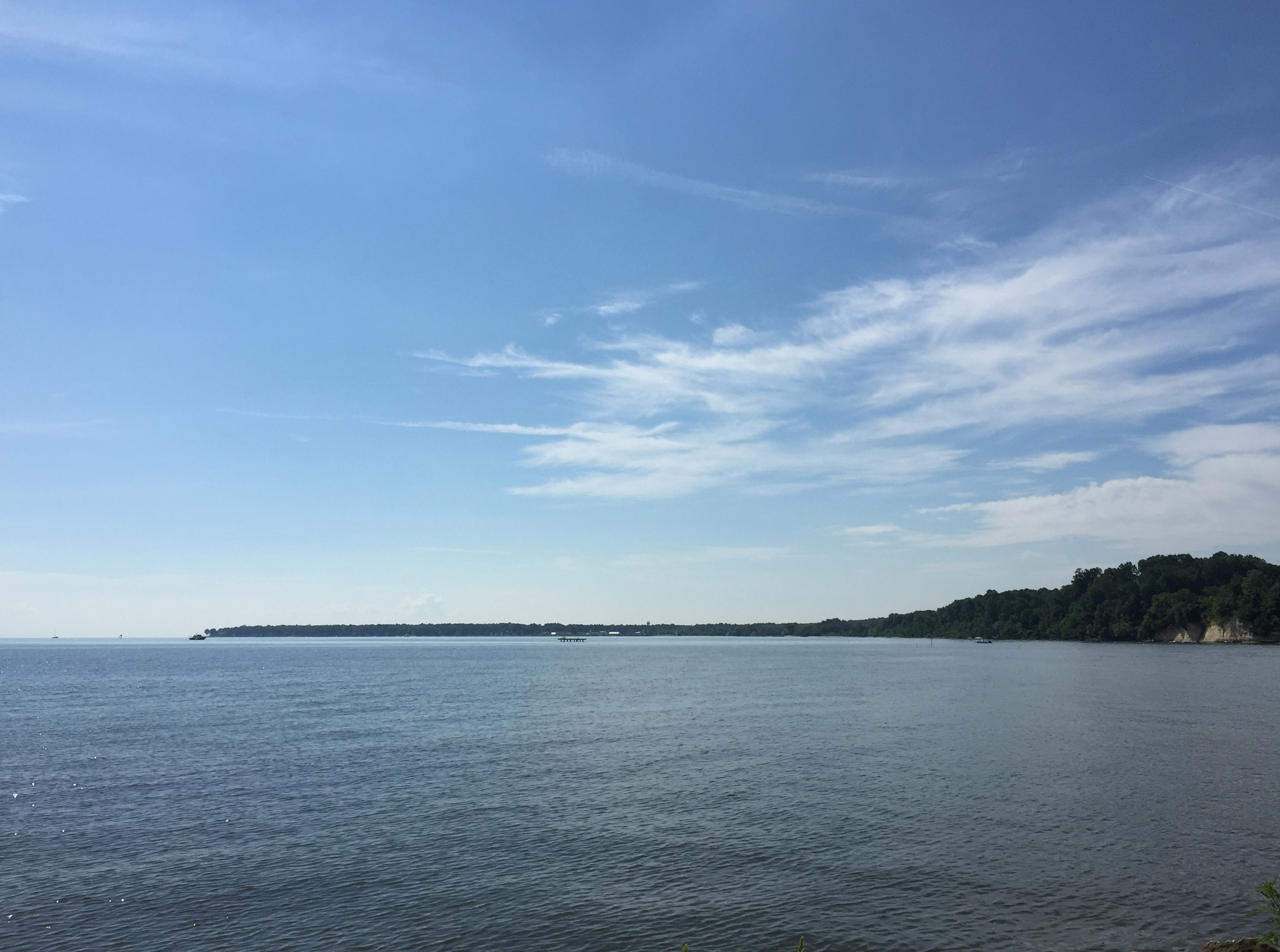
- View southeast across Herring Bay from MD 423 in Fairhaven-on-the-Bay

- Location within Maryland Location within the United States
- Location: Anne Arundel County
- Coordinates: 38°45′10″N 76°32′36″W
- Type: Bay
- Part of: Chesapeake Bay
- Surface elevation: 0 feet (0 m)

Herring Bay is a bay in Anne Arundel County in the U.S. state of Maryland. It lies in the mid-Chesapeake Bay along the western shore.
