= Browell =

Browell is a surname. Notable people with the surname include:

- George Browell (1884–1951), English footballer
- John Browell (1917–1997), British radio producer
- Tommy Browell (1892–1955), English footballer
- William Browell (1759–1831), Royal Navy captain

== See also ==
- Bowell
