= Blue Whale Harbour =

Anchorage in the South Atlantic

- Click on the map for a fullscreen view

Location
- Location: South Atlantic Ocean, Antarctica
- Coordinates: 54°4′S 37°1′W

Details
- Opened: 1930
- Operated by: Discovery Investigations personnel (1930s)
- Type of harbour: Harbour

Blue Whale Harbour (54°4′S 37°1′W) is a small, sheltered anchorage entered 1 nautical mile (2 km) west-southwest of Cape Constance, along the north coast of South Georgia Island. It was charted in 1930 by Discovery Investigations personnel, along with its constituent features. It is named for the blue whale, a commercially important species which was once widely distributed in polar and subpolar waters; numbers are now very small.

== Overview ==
The headland Brow Point defines the harbour's westernmost boundary. Shelter Point projects into the west side of the harbour. Blue Whale Mountain rises to 490 metres (1,600 ft) at the west side of Brow Point.

Clarity Point is a headland on the east shore of the harbor. The feature was charted and initially named Clear Point by DI personnel. The name was amended by the United Kingdom Antarctic Place-Names Committee (UKAPC) in 1991 to avoid duplication of Clear Point at Leith Harbor in Stromness Bay. Cone Point marks the east side of the entrance to the harbour. The name appears to be first used on a 1931 British Admiralty chart.
