= Loren G. Brown =

American author (1920–1996)

Loren Gerome Brown, nicknamed "Totch", (March 12, 1920 – May 8, 1996) was an author of historical accounts and first-hand descriptions of life in the Florida Everglades. He wrote Totch, A Life in the Everglades. The book describes Floridians survived off the land from the late 1800s until recent times.

His real name and nickname were given to him by a family friend who was the caretaker for the Indiana family's winter home in Florida. At age 13 he quit school to work full-time during the Great Depression. He was a commercial fisherman on the Gulf of Mexico and Florida Bay, hunted gators, and was an infantryman at the Battle of the Bulge during World War II, earning a Bronze Star. He was also a drug runner and did time in prison for tax evasion, being arrested as part of Operation Everglades. His family lives in Chokoloskee.

"While life in the Everglades was no picnic, the privilege of living a free life that close to nature was worth all the hardships that came with it: coping with alligators, panthers, and rattlesnakes on muddy lands filled with poison ivy, spiders, and mosquitoes so thick you could rake `em off your brow by the handful."
