= Everglades Foundation =

Nonprofit organization in Florida, U.S.

The Everglades Foundation
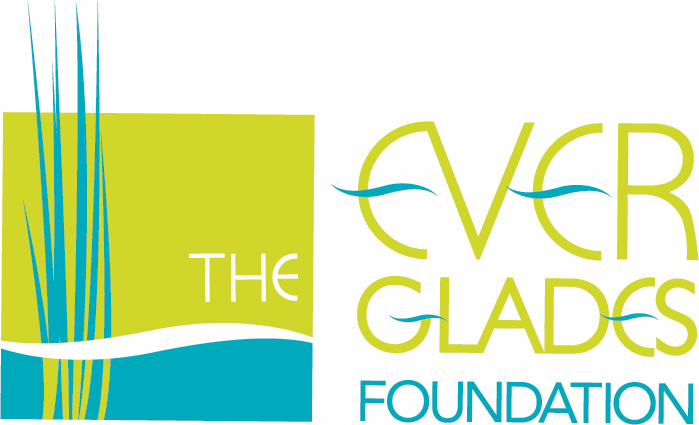
- Founded: 1993
- Type: 501(c)(3) not-for-profit
- Purpose: Environmentalism
- Location: Palmetto Bay, Florida
- Region served: Florida Everglades
- Method: Science-based research, programs, education, advocacy, communications
- Key people: Chairman, Carlos de la Cruz Jr. CEO, Eric Eikenberg
- Website: www.evergladesfoundation.org

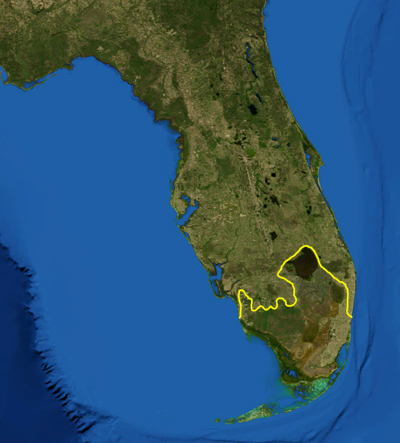
Satellite image from NASA showing the Everglades ecoregion as delineated by the World Wide Fund for Nature. The region south of the yellow line includes Lake Okeechobee, the Everglades, the Big Cypress Swamp, the Atlantic Coastal Ridge, the estuarine mangroves of the Ten Thousand Islands, and Florida Bay.

The Everglades Foundation was formed by a group of outdoor enthusiasts, environmentalists and residents of Florida who were concerned over the decline of the Everglades and the resulting damage in the nearby natural and protected areas such as Florida Bay. The original founding members, the late George Barley, a wealthy Orlando developer, and billionaire Paul Tudor Jones II, spearheaded the organization's growth, and shared the same concern over the steady decline of the environmental balance in this unique and delicate ecosystem due to poor water management and pollution.

The Foundation was created and founded in 1993, and is currently operated as a not-for-profit 501(c)(3) charitable organization. This organization is supported by noteworthy performers, professional athletes, and business persons, including Jimmy Buffett and golfer Jack Nicklaus.

== Focus ==
The Everglades Foundation is dedicated to restoring and protecting America's Everglades through science, advocacy, and education, thereby advancing an understanding of the Greater Everglades ecosystem and its irreplaceable environmental and economic value. The organization is funded primarily from private donations. The Foundation's Board covers administrative and fundraising expenses separately each year. This allows the Foundation to state that 100 percent of each donation goes directly to support programs to restore the Everglades. Donations provide scientists, policy analysts, researchers, communications experts and other professionals with funding to address complex issues involved in saving the River of Grass. The Everglades Foundation directs some of its resources toward organizations that hold congruent philosophies on Everglades restoration. Foundation-supported grant programs allow collaboration instead of competition with several non-profit organizations to focus efforts instead of working individually on like-minded environmental concerns.

The organization employs Ph.D-level scientists who work to promote the understanding of the greater Everglades ecosystem. The Foundation provides its expertise and research to partner organizations in addition to grant funding. This is one of the strengths of the organization, and as such, The Everglades Foundation is often called on to provide expertise on policy issues impacting the Everglades with local governments such as Miami-Dade County, Florida, as well as the federal Comprehensive Everglades Restoration Plan (CERP) project.

== Everglades Foundation v. Thomas Van Lent ==
Thomas Van Lent was hired by the Everglades Foundation in 2005 and worked there for 17 years, rising to roles including head of the Science Department, vice president of programs, and director of science and policy. He was also the organization's internal IT administrator and had access to all foundation servers.

According to court records, the relationship began deteriorating in 2015 when Van Lent opposed policy positions taken by the Foundation's CEO Eric Eikenberg. The disagreement centered on the Everglades Agricultural Area (EAA) Reservoir, a component of the Comprehensive Everglades Restoration Plan (CERP). The Foundation accepted a compromise that reduced the reservoir from 60,000 acres to 10,000 acres on state-owned land. Van Lent authored a technical FAQ questioning whether the smaller, deeper reservoir would meet water quality standards and whether the models used by the South Florida Water Management District were accurate.

Van Lent has described the split as political science trumping science, while the Foundation described it as a management issue where Van Lent could no longer be trusted to speak on behalf of the Foundation.

Resignation

In early February 2022, Van Lent notified the Foundation he would resign at the end of the month. On his last day he announced on social media he would join Friends of the Everglades, a rival organization he described as putting "facts over politics".

Before departing, Van Lent deleted hundreds of thousands of files from the Foundation's servers and destroyed all usable data on his Foundation-issued laptop, resetting it to factory settings. Van Lent said he was trying to separate personal records (banking, health care, family photos) from work records because his only computer was the work laptop, and that his attempt to re-upload a cleaned work folder failed due to slow internet.

Lawsuit and trade secrets claim

In April 2022, five weeks after his resignation, the Everglades Foundation filed a lawsuit in Miami-Dade circuit court against Van Lent for breach of contract, conversion, and misappropriation of trade secrets. The Foundation alleged a "secret campaign of theft and destruction" motivated by a plot to "enrich himself" by misappropriation of trade secrets including business activities, donor lists, and research.

Van Lent denied stealing secrets and accused the Foundation of attempting to "bully, harass, scare, smear and silence" him. Conservationists including Stuart Pimm commented that the concept of trade secrets is incompatible with science, saying "You cannot have trade secrets and call it science".

The Foundation sought and obtained a temporary injunction on April 11, 2022 ordering Van Lent to: cease use and disclosure of confidential information, return all Foundation materials, cease deletion of materials, and deliver devices to a forensic examiner.

Contempt proceedings

In June 2022 the parties entered a settlement agreement and stipulated permanent injunction prohibiting Van Lent from using or disclosing confidential information.

A forensic examination in September 2022 found that after the April injunction Van Lent had:

- deleted over 760,000 items including user files and applications data from his laptop

- deleted over 11,000 emails and email attachments

- deleted approximately 9,000 KeepIt files, installed Hider Pro (an anti-forensics program) and then deleted it, used Encrypto to encrypt and then delete files, and used CleanMyMac X

- reformatted a hard drive multiple times, leaving it devoid of recoverable data

Based on this, the Foundation moved for indirect criminal contempt. In May 2023, after a two-day hearing where Van Lent admitted he chose not to follow the temporary injunction, the trial court found him guilty of indirect criminal contempt. He was sentenced to 10 days in jail and ordered to pay the Foundation's legal fees. Van Lent reported to jail on July 17, 2023.

Appeal and current status

Van Lent appealed. On October 30, 2024, Florida's Third District Court of Appeal affirmed the conviction, holding the trial court's judgment comes with a presumption of correctness.

The Foundation has characterized the case as strictly an employment issue related to destruction of hundreds of thousands of documents. The original civil claims for misappropriation of trade secrets remained to be adjudicated separately as of 2023, with Van Lent facing bankruptcy due to legal costs.

Van Lent now works at Friends of the Everglades.

== Key personnel ==
- Carlos de la Cruz Jr. - Chairman
- Eric Eikenberg - CEO

== Fundraising ==
The Everglades Foundation holds annual benefits known as the ForEverglades Benefit in Palm Beach, Florida, in February, and the ForEverglades Naples Benefit in Naples, Florida, in March, to increase awareness and funding to support scientific research and other programs related to Everglades restoration. The Everglades Foundation also dedicates funds for legal action to ensure the protection of the Everglades if needed.
