= Fairhaven, Anne Arundel County, Maryland =

Unincorporated community in Maryland, United States

Fairhaven, Maryland
- Unincorporated community
- Location within the state of Maryland Fairhaven, Maryland (the United States)
- Coordinates: 38°44′39″N 76°33′28″W
- Country: United States of America
- State: Maryland
- County: Anne Arundel
- Time zone: UTC-5 (Eastern (EST))
  - Summer (DST): UTC-4 (EDT)

Fairhaven is an unincorporated community in Anne Arundel County, Maryland, United States. Maryland Route 423 connects Fairhaven with Maryland Route 2, which goes north to Annapolis, the state capital, and south to Prince Frederick, the county seat of Calvert County.
