= Florida upland hardwood forest =

The upland hardwood forests of Florida are closed canopy forests dominated by deciduous and evergreen trees, and shrubs.

== Description ==
The upland hardwood forest biome is a closed canopy forest containing deciduous and evergreen trees in the canopy and subcanopy, as well as shrubs in the subcanopy. Limestone outcrops are common in Upland Hardwood Forests. Common species of Upland Hardwood Forests are southern magnolia (Magnolia grandiflora), Pignut Hickory (Carya glabra), American sweetgum (Liquidambar styraciflua), Florida Maple (Acer floridanum), Live Oak (Quercus virginiana), Laurel Oak (Quercus hemisphaerica), Swamp Chestnut Oak (Quercus michauxii), White Ash (Fraxinus americana), loblolly pine (Pinus taeda), American beech (Fagus grandifolia), and Spruce Pine (Pinus glabra). The mid-story canopy consists of American Holly (Ilex opaca), Redbay (Persea borbonia), American Hornbeam (Carpinus caroliniana), Gum bully (Sideroxylon lanuginosum), Devil's Walkingstick (Aralia spinosa), American Hophornbeam (Ostrya virginiana), Flowering Dogwood (Cornus florida), Eastern Redbud (Cercis canadensis), Winged Elm (Ulmus alata), and Black cherry (Prunus serotina). In the Florida Panhandle the Upland Hardwood Forest contains several species that are more common north of there. In the Florida Peninsula the amount of evergreens increases and species richness decreases as northern deciduous species (American beech, white oak) reach their southern limits. Upland Hardwood Forest in Central Florida, at the southern end of its range (especially along the Brooksville Ridge), is often hard to differentiate from Mesic Hammock.
