= Clear Point =

Headland in Stromness Bay, South Georgia

Clear Point (54°8′S 36°40′W) is a headland forming the northeast side of the entrance to Leith Harbour, Stromness Bay, on the north coast of South Georgia. The name appears to be first used on a 1929 British Admiralty chart.
