= John Dubrow =

American painter

John Dubrow (born 1958) is an American painter.

== Biography ==
John Dubrow was born in Salem, Massachusetts in 1958. He attended Syracuse University, the Camberwell College of Arts in London, and the San Francisco Art Institute. His early influences include the Bay Area Figurative Movement, especially Richard Diebenkorn, David Park and Bruce McGaw, and the abstract expressionist Julius Hatofsky.

He has painted rooftops in New York City and Jerusalem, and portraits, including William Bailey, Marc Fumaroli and Mark Strand. While painting his portraits, the subjects are allowed to move and talk to him. Instead of a sketchbook, he uses an iPad, then completes his paintings in his studio in New York City.

Since the 1980s, his work has been exhibited at the Lori Bookstein Fine Art, the Salander- O'Reilly Galleries, the Contemporary Realist Gallery in San Francisco, etc.
