= Broward =

Broward may refer to:

- Broward County, Florida
- Napoleon B. Broward (1857–1910), Florida governor after which the county is named
- Robert C. Broward (1926–2015), American architect and author

== See also ==
- Search for"Broward"
