= Alexander Browder =

British financial crime researcher

- Browder, after presenting his HJS report in parliament (2026)
- Born: 2009 (age 16–17)
- Occupations: Student, financial crime researcher
- Known for: Founder of the Global Cryptocurrency Laundering Database

Alexander Browder (born 2009) is a British student and financial crime researcher. He is the founder of the Global Cryptocurrency Laundering Database and the author of a 2026 report, published by the Henry Jackson Society, on the alleged use of cryptocurrency networks by sanctioned states to evade Western sanctions. In June 2026, at the age of 17, he was placed on an entry-ban list by the Russian Foreign Ministry, making him one of the youngest people, and reportedly the first minor, to be sanctioned by Russia.

== Early life and family ==
Browder is the son of Sir Bill Browder, the American-born British financier and political activist who campaigned for the Magnitsky Act after the death of his lawyer Sergei Magnitsky in Russian custody in 2009. Bill Browder was himself barred from Russia in 2005. Alexander Browder has said that his family's history of investigating Russian corruption influenced his own interest in illicit finance.

Browder grew up in London. As of 2026, he was a secondary school student.

== Research ==
Browder founded the Global Cryptocurrency Laundering Database, a project tracking the movement of illicit funds through digital-asset markets. It is the first and largest open-source database of cryptocurrency laundering.

Browder then authored a 90-page report detailing how bad actors are abusing cryptocurrency and how to stop it. In March 2026, the Henry Jackson Society, a London-based think tank, published his report: Confronting the Illicit-Finance Hydra in Crypto Markets: Protecting Retail Investors and Disrupting Hostile Government Exploitation. The report alleged that states including Russia, Iran and North Korea had laundered approximately US$350 billion through cryptocurrency, and identified the rouble-backed stablecoin A7A5 as a central mechanism for Russian sanctions evasion. On 3 March 2026, Browder launched his report at the Palace of Westminster at a cross-party panel with MPs Tom Tugendhat, Phil Brickell, and Chris Coghlan.

On 6 March 2026, Browder submitted written evidence to the House of Lords Financial Services Regulation Committee inquiry into stablecoins. In that submission, he described A7A5 as a Russian stablecoin launched in January 2025 in partnership with Promsvyazbank, and argued that it had become “a critical tool” for sanctions evasion and illicit cross-border payments.

On 18 March 2026, Browder was invited to testify before a House of Commons public bill committee considering the Representation of the People Bill. In oral evidence, he argued that cryptocurrency donations should not be allowed without a proper regulatory framework and suggested reporting, custody, and investigative reforms to reduce the risk of foreign or criminal interference in UK elections. After his oral evidence, the UK Government banned political donations in cryptocurrency.

Browder worked with the Telegraph to expose two UK-Registered cryptocurrency exchanges which were processing billions for the IRGC, which he describes as 'particularly egregious'. Companies House later struck off the two companies.

On 22 April 2026, on the back of Browder’s report, 26 senior UK MPs and Peers wrote to the UK Foreign Secretary urging sanctions on named Kyrgyz officials alleged to be enabling the Russian stablecoin A7A5. The signatories included 11 Peers and 15 MPs across party lines. Browder stated that “Kyrgyzstan shouldn't be allowed to enable Russia to evade the UK sanctions by harbouring Russian stablecoin operations, which ultimately lead to thousands of Ukrainian deaths.” On 26 May 2026, the UK Government responded to the letter by sanctioning many of the enablers within the state of Kyrgyzstan.

On 9 June 2026, Browder was invited to 10 Downing Street to speak to the UK Prime Minister's advisers on how to encourage more youth ambition in the UK.

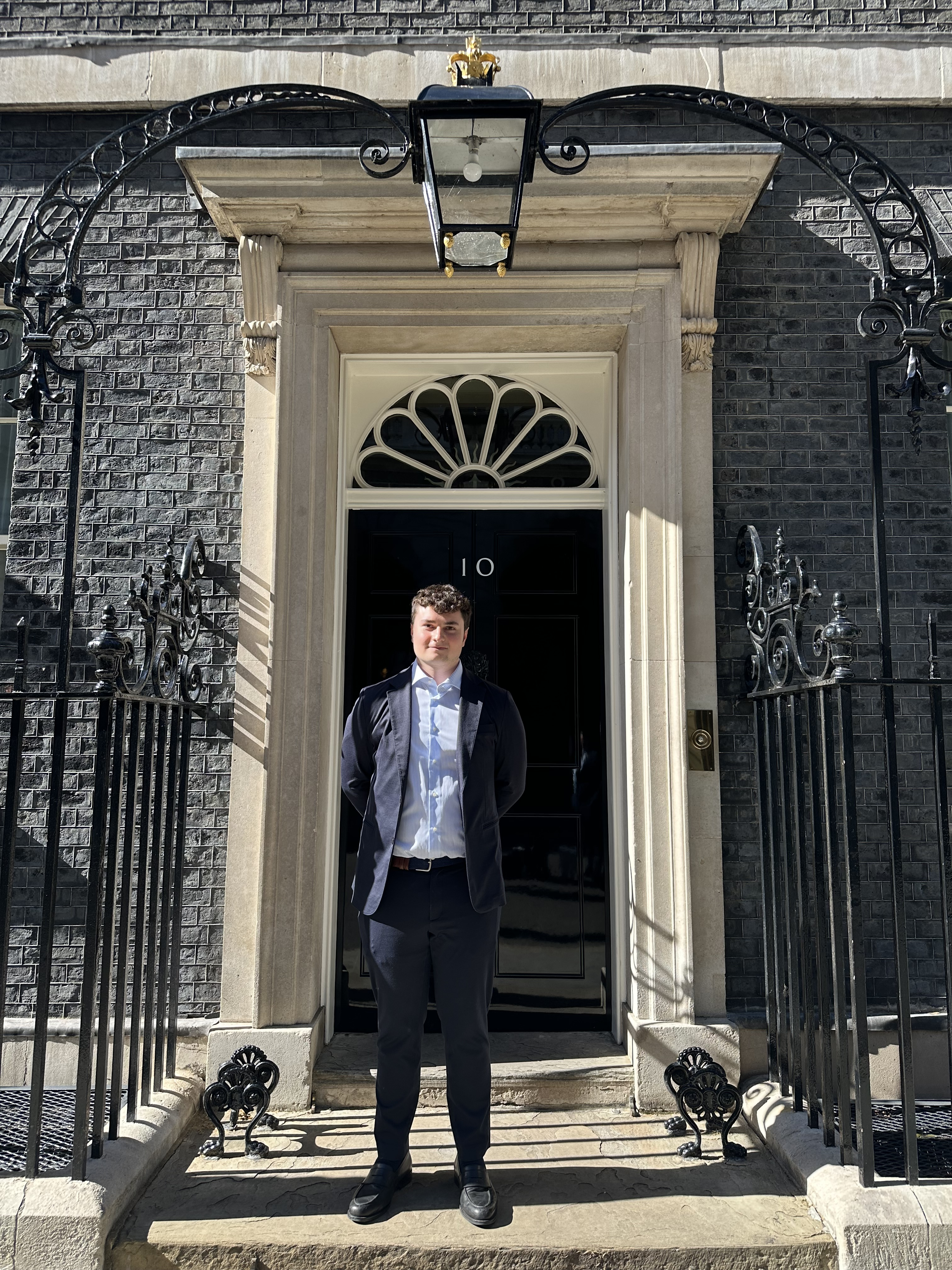
Browder outside 10 Downing Street

== Sanctions by Russia ==
On 2 June 2026, the Russian Foreign Ministry added Browder to its list of British nationals banned from entering the Russian Federation, accusing him of publishing what it characterised as defamatory and false information; Russian officials described the report as "disinformation". He was sanctioned alongside four other British nationals: the journalists Catherine Belton of The Washington Post and Richard Holmes of The i Paper, Committed to Good managing director Alice Mary Laugher, and Chelsea Group founder Richard Nicholas Westbury.

Browder is believed to be the youngest person ever targeted by Russia's sanctions regime.

== Reaction ==
Browder responded publicly to the sanctions, describing them as "a badge of honour" and stating that the designation indicated his research had "touched a nerve". He told Sky News that the Kremlin's decision confirmed that following the money trail had made it uncomfortable, and said he would not be deterred from continuing his work.

Andrii Sybiha, Ukraine's foreign minister, publicly thanked Browder for his courage and said that his work had helped the “shared cause” of exposing Russian crimes and countering Russian aggression. In addition stating 'Thanks to active and principled young people like you, we in Ukraine feel we are not alone.'

The George W. Bush Presidential Center commented that while the sanctioning of a 17-year-old might appear laughable, the underlying effort by authoritarian states to construct workarounds to Western sanctions represented a serious long-term strategic challenge for democracies.
