= Browde =

Browde is a surname. Notable people with the surname include:

- Jules Browde (1919–2016), South African lawyer, human rights activist, and Jewish communal leader
- Kristen Browde (born 1950), American attorney and politician
- Ric Browde (born 1954), American author, record producer, and songwriter
