= Windy Cove =

Windy Cove (54°4′S 36°58′W) is a small bay entered 0.6 nautical miles (1.1 km) southeast of Antarctic Point on the north coast of South Georgia. The bay was named Whatahope Bay, probably by DI personnel who charted this coast in 1929, but is known locally as Windy Cove. It is probable that this latter name, originally given by DI personnel in 1929 to the next bay to the northwest (now Tornquist Bay, q.v.), was erroneously transferred to this feature. Since Whatahope Bay is unknown locally, the name Windy Cove as applied to this feature is approved.
