= Florida Ecological Greenways Network =

Florida Ecological Greenways Network work to provide a "system of native landscapes and ecosystems that supports native plant and animal species, sustains clean air, water, fisheries, and other natural resources, and maintains the scenic natural beauty that draws people to visit and settle in Florida," as stated Florida Greenways Commission. It also functions to devise a plan for a statewide greenways system, based on GIS (Geographic Information System) technology and suggestions from the public. The GIS data used includes soil, water, and geological information, wildlife movements and habitat data, as well as existing trails and parks, transportation and infrastructure fixtures, educational and historical sites, and political boundaries. This system would be created in accordance with the December 1994 report from the Florida Greenways Commission to the Governor of the state of Florida, a report which outlined the protocol for creating it. Such a system would connect all aspects of the state's "green infrastructure", making it more comprehensive for use by the state's citizens and more effective in achieving greater sustainability throughout the state of Florida for generations to come.

Such sustainability would be achieved through the various goals of the project, primarily a conservation effort to preserve Florida's existing ecosystems and landscapes, such as the Loxahatchee River at Jonathan Dickinson State Park and the Broward Urban River Trail in Fort Lauderdale, while taking into account the habitats of native species such as the Florida panther, the Florida black bear and the crested caracara (their habitat data was taken into account when the network was updated) as well as to connect these remain systems and maintain their ability to function as "dynamic systems", as well as adapt to "future environmental changes", such as to mitigate the effects of climate change.

The network is used as a main data source, Florida Forever, for identifying the most significant and intact landscapes for conserving in the state. The project is a collaboration of many groups and leadership has gone from the Florida Greenways Commission (Commission), the Florida Greenways Coordinating Council (FGCC) with support from the state Department of Environmental Protection's (DEP) Office of Greenways and Trails (OGT), and the Florida Greenways and Trails Council (FGTC). All three organizations worked with support from professors, staff, and students of the University of Florida GeoPlan Center, the Department of Landscape Architecture, the Department of Wildlife Ecology and Conservation, and the Department of Urban and Regional Planning (University).

== Foundations and history ==
The basis for the FEGN is in the state recreational trails system, approved by Legislature in 1979, as well as the Florida Canoe Trail System and preexisting parks, refuges and water and wildlife management areas. In 1991, the Florida Department of Environmental Protection established a Statewide Greenways Program to achieve greater coherence among the state's large ecologically significant places. Land acquisition for the purpose of conservation in Florida dates back to the early 1960s. The Greenways Program was developed to determine how conservation efforts could be distributed in order to best benefit the nature and people of Florida. In 1993, the Florida Greenways Commission was created, and it assumed guidance of the program, which includes public education programs in addition to the conceptual work of developing the Greenways system. Until 1995, Florida Greenways Commission worked with support from the 1000 Friends of Florida and The Conservation Fund to assess current greenways and plan for future greenways and state agency leadership of the project. The university compiled a database of existent conservation lands and trails in the state under FGC leadership. In 1995 leadership moved to the Florida Greenways Coordinating Council in cooperation with the state DEP's OGT. The university applied GIS software to identify "ecological and recreational hubs and links" to integrate into the network. Hubs are areas with highest-ranked ecological significance that are large enough to sustain key species and ecological processes. Links are the areas connecting the hubs and sites. In 1997, the FEGN, as part of the Florida Greenways Plan became authorized by state law. The Greenways Implementation Plan, a collaborative effort of " the Florida Greenways Commission, Florida Greenways Coordinating Council, state, regional, and federal agencies, scientists, university personnel, conservation groups, planners and the general public," was completed in 1998. The next year, the Florida Greenways and Trail Council (FGTC) took over the work of the Commission and the FGCC. Support from the OGT continued, and the OGT established an "official greenways designation process." In the following year, the Florida Greenways and Trails Council prioritized the network into 6 different levels of significance, based on their importance for maintaining statewide ecological connectivity. The university, using GIS software, developed a prioritization of land presenting the best opportunities to create a connected statewide ecological system in 2002. Jason Teisinger modeled development pressure, allowing prioritization of critical linkages based on ecological significance and pressure of development. In 2004 the boundaries of the Florida Ecological Network were updated and approved by the Florida Greenways and Trails Council in September., In 2005 Prioritization of land use was updated and approved by the Florida Greenways and Trails Council in November.

== Process ==
The University of Florida and Florida Department of Environmental Protection has been involved in the development of the Florida Ecological Greenway Network plan. The key elements considered in the formation of the greenway were land use, critical habitats for native species, ecologically important natural communities, wetlands, floodplains, primitive areas, and important aquatic ecosystems. In order to conserve Florida's native ecosystems and landscapes six strategies were used to help create the network design. These include "Identifying and conserving an integrated, statewide system of greenways that encompasses the full range of Florida's native ecosystems and landscapes Using Florida's rivers, springs, lakes, and other inland and coastal aquatic features as strategic building blocks in the statewide greenways system Linking a full range of regional landscapes through Florida's system of greenways that include publicly owned lands harboring native ecosystems and privately owned, highly managed forestry and agricultural properties Planning and managing the statewide system of greenways using the best information available about the requirements of Florida's native ecosystems and landscapes Addressing native ecosystem conservation and human use compatibility issues by developing greenway design and management guidelines Undertaking and/or supporting the research and monitoring efforts necessary to effectively plan and manage native ecosystems and landscapes within Florida's system of greenways." The first step of the design process involves using a GIS based design model to "categorize natural and built landscape features. Data used in the GIS model include natural areas and features, geological formations, soil types, watershed boundaries, wetlands, water bodies, floodplains, wildlife movement corridors, endangered species habitats, nature-based trails and parks, outdoor education sites, cultural and historical resource sites, distribution and type of built structures, existing and planned roads, railways, and trails; and political boundaries." The next step was to prioritize between high, medium, and low areas of importance. In order to do this efficiently and effectively, a specific set of criteria was used in the prioritization. The process involved; "meetings among state and regional officials to discuss criteria and data for selecting priorities, development by cooperators at the University of Florida of a GIS methodology to rank lands within the network for their relative value to statewide connectivity, application of additional filters to lands identified as high and moderate priorities to rank their potential importance as riparian corridors or to wide-ranging species such as bears and panthers; and the identification of the six priority classes."

Once the areas were prioritized based on relative importance it was necessary to assign critical linkage areas. These critical linkage areas are the portions of the network that serve the greatest importance to the protection of the FEGN. Critical linkages are designated as such, based on their ecological importance and the level of threat of development. Twenty-four linkages were proposed, after the selection process ten regions were designated critical linkage areas and will serve as the areas with the highest priorities for protecting. The decision-making process involves; determining the extent to which an area was necessary for the completion of the state greenway, the likelihood an area has of being converted or developed, and an analysis of land ownership and the feasibility of purchase. Of the 2.7 million acres of critical linkages, so far 17% of the greenway exists, 30% is proposed, and private landowners hold more than 50% of the land. Currently Florida Forever and other land conservation agencies are working on land acquisition purchases for many of these remaining properties.

== Results ==
As a result of the program, the FGTC has approved over 700,000 acres and nearly 1,500 miles of land and water trails for designation and ten critical linkages have been identified as high priorities for conservation. The FEGN system and organization has served as a model that exemplifies the use of hubs, links, and sites as critical to conservation, which is applicable on the regional, state and multi-state scale. The states of Maryland and Virginia, the New Jersey Conservation Foundation, the Saginaw Bay Greenways Collaborative in Michigan, the Chesapeake Bay Program, and the U.S. Environmental Protection Agency (EPA) in the southeast United States subsequently adopted the use of GIS software for work on the Ecological Network. The FEGN is also used as data for informing the Florida Forever Needs Assessment project and the Critical Lands and Waters Identification Project. Due to the emphasis placed on their habitats when protecting land in the FEGN, the success of the network could contribute heavily to the conservation of the Florida panther and the Florida black bear. Current progress on the network, lacks of support from the public and politicians, according to Tom Hoctor, PhD, director of the Center for Landscape and Conservation Planning at the university. Thus the project is focusing on creating a public awareness campaign that appeals to landowners.
