= Cape Constance =

Cape in South Georgia and the South Sandwich Islands

Cape Constance (54°3′S 36°59′W) is a cape that marks the northern tip of the peninsula between Antarctic Bay and Possession Bay on the north coast of South Georgia. Cape Constance was named in about 1912, after Constance Greene Allardyce, wife of Sir William L. Allardyce, Governor of the Falkland Islands, 1904–15.
