= Bowell =

Bowell is an English surname of Norman origin. Notable people with the surname include:

- Edward L. G. Bowell (1943–2023), American astronomer
- George Bennett Bowell (1875–1942), British horologist
- Horace Alexander William Bowell (1880–1957), English cricketer
- Mackenzie Bowell (1823–1917), Canadian prime minister
- Norman Bowell (1904–1943), English cricketer

== See also ==
- Bowell, Alberta
- Bowel
