= Brow Monument and Brow Monument Trail =

- Brow Monument
- U.S. National Register of Historic Places
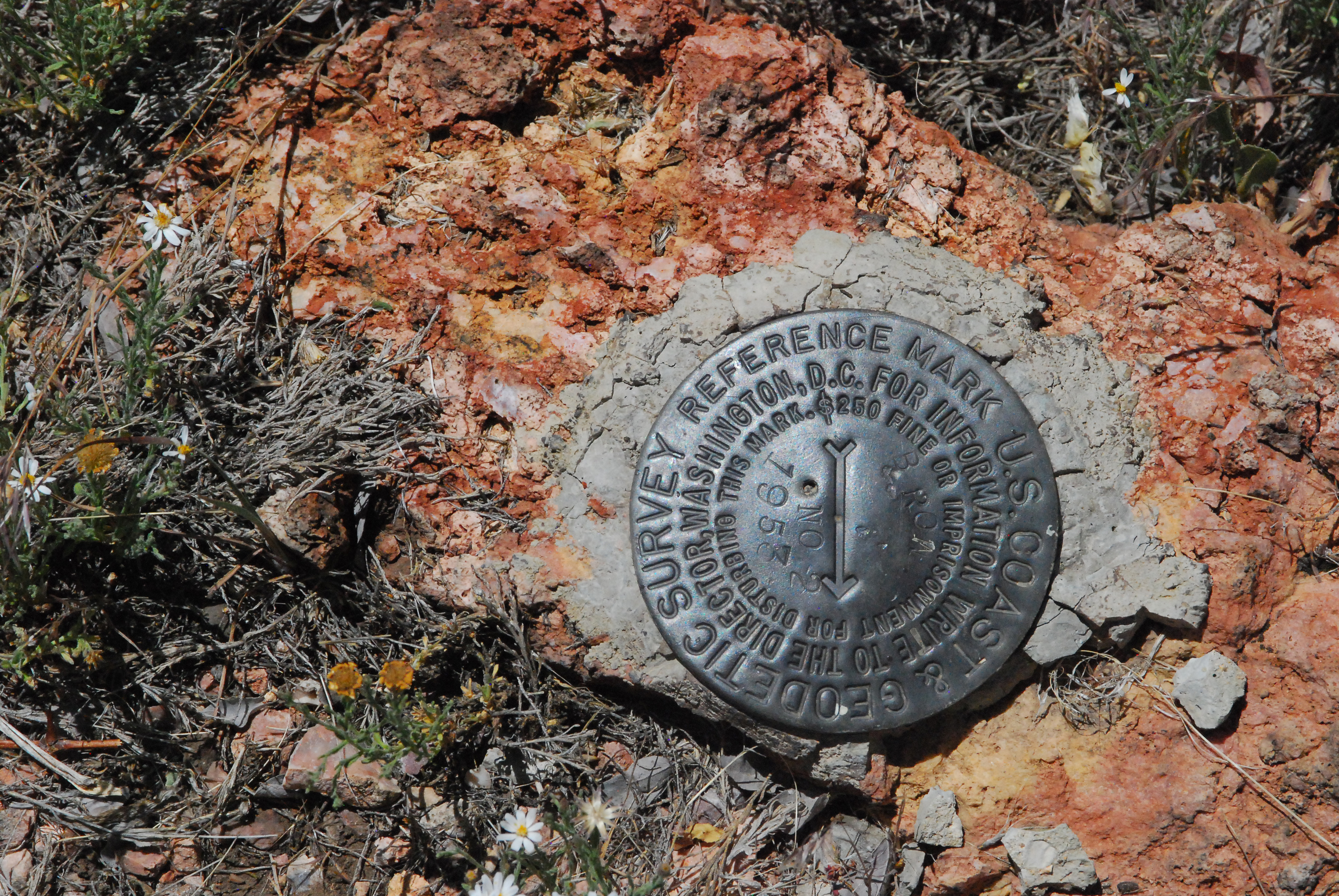
- United States Coast and Geodetic Survey reference marker

- Location within Arizona Location within the United States
- Location: Coconino County, Arizona
- Nearest city: Big Springs, Arizona
- Coordinates: 36°35.457′N 112°23.887′W
- Area: 0.2 acres (0.081 ha)
- Built: 1872
- NRHP reference No.: 87001159
- Added to NRHP: July 13, 1987

The Brow Monument is a monument listed in the National Register of Historic Places for Coconino County, Arizona, United States, located in the Kaibab National Forest. The site contains one of the few remaining survey markers used by the expedition of John Wesley Powell in 1872 It is accessible via the Brow Monument Trail.

== Brow Monument ==
The Brow Monument is listed in the National Register of Historic Places for Coconino County, Arizona. It is located on the "brow" of the North Kaibab Plateau in northern Arizona within the jurisdiction of the Kaibab National Forest. The National Register designation is to memorialize the John Wesley Powell surveying expedition of 1872. The site consists of one of the few remaining triangulation survey markers that were laid down by Powell's party. They were a key component in being able to calculate distances and topography in the early West by using a baseline and these triangulation points. The baseline for this survey was first laid out near the present-day towns of Fredonia, Arizona, and Kanab, Utah, some 30 miles north of the Brow marker. The survey markers were and continue to this day to also be referred to as "monuments", thus the term "Brow Monument" both defines the physical marker and represents a memorial for the expedition.

The surveying expedition commenced in February 1872 from Kanab, Utah and its base was at the Big Springs, Arizona homestead of Levi Stewart, a pioneer farmer. The first marker at what is today Brow Monument was set at this time. The original markers for this and other surveying expeditions were usually a large pyramid of stones, sometimes a blazed tree, a marked rock, or stacked or cribbed logs, with a red-and-white flag high above to facilitate telescope readings from considerable distances. Combined with information from barometric readings which established elevation above sea level, topographic maps could be drawn. The survey was completed in August of that year. In 1878, G. K. Gilbert, a member of the original surveying team, returned to the area to structurally improve the marker by constructing a wooden crib to support it.

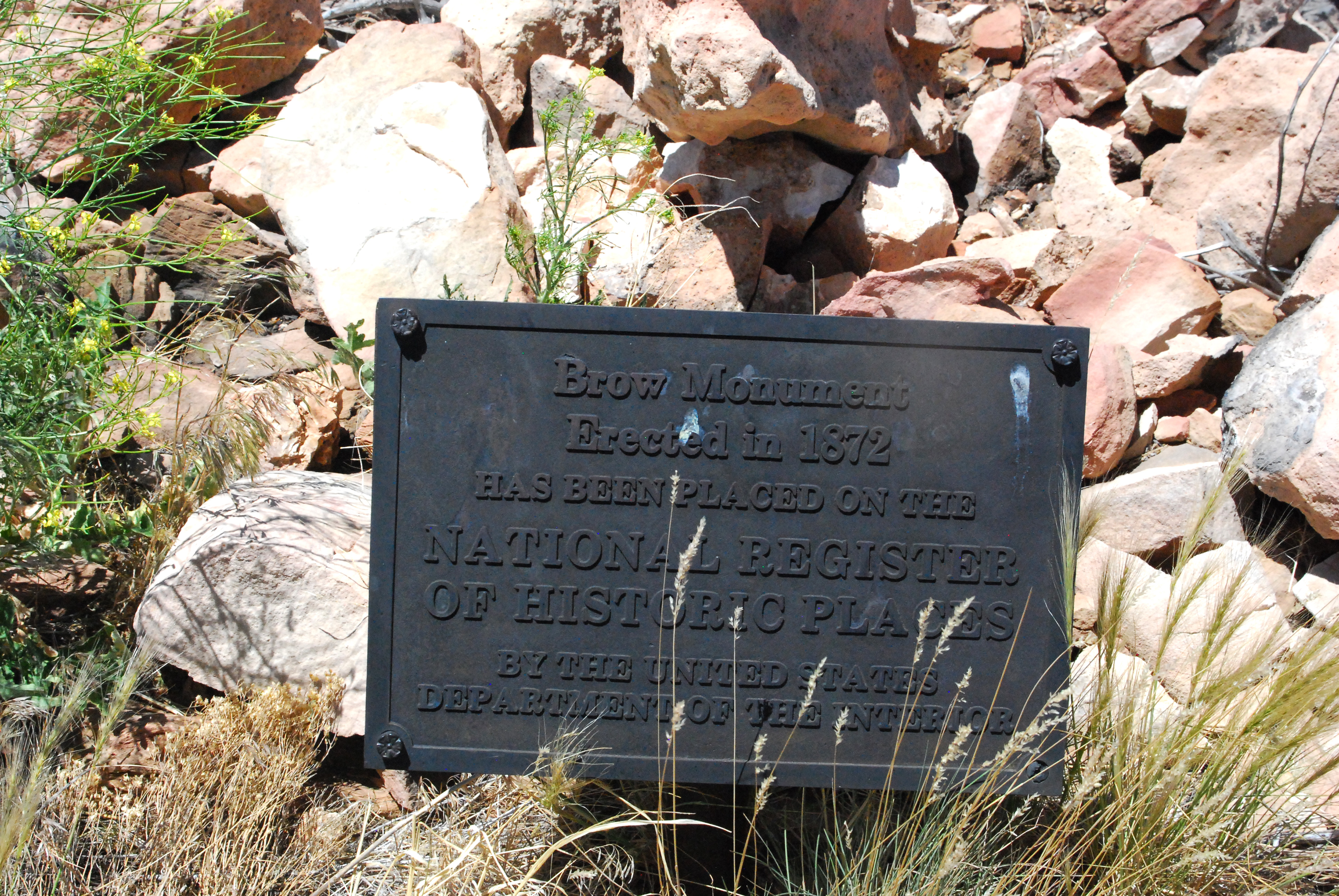
Memorial plaque at the original location

The measurements for the marker were remarkably accurate considering the technology of the time and the rough terrain in which the survey was conducted.

In 1933, a new monument was erected approximately 300 feet uphill from the original site by the U.S. Geological Survey. This new monument is now the official marker to be used in surveying. There is a brass cap survey marker at this new location. The original marker remains undisturbed except for the addition of a memorial plaque.

The historic significance of Brow Monument was officially recognized when it was listed on the National Register of Historic Places on July 13, 1987.

Brow Monument is mentioned on two maps; the topographic map located in the lobby of the North Kaibab National Forest visitor center in Jacob Lake, Arizona and in the National Forest Service "Kaibab National Forest North Kaibab Ranger District" map.

== Brow Monument Trail ==
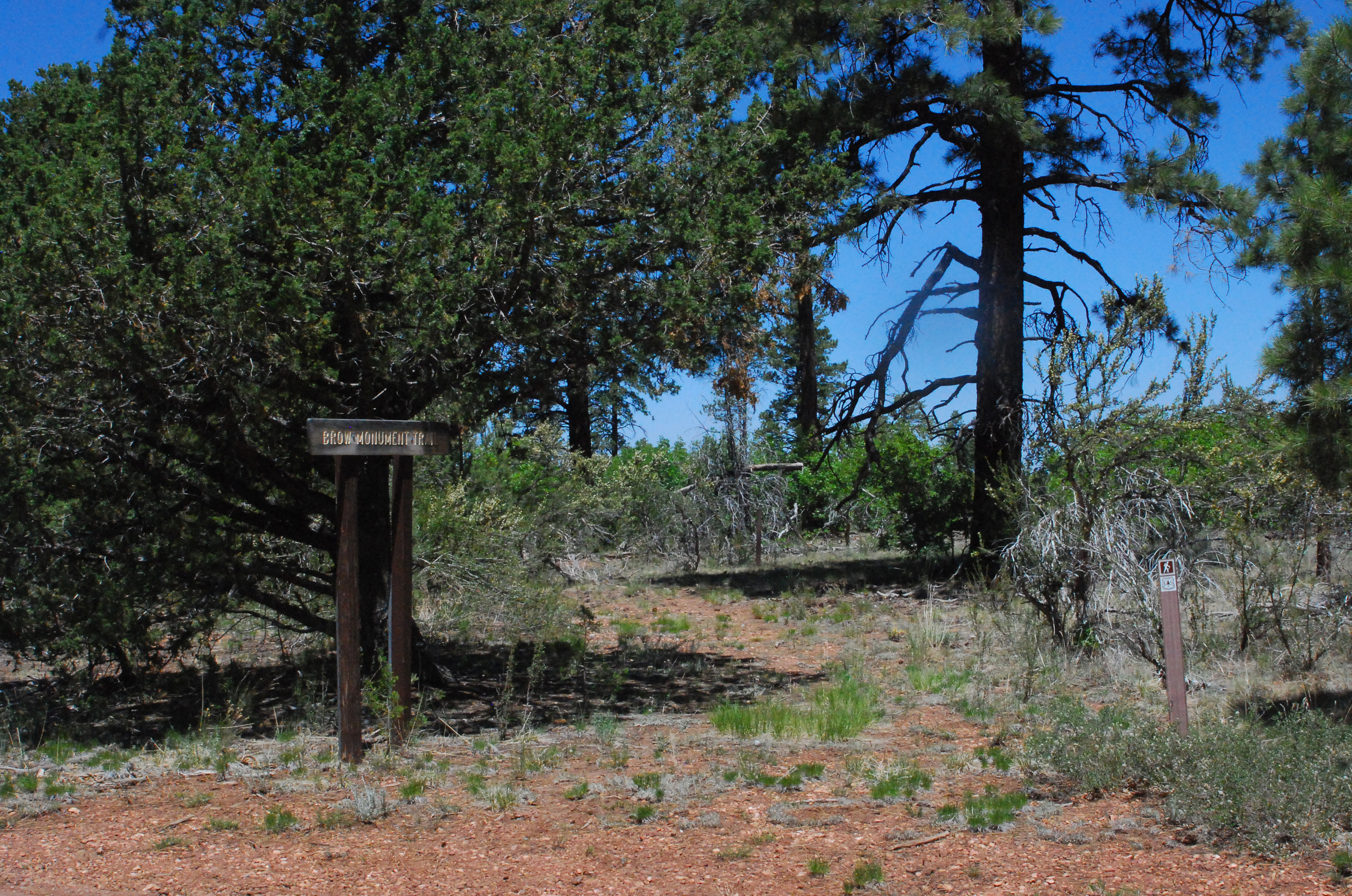
Trailhead on Brow Monument Trail

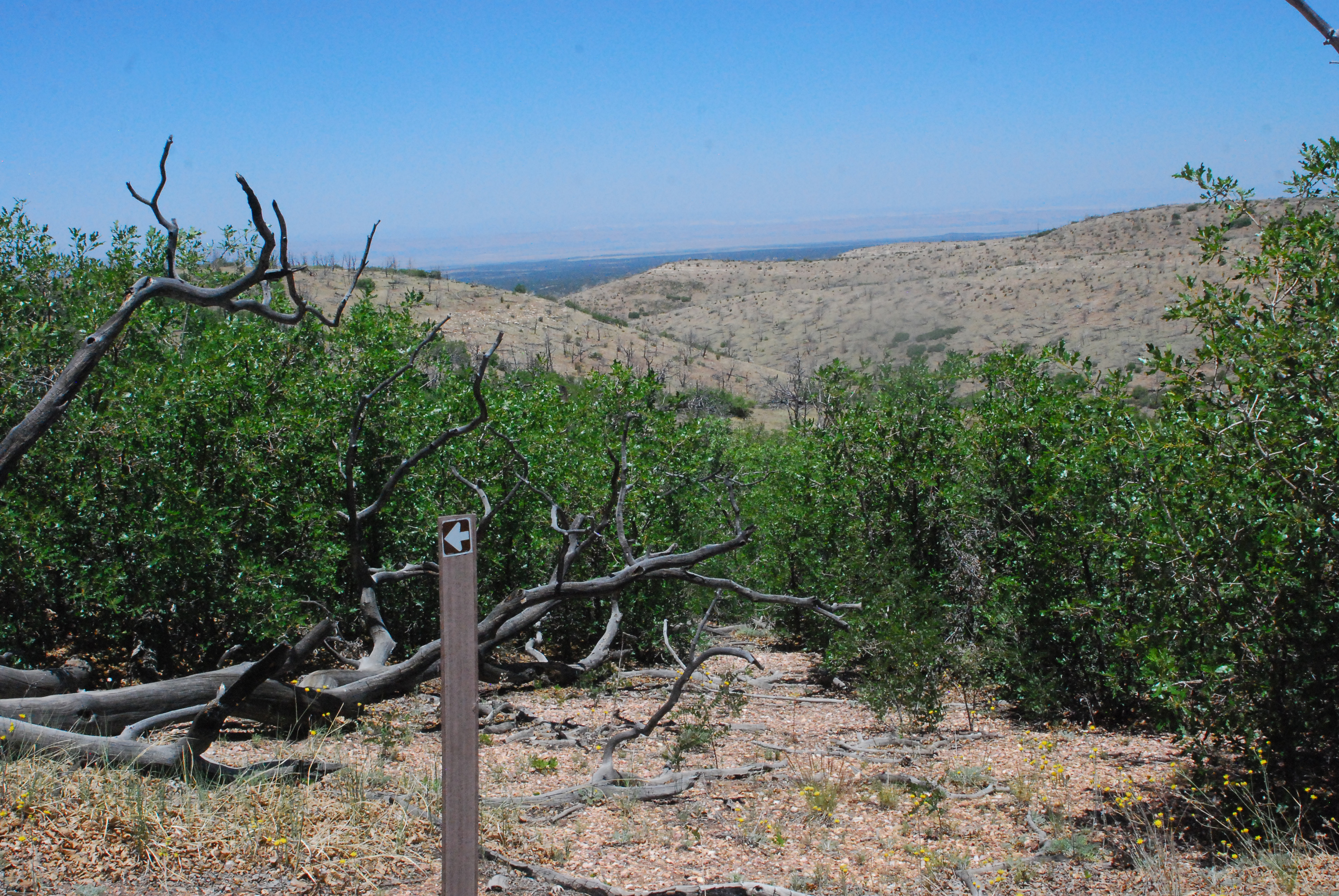
Waymarker on trail

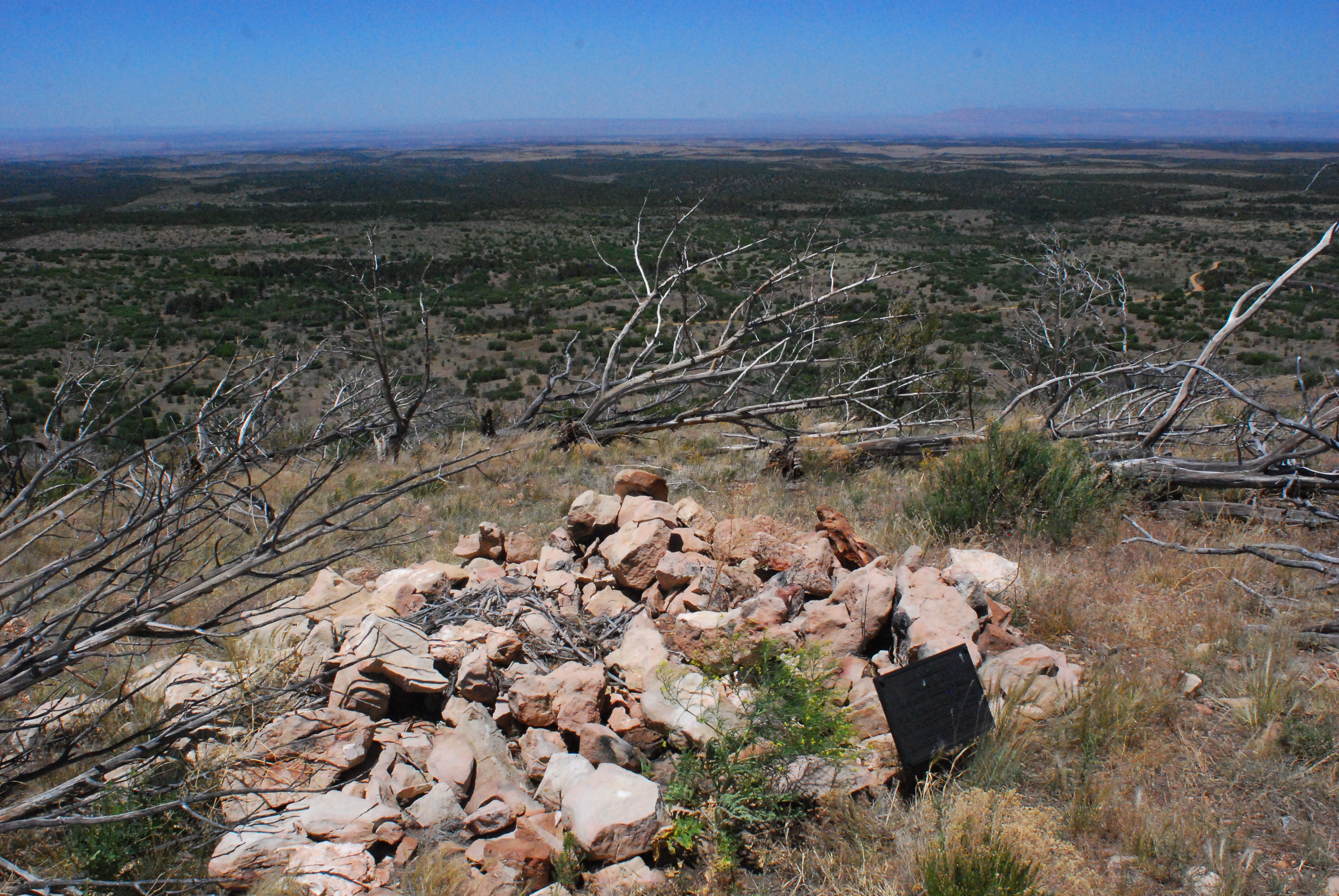
Brow Monument – Historic Rock Cairn Survey Marker

Brow Monument is reachable by foot via the Brow Monument Trail. The trailhead is located within the Kaibab National Forest and can be accessed by two-wheel drive passenger cars (in good weather) although high clearance four-wheel drive vehicles are recommended because of deep ruts and tree-fall on Forest Service roads. Access to the site can be limited in late fall to early spring because of heavy snowfall. The trailhead is shown on the NFS map with directions indicated by signage. From Arizona State Route 67, the trailhead is reached by driving from the Demotte Campground turnoff to Forest Service Road 22 sixteen miles north to Service Road 477, then a quarter-mile west to FS Road 252; after a half-mile FS Road 252 reaches FS Road 252c, which runs one and a half miles to the trailhead (36°35.002′N 112°23.207′W). The trail itself is marked approximately every 200 feet and there is informational signage also along the open ridge walk (see "Gallery" below). The trail is posted as being two miles long, requiring approximately 30 minutes to walk to the Monument (36°35.457′N 112°23.887′W) at an average pace.

== Gallery ==
There are a number of National Forest Service signposts along the Brow Monument Trail.

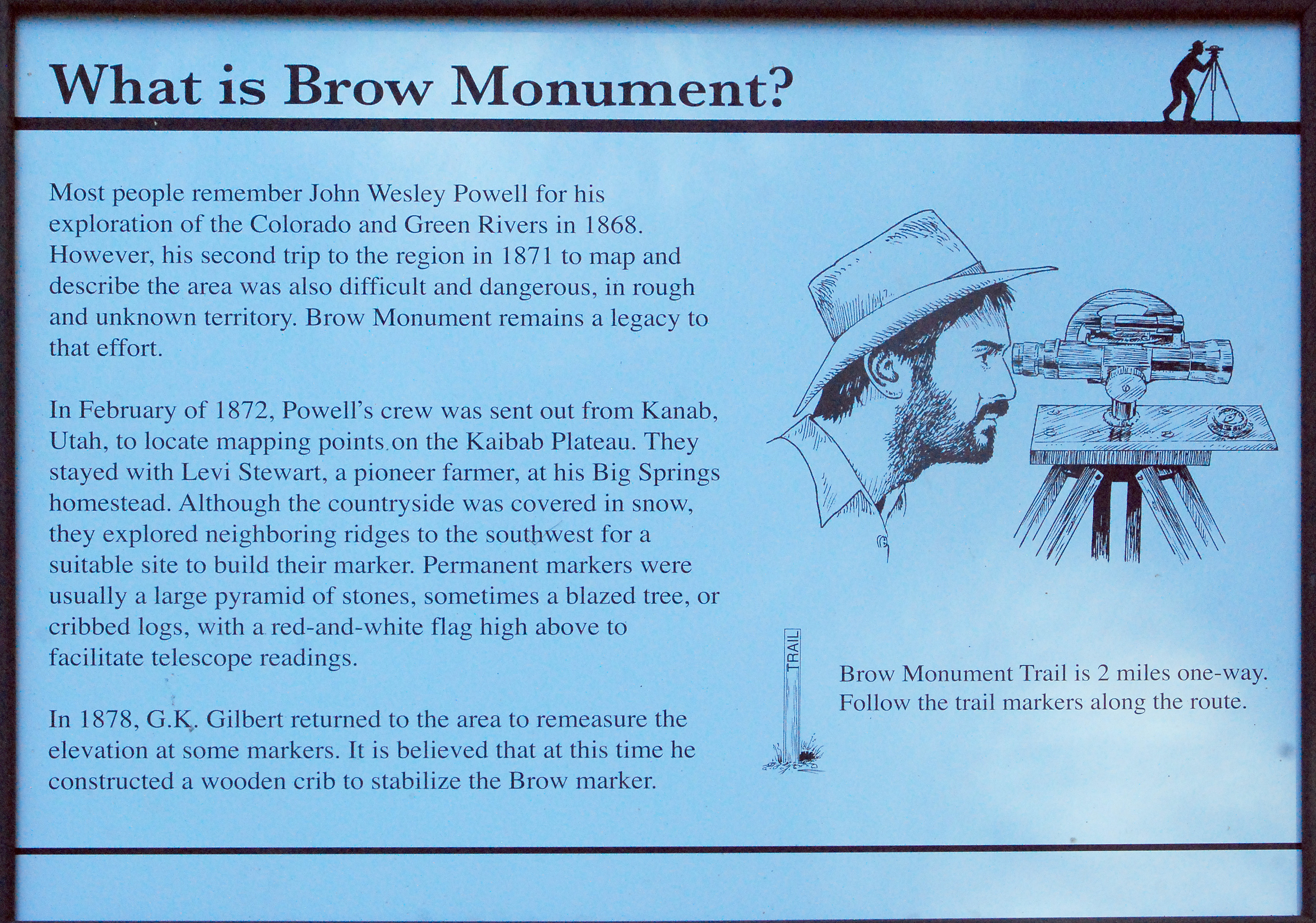
"What is Brow Monument?"

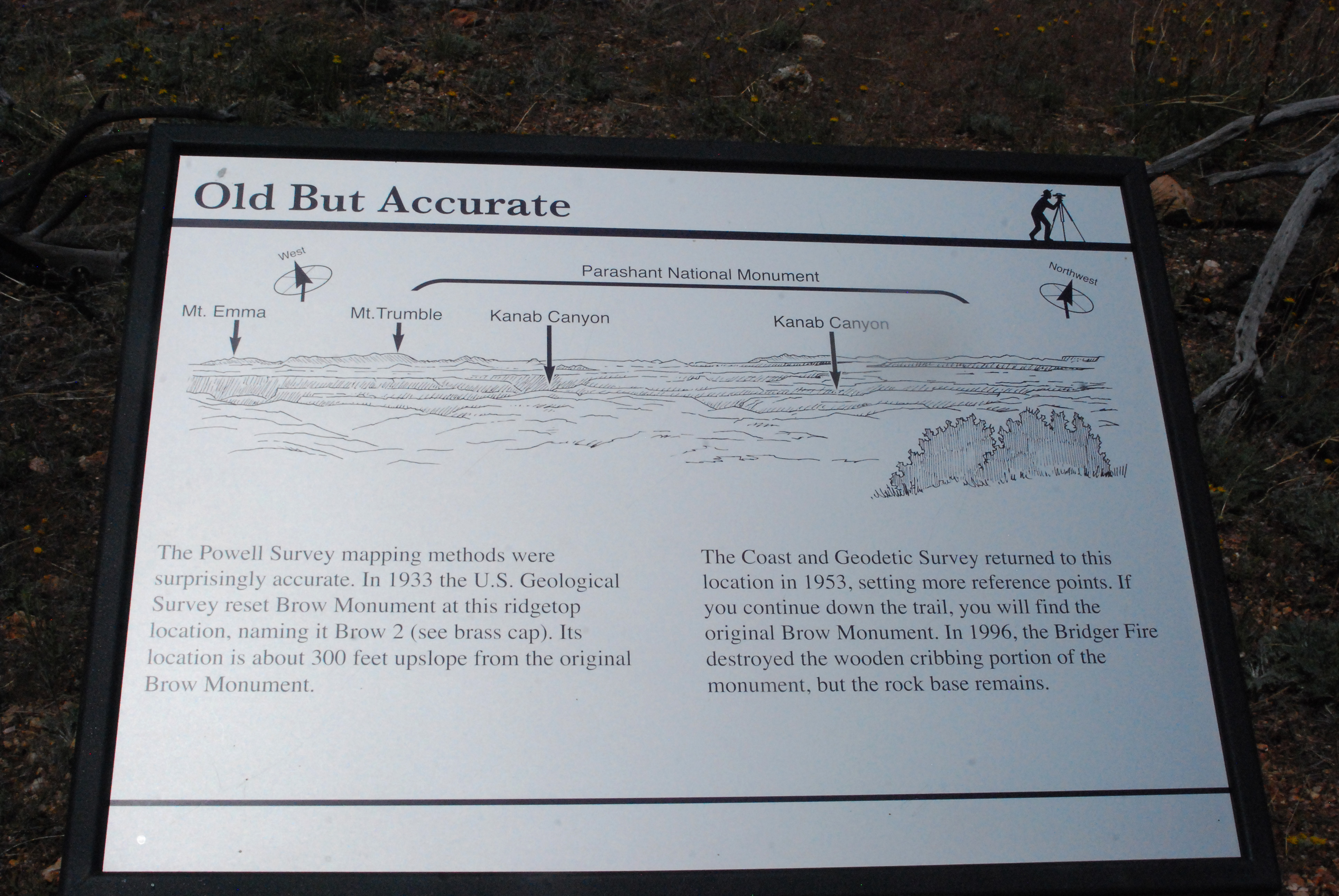
"Old but Accurate"

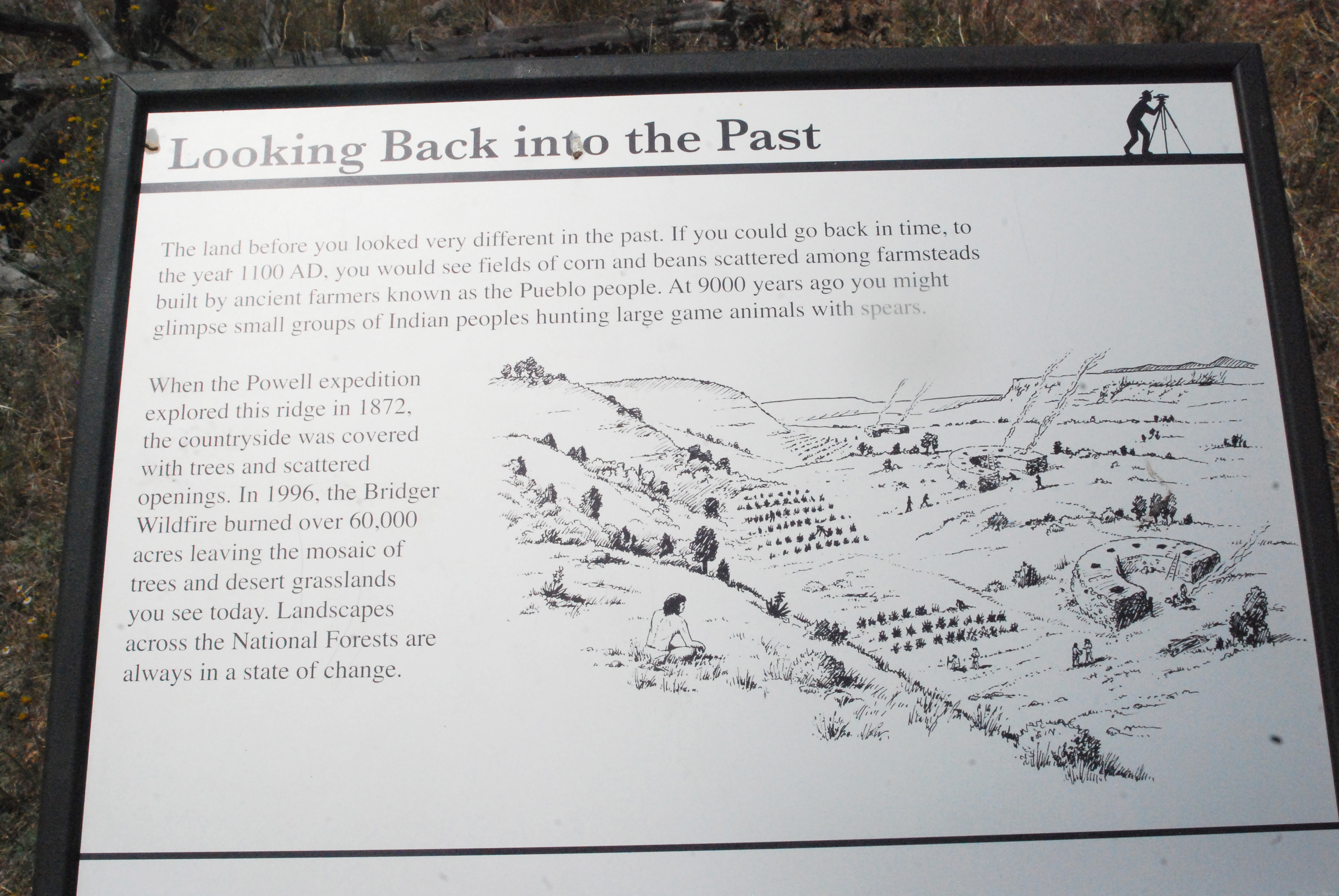
"Looking back into the past"

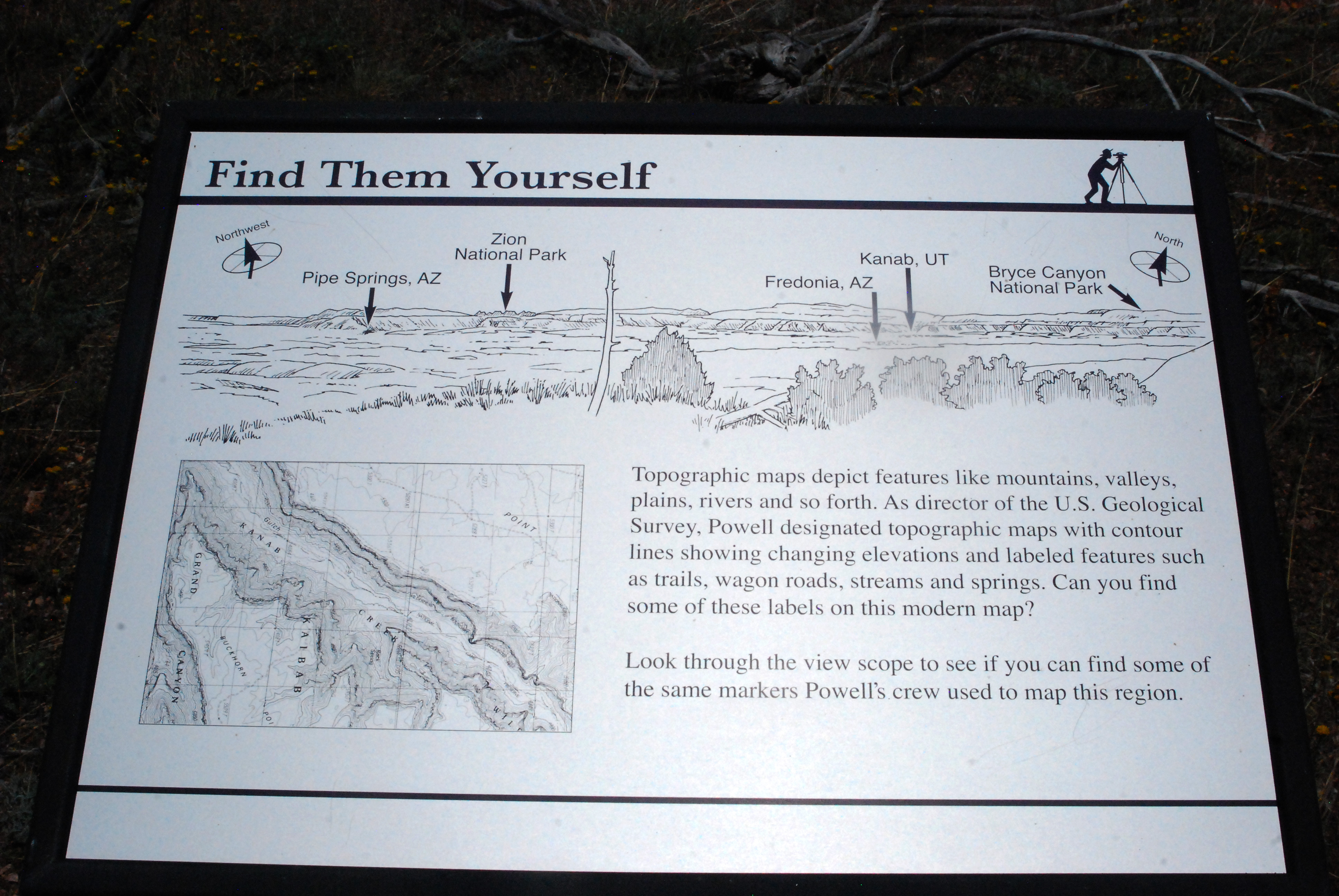
"Find them yourself"

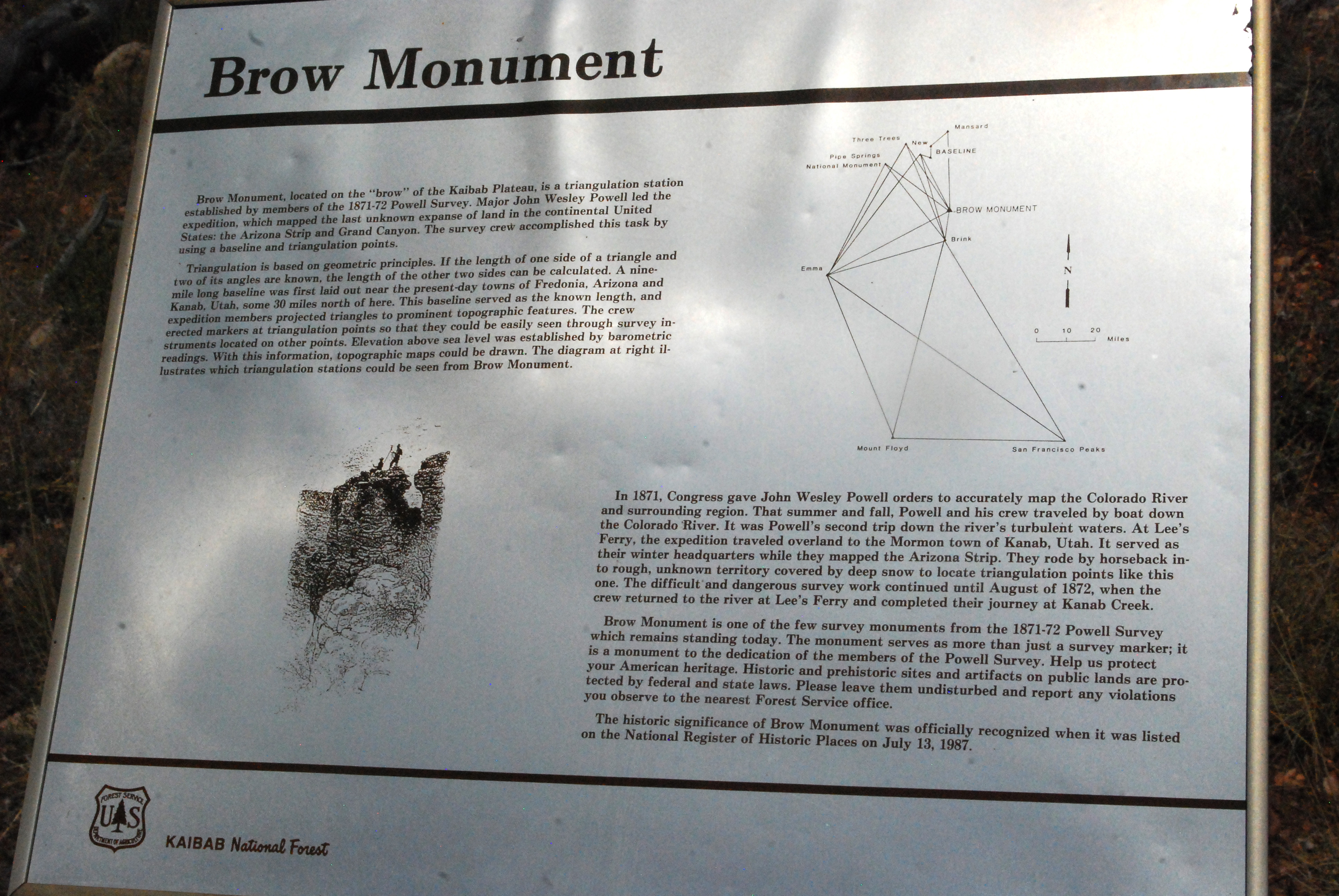
"Brow Monument"

== See also ==
- National Register of Historic Places listings in Coconino County, Arizona
