= Cypress dome =

Swamp dominated by pond or bald cypress

A cypress dome is a type of freshwater forested wetland, or a swamp, found in the southeastern part of the United States. They are dominated by the Taxodium spp., either the bald cypress (Taxodium distichum), or pond cypress (Taxodium ascendens). The name comes from the dome-like shape of treetops, formed by smaller trees growing on the edge where the water is shallow while taller trees grow at the center in deeper water. They usually appear as circular, but if the center is too deep, they form a “doughnut” shape when viewed from above. Cypress domes are characteristically small compared to other swamps, however they can occur at a range of sizes, dependent on the depth.

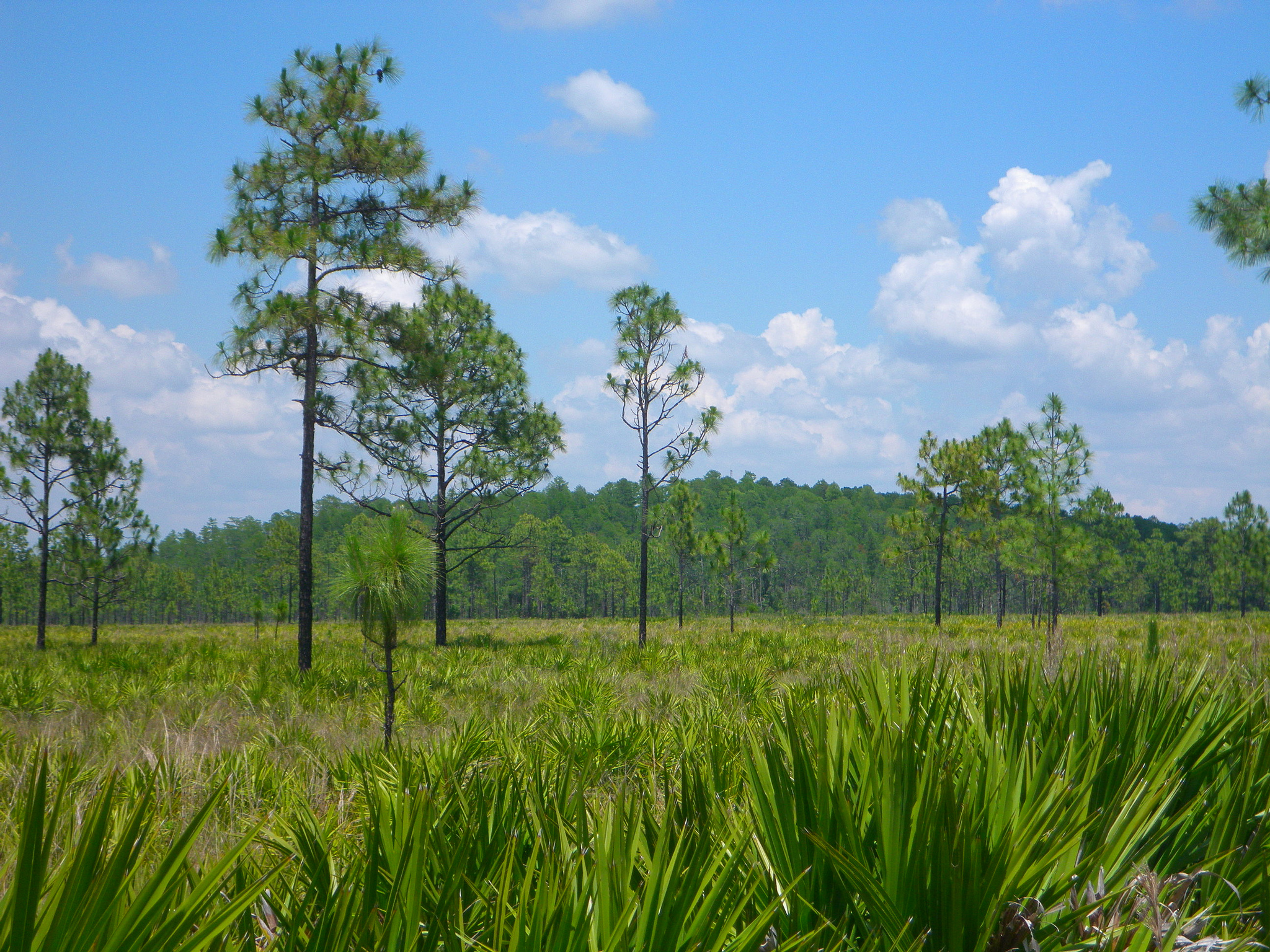
A cypress dome in the background

Cypress domes form when pond cypress grow in shallow standing water. The ground level in the center of the dome may be several inches to a few feet lower than at the edge of the dome, but tree growth is more vigorous at the center of the dome. Thus, the treetops are higher at the center than at the edge of the dome.

== Range ==
Cypress domes are found in the southeastern region of the United States. They form in flatland depressions in the Gulf Coastal Plain and southern Atlantic Plain, in the states of Georgia, Florida, Alabama, Mississippi, and Louisiana. Southern coastal plain nonriverine cypress domes are found throughout the southern coastal plains.

Cypress domes are the most common swamp habitat in Florida. Most abundant in Central Florida, they also occur in other areas of Florida north of the Florida Keys. South Florida cypress domes are found in southern Florida, in particular in and around the Everglades and the Big Cypress National Preserve. They are distinguished from southern coastal plain cypress domes by the presence of tropical understory species.

== Hydrology ==
The water levels of dome swamps are naturally fluctuating and dependent on seasonal rainfall. Dome swamps derive most of their water through runoff from surrounding uplands. They also may be influenced by groundwater when they are directly connected to the aquifer. Groundwater particularly impacts the hydrology during periods of drought. Dome swamps can recharge the aquifers, acting as reservoirs. The average hydroperiod for a dome swamp is approximately 180 to 270 days per year. The water is deepest and remains the longest in the center of the dome. Prolonged dry and wet periods have a huge effect on cypress regeneration. Adult cypress trees are tolerant to extended periods of inundation, however their seeds cannot germinate under water and may not survive.

== Fire dependency ==
Cypress swamps occur in fire-maintained communities. Fire is essential for maintaining the structure and species composition in these communities. Without periodic fires, cypress may become less dominant. Cypress are tolerant to light surface fires, due to their thick, fire-resistant bark. Surface fires act as a mechanism to remove potential competitors without tolerance and resilience to fires. However, catastrophic fires that burn into the peat can be detrimental to cypress trees, especially when there has been a long period with no fires. Catastrophic wildfires can alter the ground surface and transform a dome swamp into other types of wetlands, such as a wet prairie or shrub bog. Fire frequency is greatest along the edge of the dome and least moving inwards. Along the edge, the normal fire period may be three to five years, whereas the center may be as long as 100 to 150 years. Due to cypress domes having a more variable hydroperiod, cypress domes tend to have more natural fires than larger cypress forests. Fire patterns impact the quality of ecological services provided by cypress domes, for example carbon storage and hydrologic storage.

== List of species ==
=== Flora ===
Plant species that occur in cypress domes include:

Herbaceous species

- toothed midsorus fern (Telmatoblechnum serrulatum)
- false nettle (Boehmeria cylindrica)
- sawgrass (Cladium jamaicense)
- Carolina redroot (Lachnanthes caroliniana)
- taperleaf waterhorehound (Lycopus rubellus)
- maidencane (Panicum hemitomon)
- knotweeds (Polygonum spp.)
- beaksedge (Rhynchospora spp.)
- lizard's tail (Saururus cernuus)
- cinnamon fern (Osmunda cinnamomea)
- royal fern (Osmunda regalis var. spectabilis)
- Virginia chain fern (Woodwardia virginica)

Miscellaneous species

- duckweeds (Lemna, Spirodela, and Landoltia)
- big floatingheart (Nymphoides aquatica)
- orchids (Orchidaceae spp.)
- bulltongue arrowhead (Sagittaria lancifolia)
- floating water spangles (Salvinia minima)
- sphagnum moss (Sphagnum spp.)
- alligatorflag (Thalia geniculata)
- wild pine (Tillandsia spp.)

Shrubs (uncommon)

- common buttonbush (Cephalanthus occidentalis)
- titi (Cyrilla racemiflora)
- St. John's wort (Hypericum spp.)
- Virginia willow (Itea virginica)
- fetterbush (Lyonia lucida)
- wax myrtle (Myrica cerifera)
- coastalplain willow (Salix caroliniana)

Trees

- red maple (Acer rubrum)
- pond apple (Annona glabra, South Florida)
- river birch (Betula nigra)
- Atlantic white cedar (Chamaecyparis thyoides)
- Coco plum (Chrysobalanus icaco, South Florida)
- loblolly bay (Gordonia lasianthus)
- dahoon (Ilex cassine)
- sweetbay (Magnolia virginiana)
- swamp bay (Persea palustris)
- slash pine (Pinus elliottii)
- loblolly pine (Pinus taeda)
- pond pine (Pinus serotina)
- water tupelo (Nyssa aquatica)
- black gum (Nyssa sylvatica)
- water hickory (Carya aquatica)
- Carolina ash (Fraxinus caroliniana)
- Carolina cherry laurel (Prunus caroliniana)
- American elm (Ulmus americana)
- water locust (Gleditsia aquatica)
- swamp chestnut oak (Quercus michauxii)
- water oak (Quercus nigra)
- willow oak (Quercus phellos)
- white fringetree (Cionanthus virginicus)
- pygmy fringetree (Cionanthus pygmeus)
- American holly (Ilex opaca)
- inkberry holly (Ilex glabra)
- cabbage palm (Sabal palmetto)
- dwarf palmetto (Sabal minor)
- saw palmetto (Serenoa repens)
- bald cypress (Taxodium distichum)
- pond cypress (Taxodium ascendens)
- needle palm (Rhapidophyllum hystrix)

Vines

- white twinevine (Sarcostemma clausum)
- laurel greenbrier (Smilax laurifolia)
- Spanish moss (Tillandsia usneoides)
- poison ivy (Toxicodendron radicans)

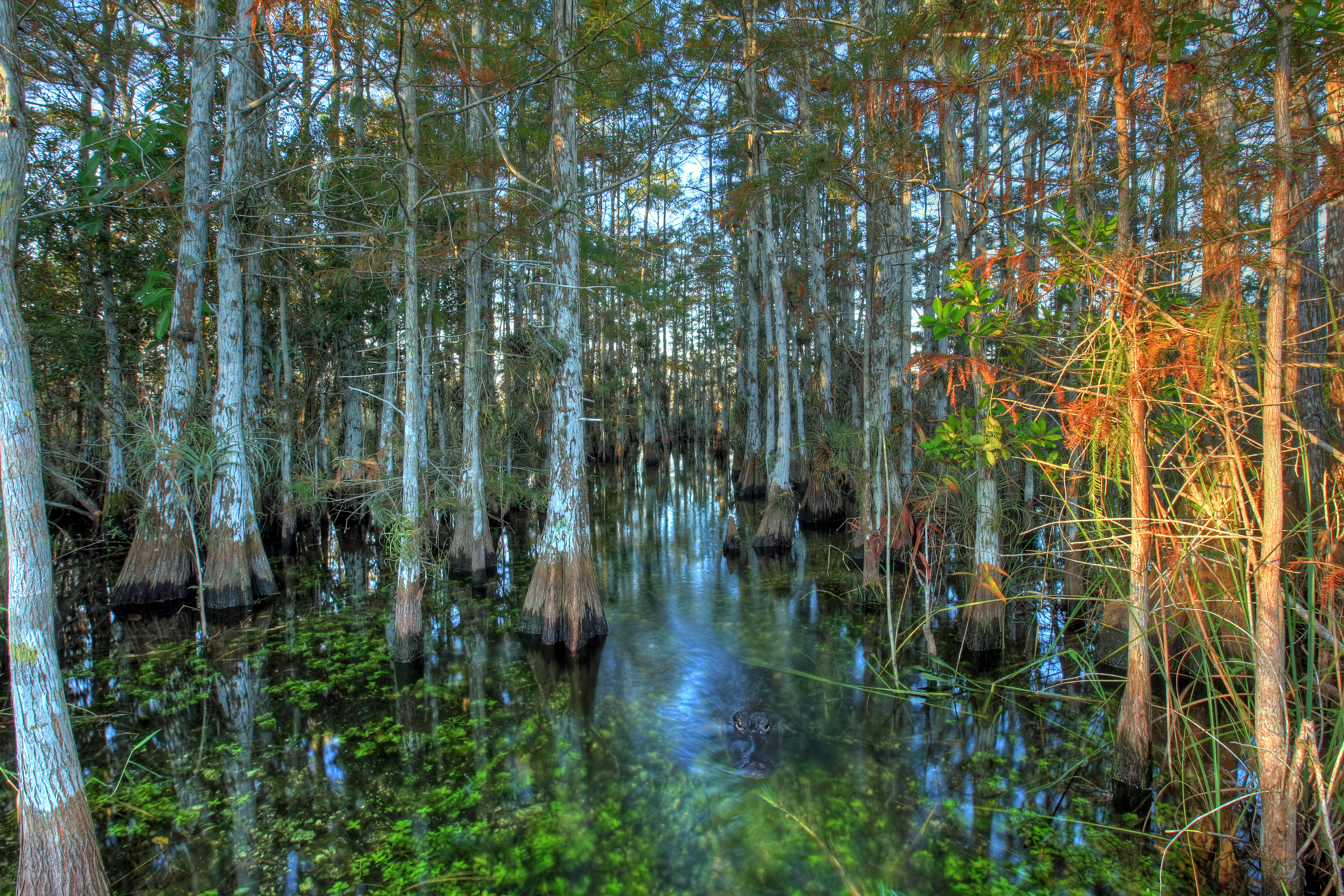
Cypress dome with alligator - G.Gardner

=== Fauna ===
Dome swamps provide breeding habitat for rare animals such as flatwoods salamanders (Ambystoma spp.), white ibis (Eudocimus albus), and wood storks (Mycteria americana). Other species include:

- Cottonmouth (Agkistrodon piscivorus)
- American alligator (Alligator mississippiensis)
- Florida sandhill crane (Antigone canadensis pratensis)
- Carolina gopher frog (Lithobates capito)
- Striped newt (Notophthalmus perstriatus)
- Ornate chorus frog (Pseudacris ornata)
- Florida panther (Puma concolor coryi)
- Similar cebrionid beetle (Selonodon similis)
- Florida black bear (Ursus americanus floridanus)

== Threats ==
The major threat to cypress swamps are humans. Anthropogenic alterations have negative impacts including hydrological modifications, logging, increased nutrients, pollution from agricultural runoff, and invasion of exotic species. Conversion of surrounding lands to urban development, pastures, and agriculture can impede natural fires and changes the hydrology. Changing the hydroperiods of cypress domes may limit reproduction of natural species and increase likelihood of invasive species. Invasive species threaten native species through competition for light, nutrients, and space.

Dome swamps have been used as a timber resource since the late 19th century. The rapid harvesting of cypress trees has made it difficult for them to regenerate and made them especially vulnerable.

In addition, dome swamps are used as areas to treat wastewater. This can cause increased nutrients, organic matter, and minerals to enter the swamp. This can increase aquatic plants, decrease oxygen in the water, and cause declines in native populations. Dome swamps treated with sewage may have higher water levels and litter production.

== See also ==
- Cypress knee – Distinctive structure forming above the roots of a cypress tree
- Strand (swamp) – Forested wetland habitat in Florida
