= Gumbo Limbo Environmental Complex =

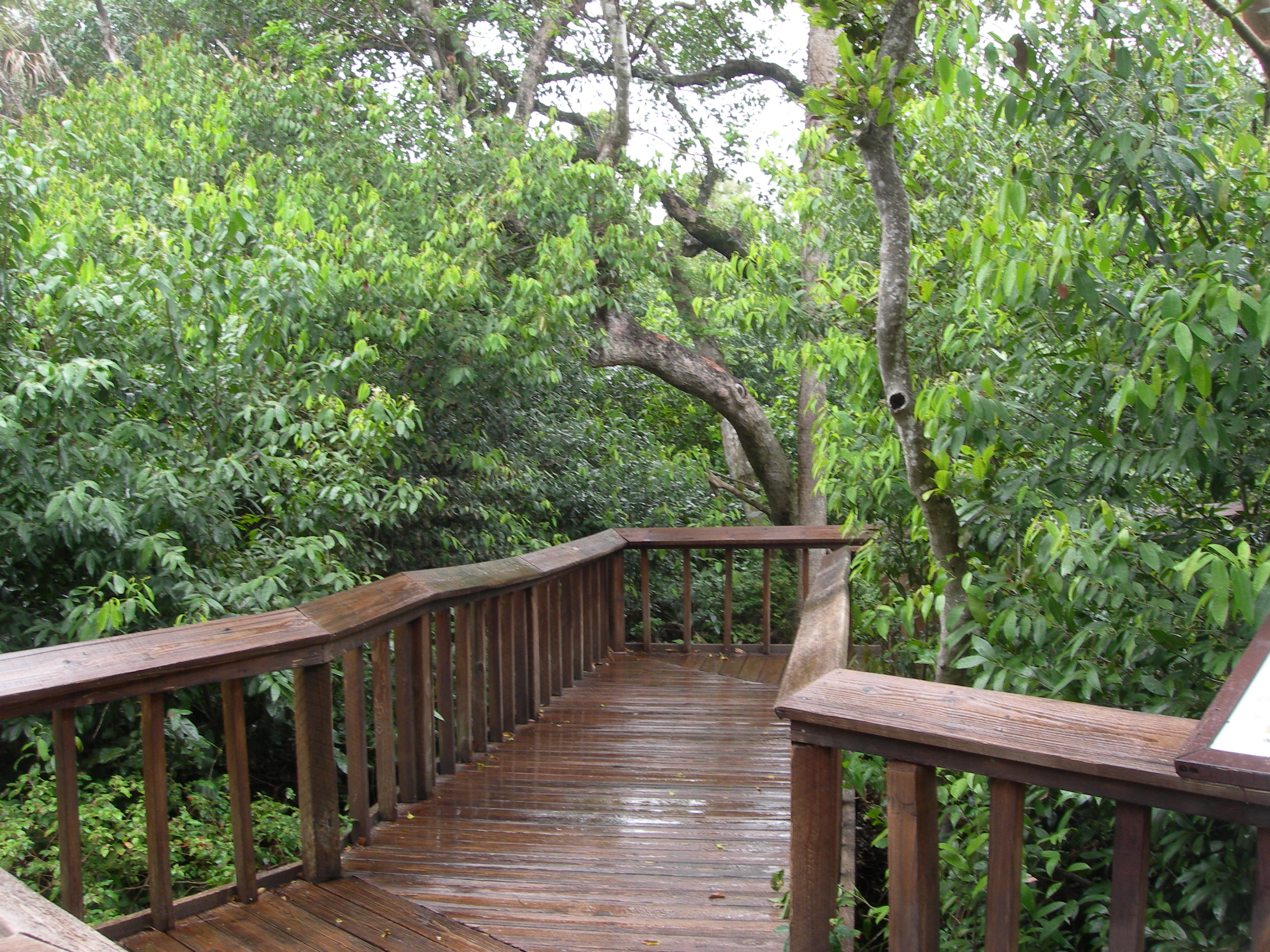
- Trail through the hammock
- Established: 1984
- Location: Red Reef Park; 1801 N. Ocean Blvd. Boca Raton, Florida
- Coordinates: 26.366336°N 80.070434°W
- Type: Nature center
- Website: Official Website

The Gumbo Limbo Environmental Complex, commonly known as the Gumbo Limbo Nature Center, is a nature center operated by the city of Boca Raton, Florida, in conjunction with the Gumbo Limbo Coastal Stewards (Gumbo Limbo Nature Center, Inc.) and the Greater Boca Raton Beach and Park District, and located at 1801 N. Ocean Blvd. in Boca Raton. Gumbo Limbo sits on twenty acres of protected barrier island, the area between the Intracoastal Waterway and the Atlantic Ocean. It is on land which is part of the beachfront-to-intracoastal Red Reef Park, though Gumbo Limbo does not have land directly on the beach (though it does have Intracoastal Waterway frontage). Its name comes from a popular name of the Bursera simaruba tree species, which is abundant in the park.

The center includes an indoor museum with exhibits, small aquariums, and a gift shop, plus more major outdoor facilities including several large aquariums featuring ecosystems for fish, turtles, and other sea life, a boardwalk trail through the adjacent woods, and a garden designed for observing butterflies. Events organized by the center include observations of sea turtles during their nesting season. Volunteers from the local community significantly assist in the operation of this center and its events.

== History ==
The site was first described in 1870, when it was known as Boca Raton Hammock. Its northern terminus was bounded by coastal strand, a "flat" that bore clumps of sea oats, cocoplum, and sea grape. Behind the strand an overgrown crest or "ridge" paralleled the coast, its primary element being saw palmetto. Both hammock and ridge were bordered on the west by a freshwater marsh. Joining Lake Boca Raton and Lake Worth, the sawgrass marsh was marked by numerous meanders. It was known as the "Spanish River" sometime after 1895, when the Florida East Coast Railway arrived and the Intracoastal Waterway was dredged. During the Florida land boom of the 1920s the Boca Raton Inlet, formerly unnavigable, was opened, resulting in saltwater intrusion. At this time the Hillsboro Canal was completed as well, draining the Everglades. As a result, mangroves displaced freshwater vegetative cover by the 1940s, but vestiges of the former wetlands persisted into the 1970s and beyond, including the freshwater plant Annona glabra, a species still found at Gumbo Limbo.

== Sea turtle conservation and rehabilitation ==
Gumbo Limbo is best known for its involvement with protecting the area's sea turtles. The beaches of South Florida serve as a nesting habitat for the loggerhead, green, and leatherback sea turtles. Unfortunately, every species of sea turtle alive today is either classified as a threatened or endangered species. Gumbo Limbo works together with the Florida Fish and Wildlife Conservation Commission to protect the area's sea turtles. Since the 1980s, the Boca Raton Sea Turtle Conservation and Research Program at Gumbo Limbo Nature Center has a Marine Conservationist and Marine Turtle Specialists that monitor, record, and study the sea turtle activity on the five miles of Boca Raton's city beach. This group also deals with reports of dead or injured turtles from the Boynton Beach Inlet to the Boca Raton/Deerfield Beach border.

For over three decades, Gumbo Limbo's sea turtle conservation team has come to the aid of sick and injured sea turtles in the Boca Raton area. In 2010 through the joint efforts of the City and Friend of Gumbo Limbo, Gumbo Limbo opened up a rehabilitation facility to treat the wounded turtles on campus. The goal of the rehabilitation program is to treat the turtles until they are able to survive in the wild. The rehabilitation center is one of only six Florida sea turtle rehabilitation centers to accept turtles with Fibropapillomatosis. Fibropapillomatosis (FP) is related to strains of the herpes virus. There is a correlation between warm polluted waters and cases of FP. A majority of Gumbo Limbo's turtles with FP come from lagoons and bays close to densely populated areas. The runoff into the water is filled with fertilizers, pesticides, pet waste, and other pollutants resulting in very poor water quality. FP usually manifests itself as benign tumors resembling cauliflower. Tumors located on the flippers can impede with the turtle's ability to swim, and tumors on the eyes and mouth can impact the ability to find and eat food. The tumors are removed surgically at Gumbo Limbo.

== Research facility ==
The Gumbo Limbo Environmental Complex is also home to a research facility for Florida Atlantic University's Department of Biological Sciences. Research has focused on sea turtle behavior, shark sensory perception and effects of salt levels on seagrasses. Visitors are able to view the facility and chat with the researchers.

== Sources ==
- Austin, Daniel F.; Coleman-Marois, Katherine; Richardson, Donald R. (Fall 1977). "Vegetation of southeast Florida—II–V". Florida Scientist. 40 (4). Florida Academy of Sciences, Inc.: 331–361. JSTOR 24320068.
  - — (March 1978). "Spanish River". Broward Legacy. 2 (1–2). Broward County Historical Commission: 2–5.
- Pierce, Charles W. (1970). Churl, Donald W. (ed.). Pioneer Life in Southeast Florida. Miami: University of Miami Press. ISBN 0-87024-163-X.
