= Spanish River (Florida) =

Former fresh-water stream in Florida

Coordinates: 27.53810°N 80.38948°W

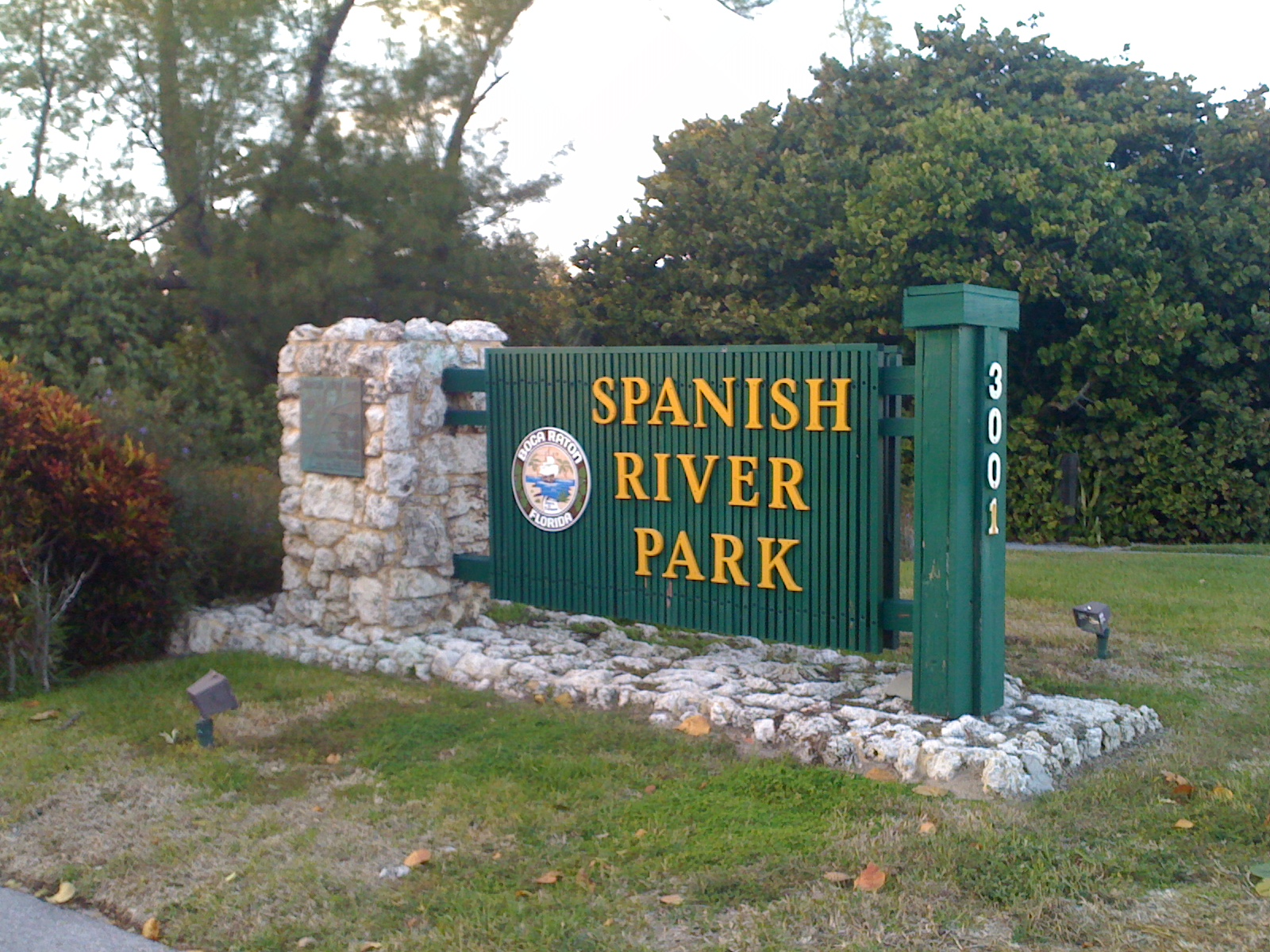
Sign containing the name

The Spanish River is a former fresh-water stream which once flowed through Boca Raton, Florida. It was originally known, erroneously, as "Boca Raton's Lagoon" or "Lake Boca Ratones", a name first used in 1823—Boca de Ratones apparently having been originally appended to an inlet near Biscayne Bay—and later as the "Little Hillsboro", but settlers, supposing it to have been discovered by Spanish colonists, renamed it the "Old Spanish River"; the last dates to 1895 or later, when the stream was progressively canalized and eventually turned into the Intracoastal Waterway. By 1945 the original contours of the stream effectively vanished, save for remnants. (Note: One theory holds that Spaniards founded a colony near the headwaters of the stream, remnants of which included a sour orange grove dateable to British rule, a landmark first noted during the Seminole Wars.)

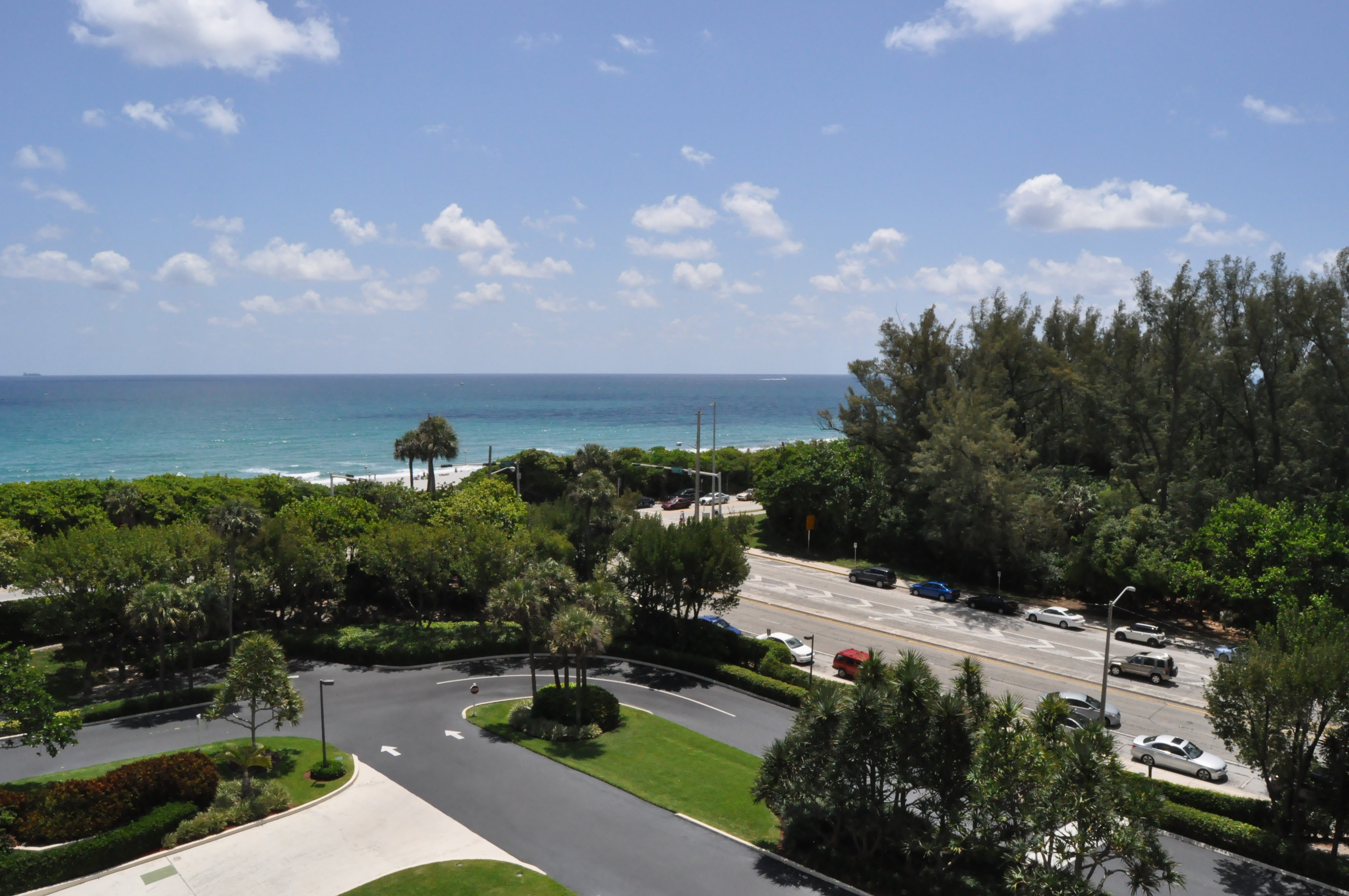
Junction of Spanish River Boulevard and State Road A1A

Before then, the stream, which ran latitudinally between Lake Boca Raton and Lake Worth, consisted of sawgrass marsh. Below Lake Worth its first 6 mi (9.7 km) were nearly impassable, but the stream widened beyond Orange Grove Haulover, at which point it was just 7 ft (2.1 m) across. Just 2 mi (3.2 km) past it broadened to 50 ft (15 m) and later to 100 ft (30 m) as it snaked south. The stream ran past the Boca Raton Hammock through present-day Lake Wyman and Lake Rogers, emptying into Lake Boca Raton. Mangroves spottily fringed the stream near the Boca Raton Inlet—then unnavigable—where periodic overwash temporarily formed a brackish environment after storms. In the 1870s most of the stream was dense wetland, 1 to 2 mi (1.6 to 3.2 km) across, being filled with water lily and arrowhead. Wildlife was abundant in the stream, including American alligators, herons, grackles, and red-winged blackbirds. A freshwater spring was present in the stream near the inlet.

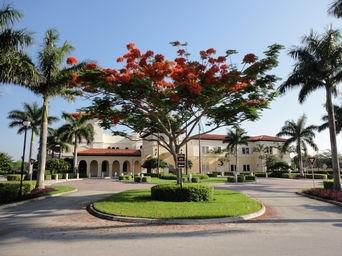
Spanish River Library

In the late 19th century the barefoot mailman walked past the stream and stopped by to drink freshwater. In the 1890s the Florida East Coast Railway opened the area of the stream to development. By 1908 the Yamato Colony farmed the banks of the stream, sending crops to market, and lent the name Jap Rock to a landform near its headwaters. Around the same time coconuts were cultivated and a fishing camp established by the stream. During the Florida land boom of the 1920s, the draining of the Everglades opened the Hillsboro Canal; this, along the dredging of Boca Raton Inlet, led to saltwater intrusion, and consequently mangroves supplanted freshwater vegetation in the "river". Urbanization also reduced surface runoff. Cumulatively these impacts led to a large drop, perhaps more than 6 ft (1.8 m), in the freshwater table, forcing farmlands to migrate landward. By the 1940s mangrove swamps flanked the "Spanish River", having replaced the onetime sawgrass marsh, but bits of freshwater wetland lingered into the 1970s.

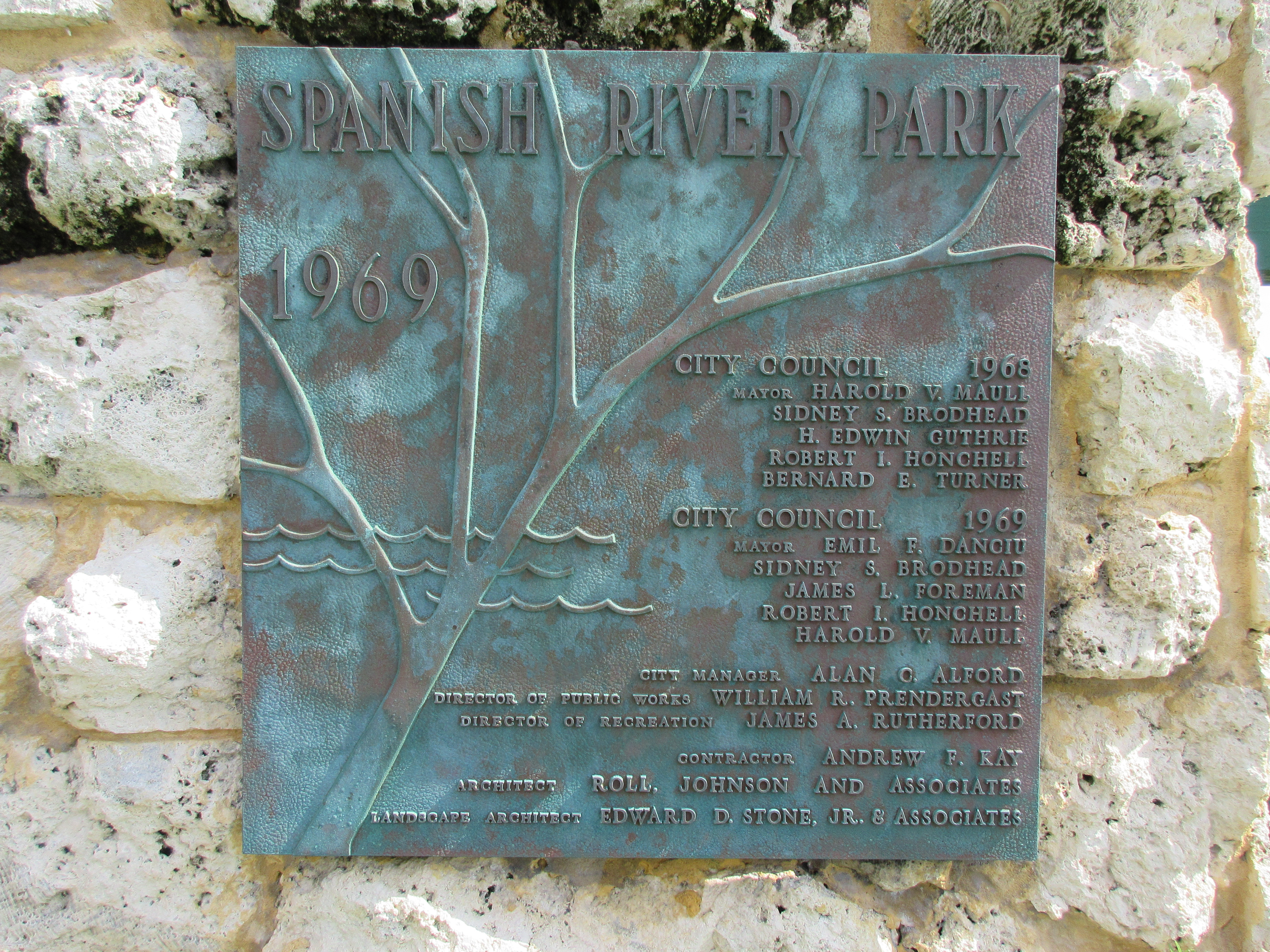
Plaque at Spanish River Park

People joke that "no one in town can find it" but in fact the stream bed is still visible in Spanish River Park, on the barrier island alongside State Road A1A; relics of the stream were also once detectable near its headwaters, west of Jap Rock (now Highland Beach), and other vestiges are still evident at Gumbo Limbo Environmental Complex—formerly Boca Raton Hammock—such as the persistence of pond apples. (Note: While salt-tolerant, in South Florida Annona glabra is a freshwater species.) There are several other establishments in the area that bear the name of the once-flowing stream, including a high school, a church, a library, and a road.
