= Water ash =

Water ash is a common name for several plants and may refer to:

- Acer negundo
- Fraxinus caroliniana
