= Royal Palm Beach Pines Natural Area =

Protected Land

Coordinates: 26.7312°N 80.24913°W

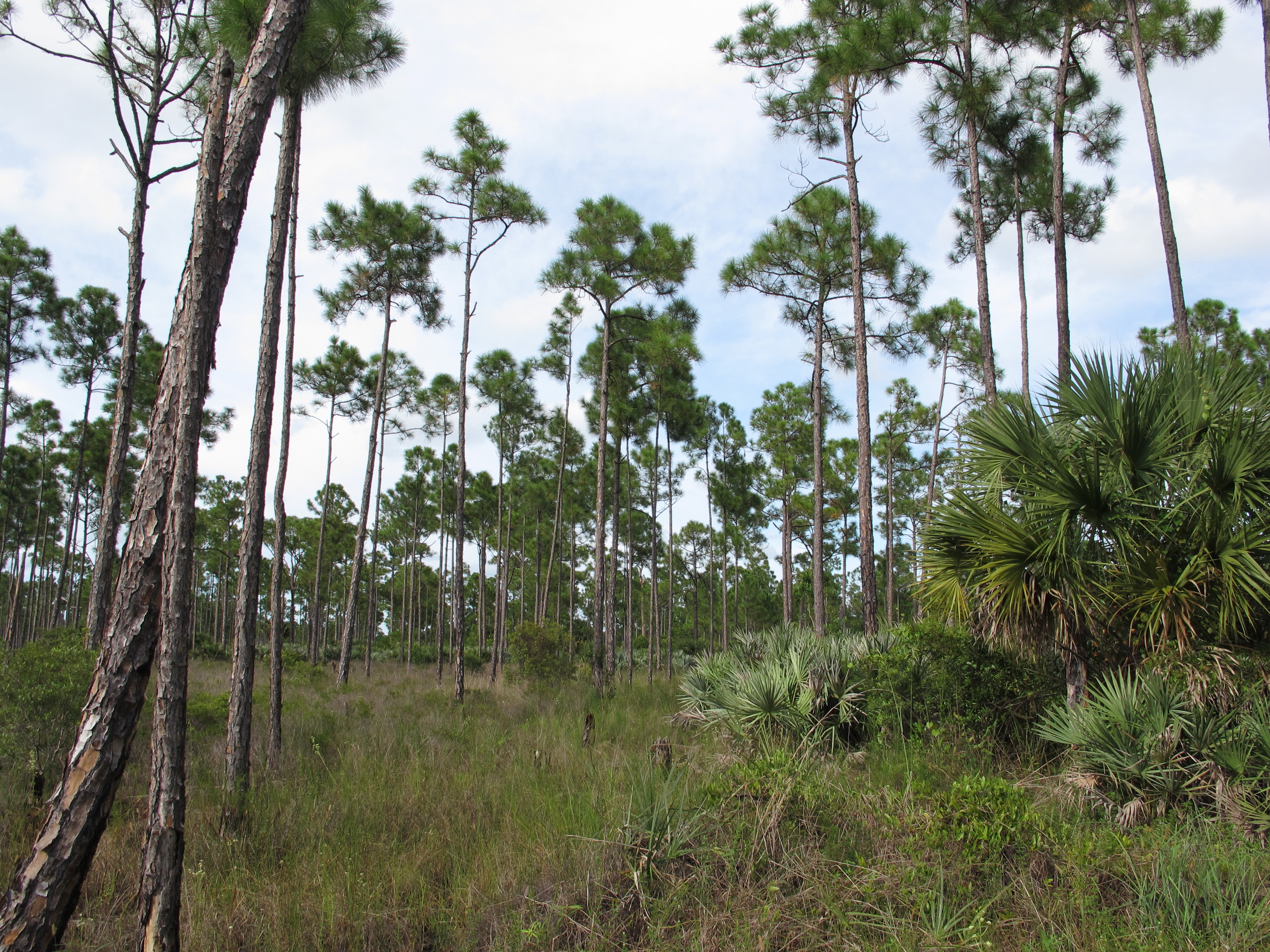
South Florida pine flatwoods in the natural area

Royal Palm Beach Pines Natural Area is a 773-acre area of protected land in Royal Palm Beach, Florida, that includes South Florida pine flatwoods, wet prairies, hydric hammocks, depression marshes, and South Florida cypress domes. Common species include bald eagles, red-shouldered hawks, sandhill cranes, bobcats, Southern cricket frogs, and Eastern box turtles. There are hiking and equestrian trails, a nature trail, and boardwalk. The park is located at 110 Nature's Way or the northern entrance on 40th Street and Avocado Boulevard.
