= South Florida cypress dome =

Plant community of Florida, US

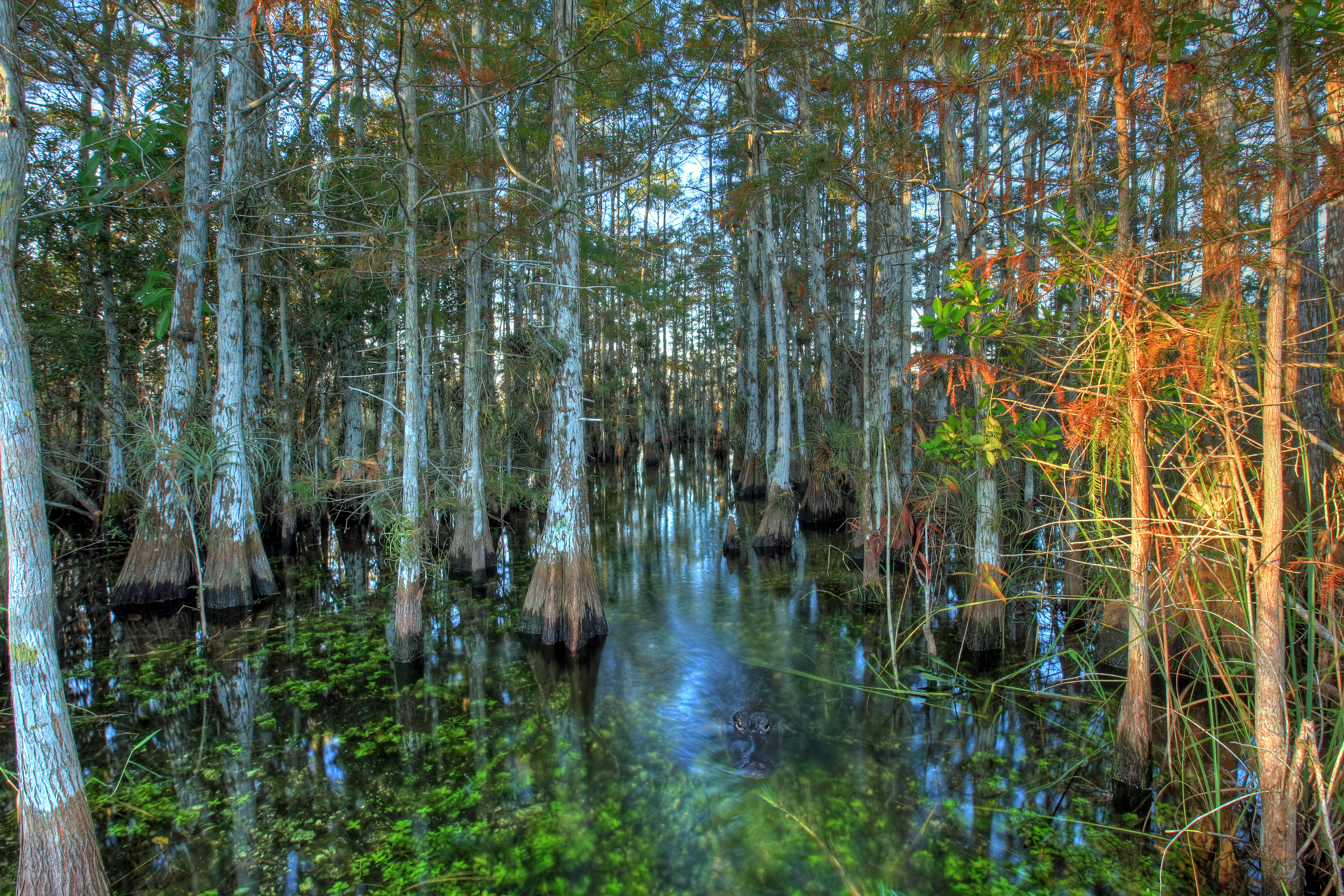
Cypress dome in Everglades National Park

The South Florida cypress dome is a forested wetland plant community found in southern Florida, mostly in and around the Everglades and the Big Cypress National Preserve. They form in shallow depressions whose impervious substrates hold standing water for several months of the year.

Although the center of the depression is its deepest part, it is also where trees are the tallest and oldest. This gives these swamps a dome-like appearance and also their name. The stagnant water in the depressions is highly acidic.

Pond cypress (Taxodium ascendens) is the most common tree in cypress domes. It is joined by the subtropical shrubs pond-apple (Annona glabra), cocoplum (Chrysobalanus icaco), and swamp bay (Persea palustris). Herbaceous plants include giant red bacopa (Bacopa caroliniana). The strangler fig (Ficus aurea) and the ghost orchid (Dendrophylax lindenii) are also found here.

It is distinguished from the similar southern coastal plain nonriverine cypress dome by the presence of tropical understory species.

== See also ==
- Cypress dome
