= Hillsboro Canal =

Canal in Florida, United States

Coordinates: 26.327869°N 80.107451°W

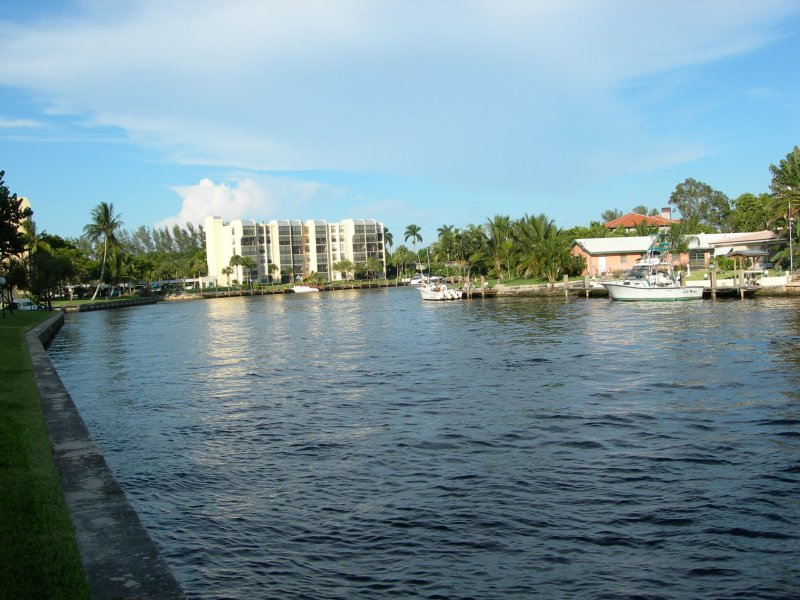
Hillsboro Canal at Boca Raton

The Hillsboro Canal, also known as the Hillsboro River, is located in the southeastern portion of Florida within the South Florida Water Management District, and for much of its length forms the border between Broward and Palm Beach counties; however, its western end was entirely in Palm Beach County, until being recently annexed to Parkland in Broward County. It begins at Lake Okeechobee at the S-2 water control structure in South Bay west of Belle Glade, Florida.

It passes within the southern border of the Loxahatchee National Wildlife Refuge and flows southeast from there along Loxahatchee Road in a rural, lightly populated area. When it reaches the more heavily built-up region further east, it bends to head due eastward, forming the county line. Near its eastern end at the Intracoastal Waterway, with Boca Raton to the north and Deerfield Beach to the south, it departs from its straight course to go around several curves, but the county boundary continues to follow it at this point. 10 miles of the canal is navigable, and it is popular for recreational boating and fishing.

Restoration of the Everglades efforts include treatment to remove elevated levels of nutrients. As a part of this restoration effort, Hillsboro Canal flow was diverted at the Loxahatchee Refuge in 2001 to a wetland stormwater treatment area, STA-2, which discharges into Water Conservation Area 2.

== History ==
Before 1921 the Hillsboro River, one of several "deep streams" in present-day Broward County, was an outlet for sheet flow, allowing freshwater runoff to leave the eastern Everglades. The Hillsboro, like similar water bodies to its south, originated in a series of cypress swamps on the edge of the Everglades that drained eastward, cutting through the Atlantic Coastal Ridge, a mosaic of Florida scrub (ridgy "spruce pine") and South Florida pine flatwoods. Numerous sloughs, as well as depressions, defined the Hillsboro River basin. Starting in 1917, the Hillsboro River was canalized as part of Everglades draining. By 1921 the canal was complete; it proved almost too effective, economically ruining coastal truck farms, and led to saltwater intrusion. A rise in aridity and salt encroachment forced farmers inland, some as far as Lake Okeechobee.
