= South Florida pine flatwoods =

Ecological region in Florida, US

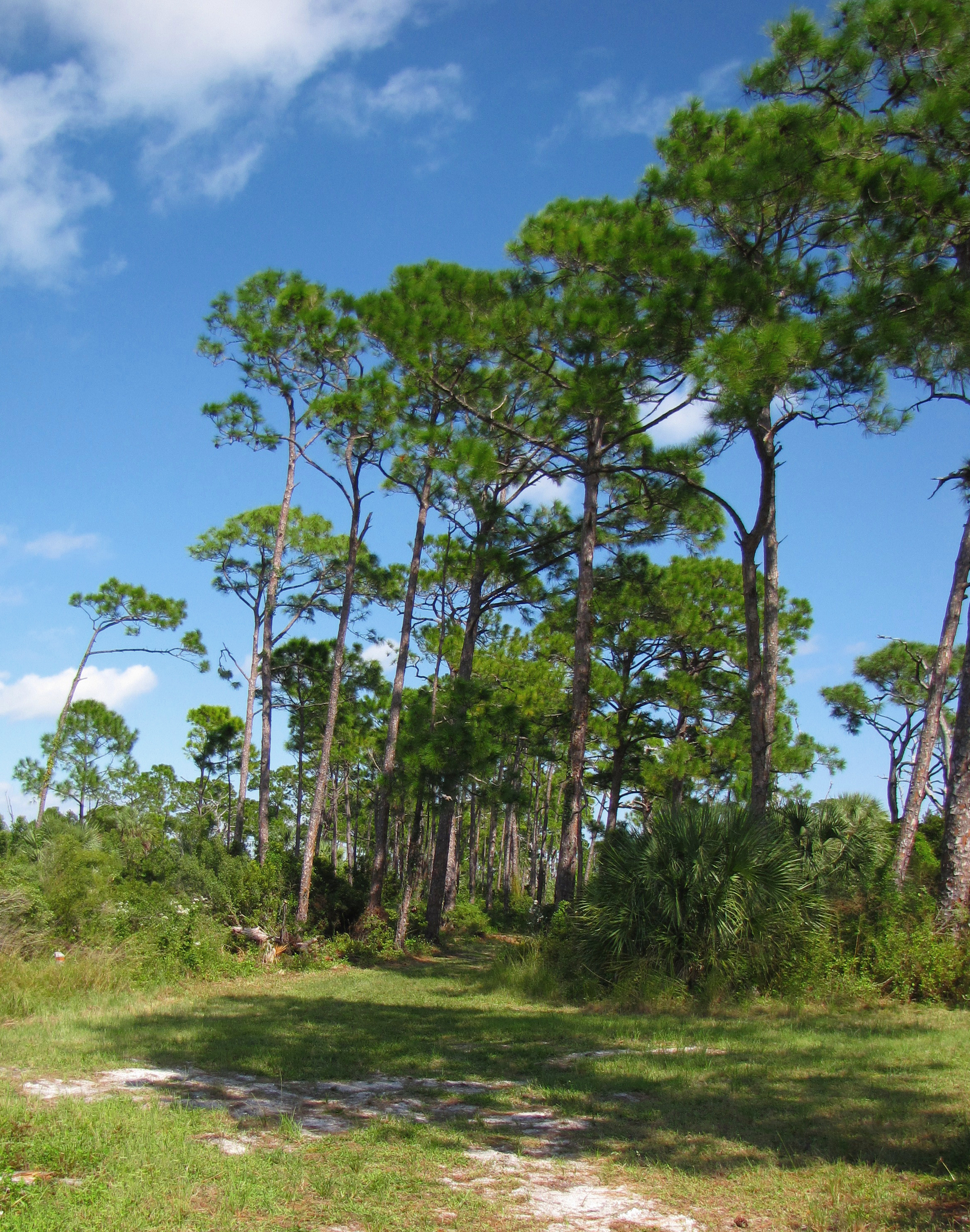
South Florida pine flatwoods at Honeymoon Island State Park

The south Florida pine flatwoods are a flatwoods forest community found in central and southern Florida, ending north of Orlando. They are dominant from just north of Lake Okeechobee southward, sharing affinity with similar communities in the Caribbean. Their understory is partly herbaceous. As rainfall varies seasonally, they sport high plant biodiversity.

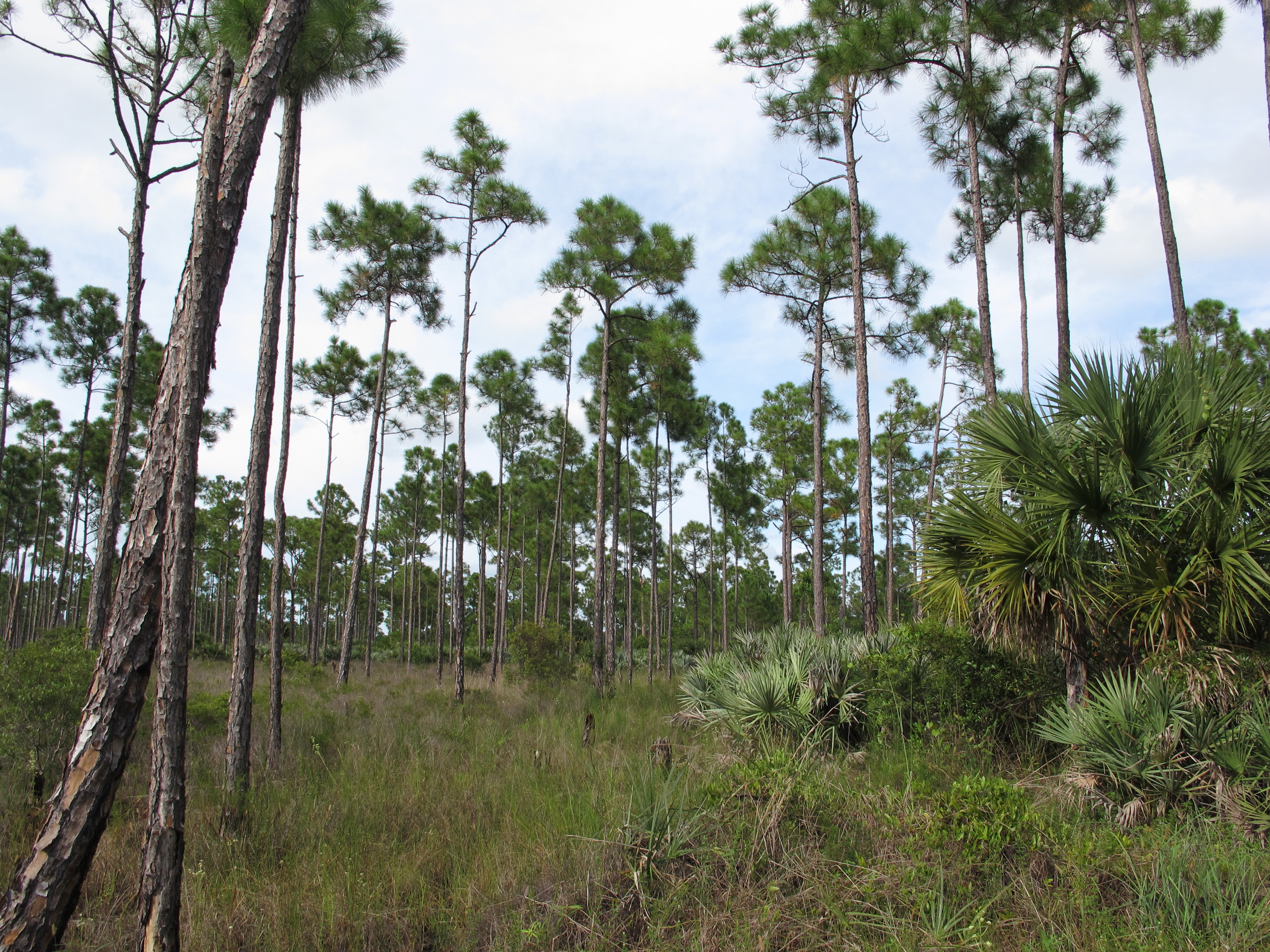
South Florida pine flatwoods at Royal Palm Beach Pines Natural Area, Palm Beach County

Appearing savanna-like, these flatwoods have open canopies of slash pine (Pinus elliottii var. densa) above a dense understory of low shrubs and grasses in places where low-intensity fires are frequent. Where fires have been suppressed, slash pine, shrubs, and saw palmetto (Serenoa repens) become more dense.

In addition to saw palmetto, the shrubs Appalachian tea (Ilex glabra), coastal plain staggerbush (Lyonia fruticosa), dwarf live oak (Quercus minima), shiny blueberry (Vaccinium myrsinites), and rosy camphorweed (Pluchea rosea) can be found in the flatwoods. Wiregrass (Aristida beyrichiana) is the dominant grass.

This system is similar to Florida dry prairie, but has taller and denser shrub cover. Like other flatwoods, South Florida pine flatwoods are fire-dependent, but burn more frequently than typical flatwoods. They have been often used for rangeland. South Florida pine flatwoods are a mainstay of the Florida panther.
