= Southern coastal plain nonriverine cypress dome =

Ecological zone of southeastern US

The southern coastal plain nonriverine cypress dome is a forested wetland community found in the southern Atlantic coastal plain, in the states of Alabama, Florida, Georgia, Louisiana, and Mississippi.

They are small forested wetlands characterized by their dome-shaped appearance, with taller trees in the center and shorter trees around the perimeter. These wetlands occur on poorly drained depressions surrounded by pine flatwoods. The stagnant water in these wetlands is highly acidic. It is 1 to 4 feet (30 to 122 cm) deep in the center, becoming shallower at the margins.

Pond cypress (Taxodium ascendens) dominates the canopy, which it shares with swamp tupelo (Nyssa biflora) and sweetgum (Liquidambar styraciflua). Shrubs include myrtle holly (Ilex myrtifolia), dog hobble (Leucothoe racemosa), southern wax myrtle (Morella cerifera), buttonbush (Cephalanthus occidentalis), sweet pepperbush (Clethra alnifolia), fetterbush lyonia (Lyonia lucida), and snowbell (Styrax americanus).

== See also ==
- Cypress dome
