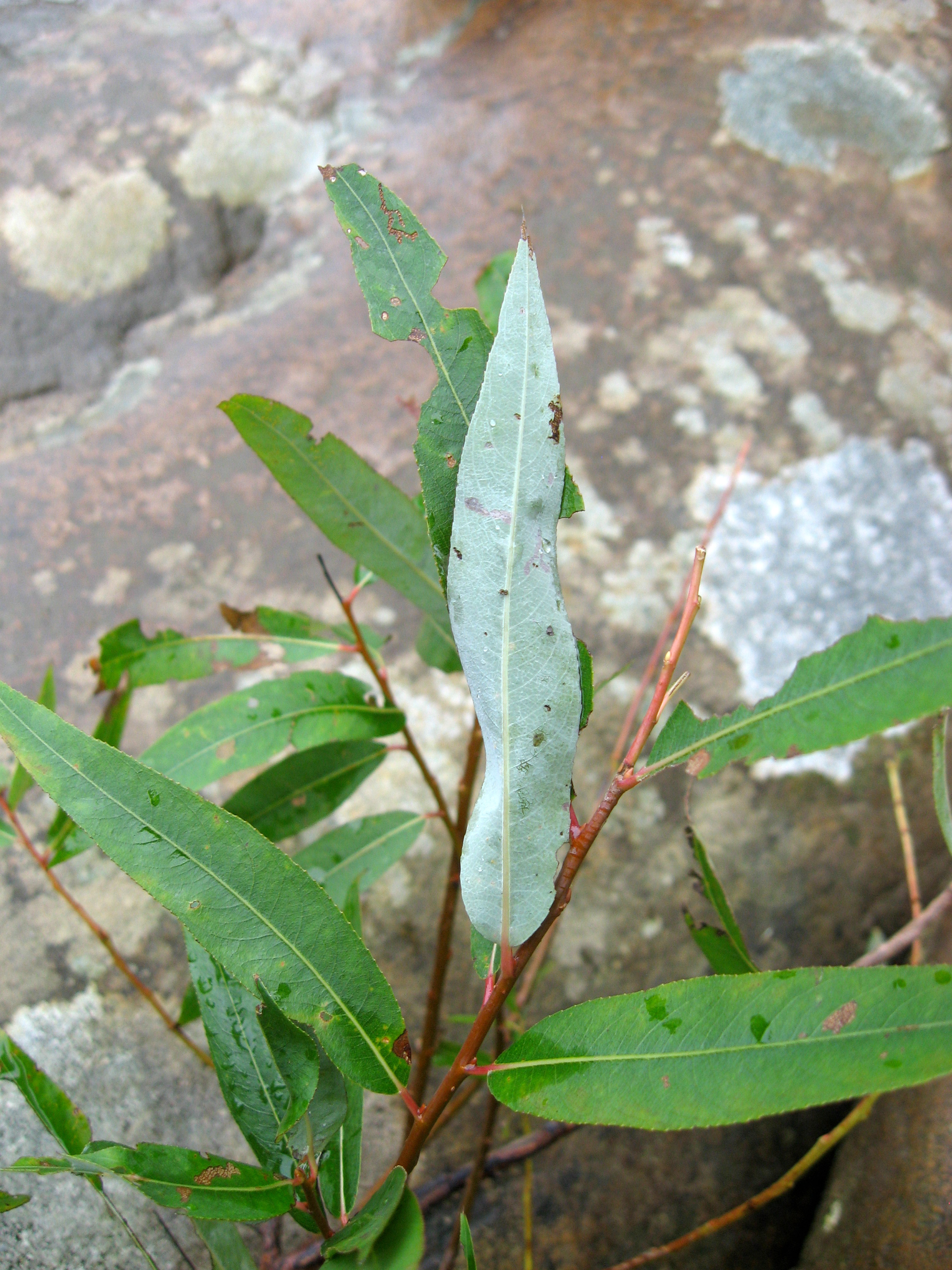

Conservation status
- Least Concern (IUCN 3.1)

Scientific classification
- Kingdom: Plantae
- Clade: Tracheophytes
- Clade: Angiosperms
- Clade: Eudicots
- Clade: Rosids
- Order: Malpighiales
- Family: Salicaceae
- Genus: Salix
- Species: S. caroliniana

Binomial name
- Salix caroliniana Michx.
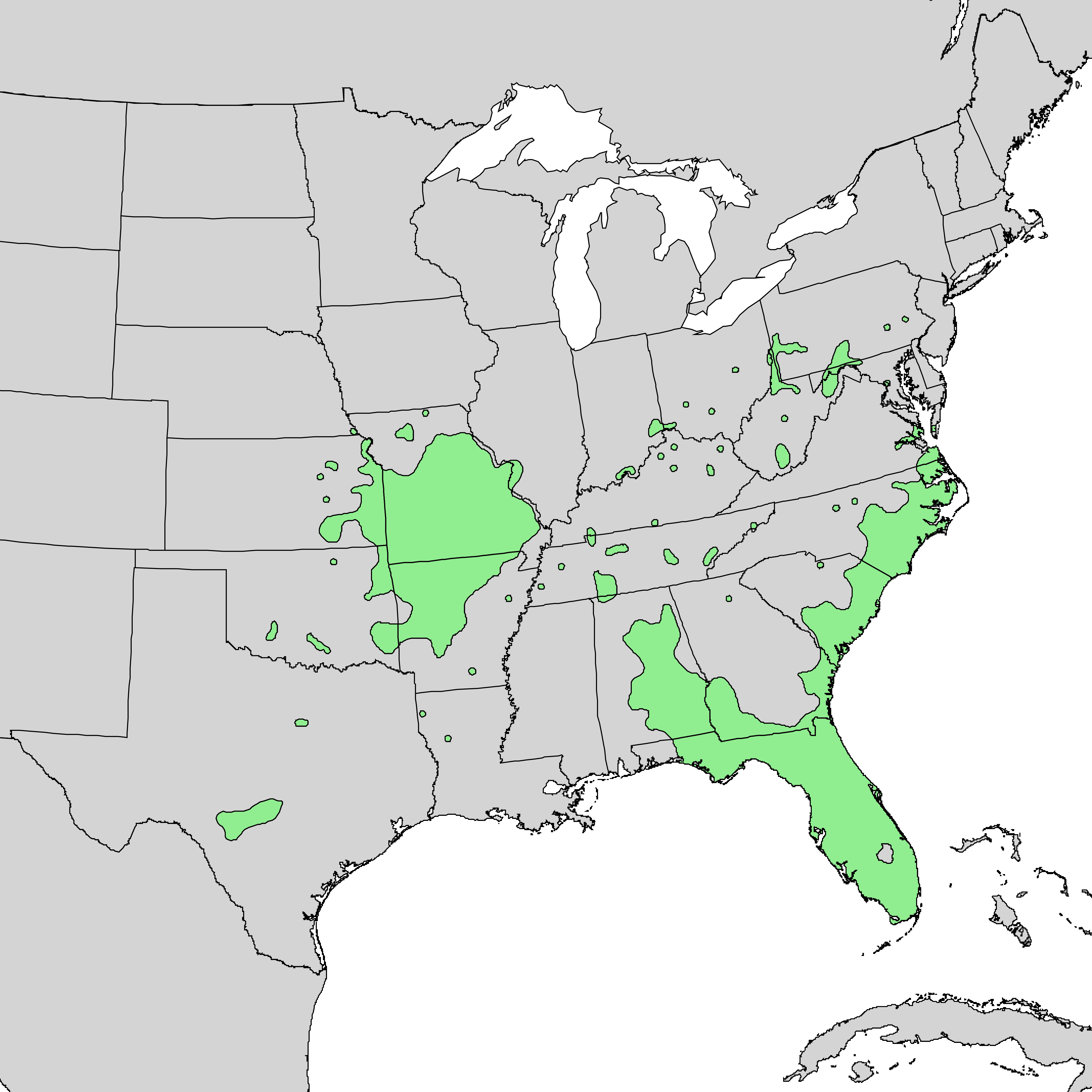
- Generalized natural range

= Salix caroliniana =

Species of shrub

Salix caroliniana, commonly known as the coastal plain willow, is a shrub or small tree native to the southeastern United States, Mexico and parts of Central America and the Caribbean. It is an obligate wetland species and grows as an emergent species in the Everglades. In the absence of fire, S. caroliniana can convert herbaceous wetlands to forested wetlands.

Salix caroliniana flowers in the early spring, either before or together with the emergence of leaves. In Alachua County, Florida in 1982, flowering was recorded during February and March.

The species was first described by French naturalist André Michaux in 1803 in his Flora Boreali-Americana.

The male flowers provide pring pollen for bees. It is a larval host to the black-waved flannel moth, the blinded sphinx, the cecropia moth, the elm sphinx, the imperial moth, the Io moth, the modest sphinx, the mourning cloak, the polyphemus moth, the promethea moth, the red-spotted purple, and the viceroy.

== Distribution and habitat ==
Salix caroliniana is distributed in the southeastern United States in North Carolina, South Carolina, Virginia, Georgia, Florida, Alabama, Mississippi, Louisiana, Texas, Tennessee, West Virginia, Pennsylvania, Maryland, Ohio, Illinois, and Indiana. Salix caroliniana is often found in wetland habitats like swamps, rivers, and marshes particularly in the coastal plain. Salix caroliniana has an important role in stabilizing soil in riparian areas and also provide habitat for many species of wildlife.

== Ethnobotany ==
Salix caroliniana is and was historically used by Native Americans for many things like basket weaving and structure building due to their ability to bend without breaking. The genus Salix is also known for symbolic traits in Native American culture, these include flexibility, resilience, and creativity.

Salix caroliniana is fed to exotic herbivores like Giraffa camelopardalis, Tragelaphus angasi, Tragelaphus eurycerus isaaci, Diceros bicornis minor, and Loxodonta africana africana at Disney's Animal Kingdom Theme Park. Salix caroliniana has a high dry matter content which contains protein, fiber, vitamins, and minerals.

== Conservation status ==
Salix caroliniana is critically imperiled in Pennsylvania, Mississippi, and Louisiana. Salix caroliniana is vulnerable in Ohio, Illinois, and Indiana. Salix caroliniana is apparently secure in North Carolina and West Virginia. Salix caroliniana is secure in Kentucky and Virginia. Salix caroliniana has no status rank in Florida, Georgia, Alabama, South Carolina, Tennessee, Arkansas, Texas, Oklahoma, Missouri, and Kansas.

== Management ==
Salix caroliniana has the ability to establish and grow in herbaceous wetlands. Prescribed fires are often used to manage these events. Fires kill large woody stems and the species sprouts readily after fire. As a result, the total number of stems does not change, but fire converts S. caroliniana from a tree into a shrub. Dormant season fires have been shown to reduce Salix caroliniana cover and basal area. Repeated fires have greater effects than single fire events.
