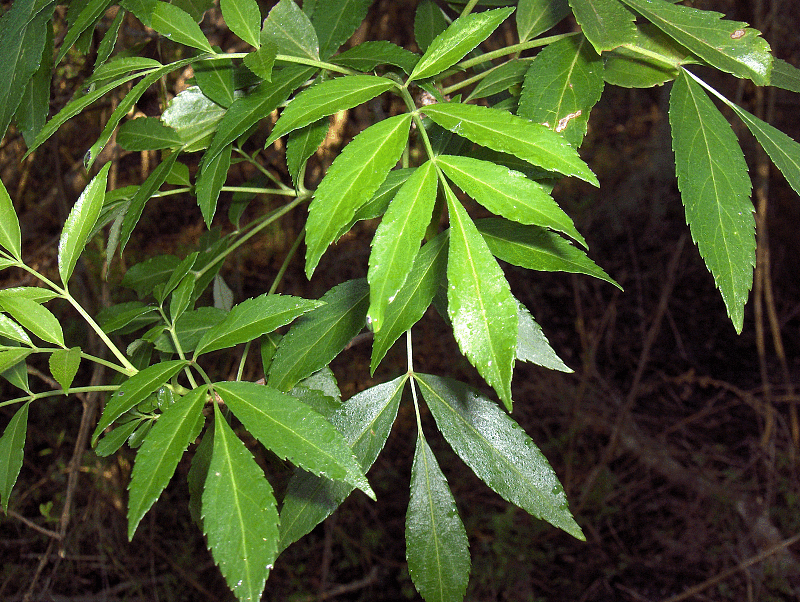

Conservation status
- Endangered (IUCN 3.1)

Scientific classification
- Kingdom: Plantae
- Clade: Tracheophytes
- Clade: Angiosperms
- Clade: Eudicots
- Clade: Asterids
- Order: Lamiales
- Family: Oleaceae
- Genus: Fraxinus
- Section: Fraxinus sect. Melioides
- Species: F. caroliniana

Binomial name
- Fraxinus caroliniana Mill.
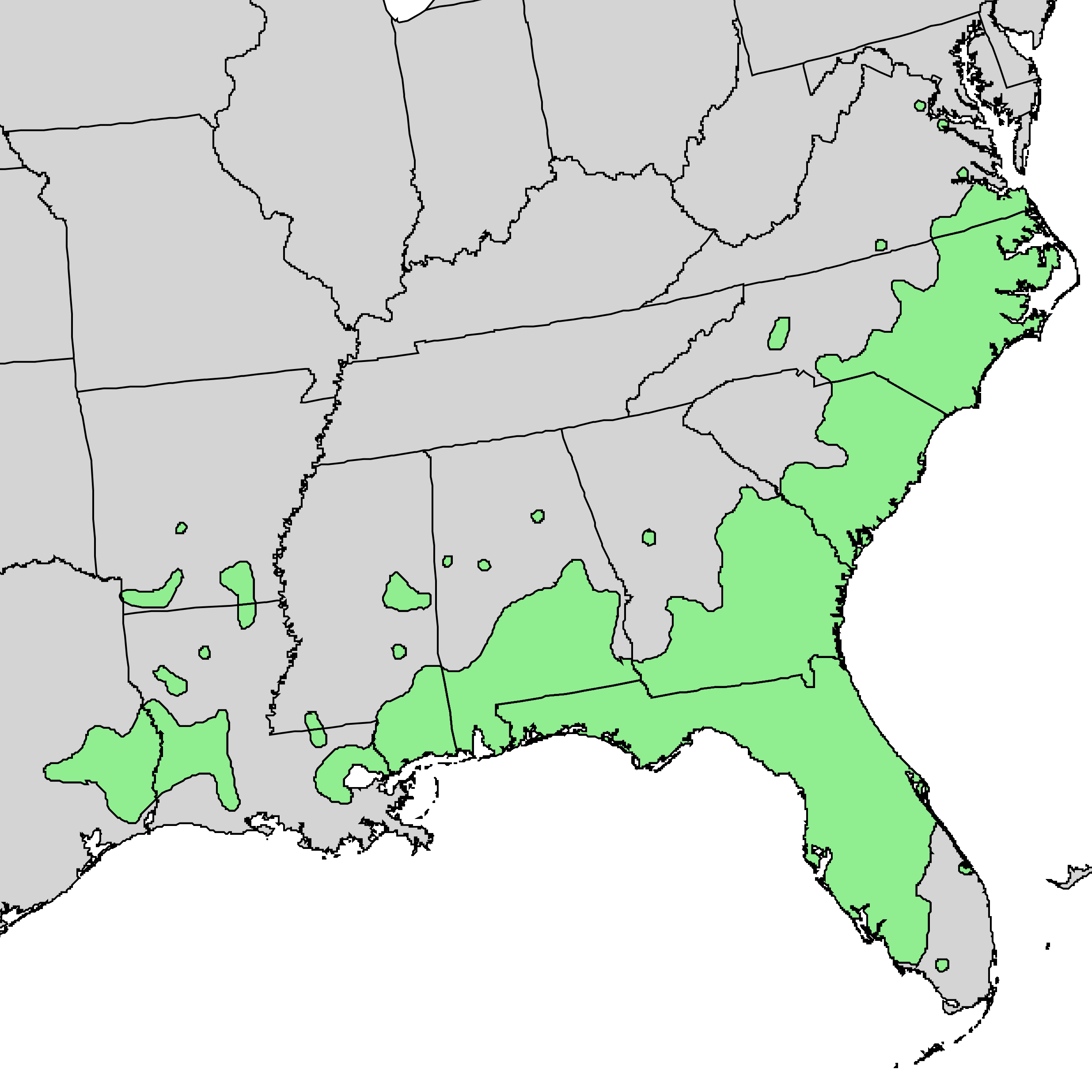
- Natural range of Fraxinus caroliniana in the United States

= Fraxinus caroliniana =

Species of ash

Fraxinus caroliniana, the pop ash, Florida ash, swamp ash, Carolina ash, or water ash, is a species of ash tree native to fhe Southeastern United States from southern Virginia to Texas. It was originally described by the botanist Philip Miller. It is a small tree about 40 ft (12 m) tall. It has compound leaves, with ovate, coarsely serrated leaflets 3–6 in (7.6–15.2 cm) long and 2–3 in (5.1–7.6 cm) wide arranged oppositely. The fruit is frequently a 3-winged samara with a flat seed portion, and a bright violet color. It is the smallest of eastern North American ash species. The wood is light and fairly soft. It is typically found in coastal swamps and subtropical lowlands. Fraxinus caroliniana is dioecious, with male and female flowers produced on separate individuals.

The tree is threatened by the emerald ash borer, an invasive species of beetle.

== Climate change and swamp ash ==
=== Flooding ===
Along the lower Mississippi River, flooding occurs during winter and spring. The trees are able to withstand the seasonal flooding. However, flooding has intensified due to climate change. The National Oceanic and Atmospheric Administration found the 2019 spring floods along the Mississippi River were among some of the costliest in history. Lee Jones of J. M. Jones Lumber Company says "The river has been up for so long, and for so much, that it's killed a lot of the trees".

=== Future concerns ===
The emerald ash borer is an invasive species from Asia. The beetles damage the trees by boring holes into the wood, damaging the trees' water and nutrient transport system. These beetles have spread to 35 U.S. states and five Canadian provinces. The emerald ash borer has not yet reached the lower Mississippi, but Jennifer Koch, a Forest Service biologist, says "it's only a matter of time" before it affects the swamp ash.

== Use as a tonewood ==
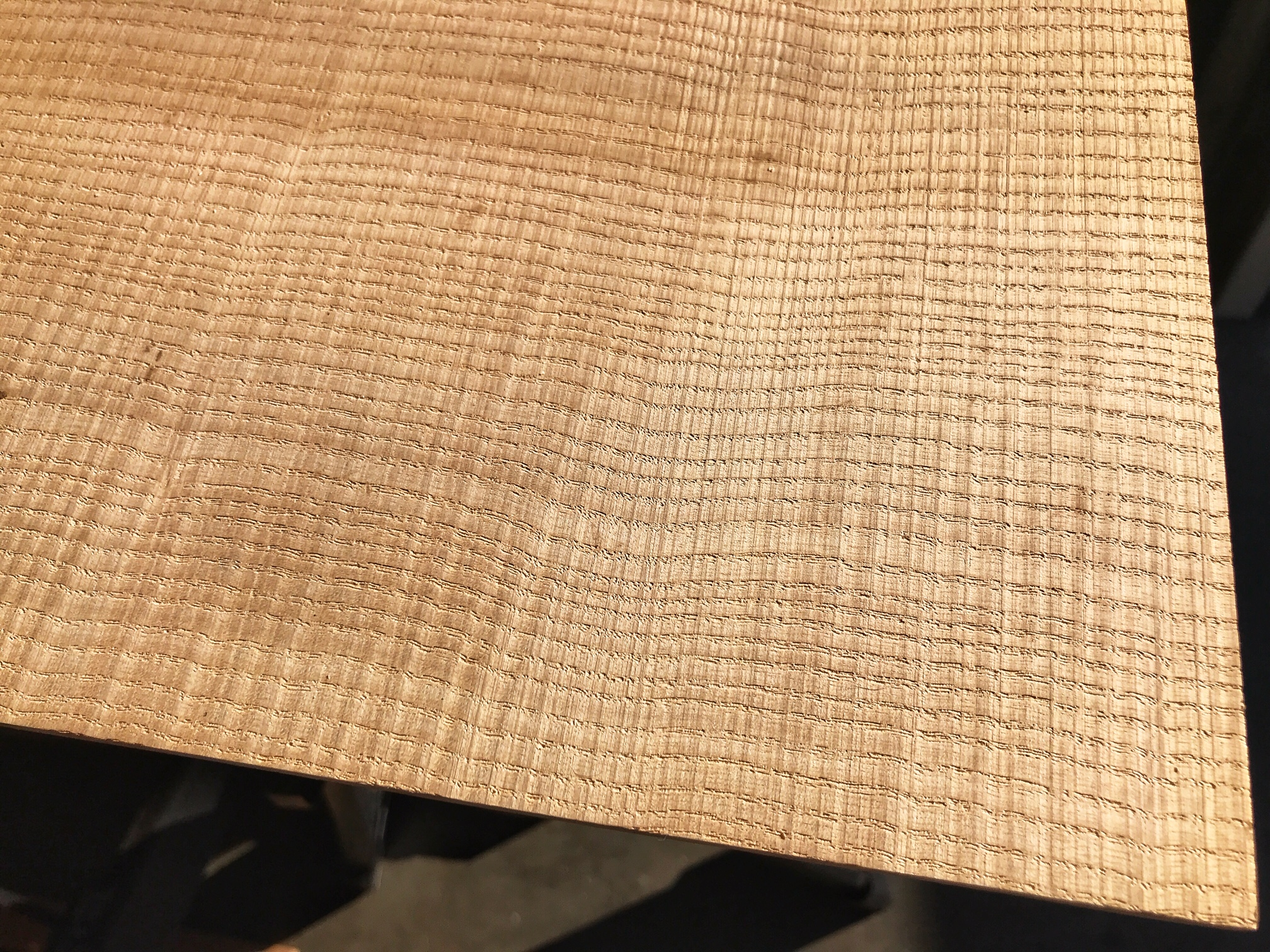
5/16" thick flame figure quartersawn ash guitar top, unmilled

Swamp ash is used as a tonewood for electric guitar bodies. Some Fender Stratocasters and Telecasters are made of ash, (such as Bruce Springsteen's Telecaster on the Born to Run album cover), as an alternative to alder. It exhibits a pronounced bright tone with a scooped midrange. It is lightweight, easy to work and sand, accepts glue, stain, paint and finish very well.
