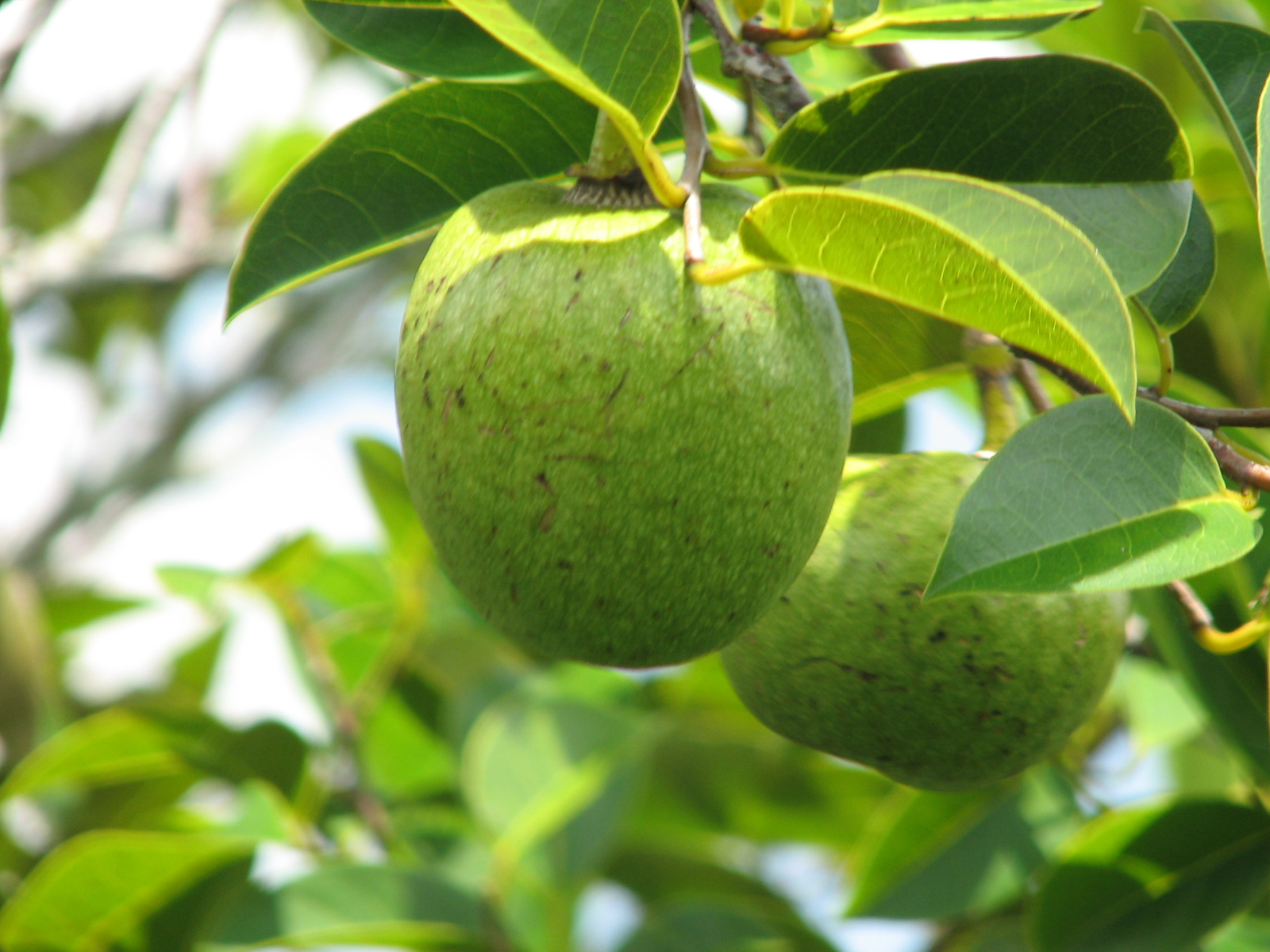
- Fruit

Conservation status
- Least Concern (IUCN 3.1)

Scientific classification
- Kingdom: Plantae
- Clade: Tracheophytes
- Clade: Angiosperms
- Clade: Magnoliids
- Order: Magnoliales
- Family: Annonaceae
- Genus: Annona
- Species: A. glabra

Binomial name
- Annona glabra L.

Synonyms
- Annona australis A.St.-Hil.; Annona chrysocarpa Lepr. ex Guill. & Perr.; Annona klainei Pierre ex Engl. & Diels; Annona klainei var. moandensis De Wild.; Annona laurifolia Dunal; Annona palustris L.; Annona palustris var. grandifolia Mart.; Annona peruviana Humb. & Bonpl. ex Dunal; Annona uliginosa Kunth; Asimina arborea Raf.; Cassia ketschta Hasselq.

= Annona glabra =

Species of tropical fruit tree

Annona glabra is a tropical fruit tree in the family Annonaceae, in the same genus as the soursop and cherimoya. Common names include pond apple, alligator apple (so called because American alligators often eat the fruit), swamp apple, corkwood, bobwood, and monkey apple. The tree is native to Florida in the United States, the Caribbean, Central and South America, and West Africa. It is common in the Everglades. The A. glabra tree is considered an invasive species in Sri Lanka and Australia. It grows in swamps, is tolerant of saltwater, and cannot grow in dry soil.

== Description ==
The trees grow to up to 12 m. They have narrow, gray trunks and sometimes grow in clumps. The leaves are ovate to oblong, each with an acute tip, 8–15 cm long and 4–6 cm broad with a prominent midrib. The upper surface is light to dark green. Leaves of the A. glabra are said to have a distinct smell, similar to green apples, that can distinguish it from mangroves. The fruit is oblong through spherical and apple-sized or larger, 7–15 cm long and up to 9 cm diameter, and falls when it is green or ripening yellowish. It disperses by floating to new locations, and it is food for many animal species such as wild boar. Reproduction begins around two years of age. A fruit contains 100 or more convex, light yellow-brown seeds, about 1 cm long. A. glabra flowers have a short life-span, and have a diameter of 2–3 cm. The flowers have three outer petals as well as three inner petals. Compared to the pale yellow or cream color of the petals, the inner base of the A. glabra flower is a bright red. Its pollen is shed as permanent tetrads.

== Ecology ==
A. glabra thrives in wet environments. The seeds and fruit of this plant can be dispersed during wet seasons where they fall into swamps and rivers. This allows the seeds and fruits to spread to coastlines. A 2008 study found that A. glabra seeds can withstand floating in salt water and fresh water for up to 12 months. About 38% of those seeds can then germinate in soil, though A. glabra roots do not do well with constant flooding. Another study in 1998 found that even under intense flooding, the 12-month lifespan of A. glabra seedlings was unaffected; the growth rate of A. glabra trees did decrease however over a 6-month period. Compared to other Annona seeds and trees, the A. glabra is still more resilient to instances of flooding.

== Uses ==
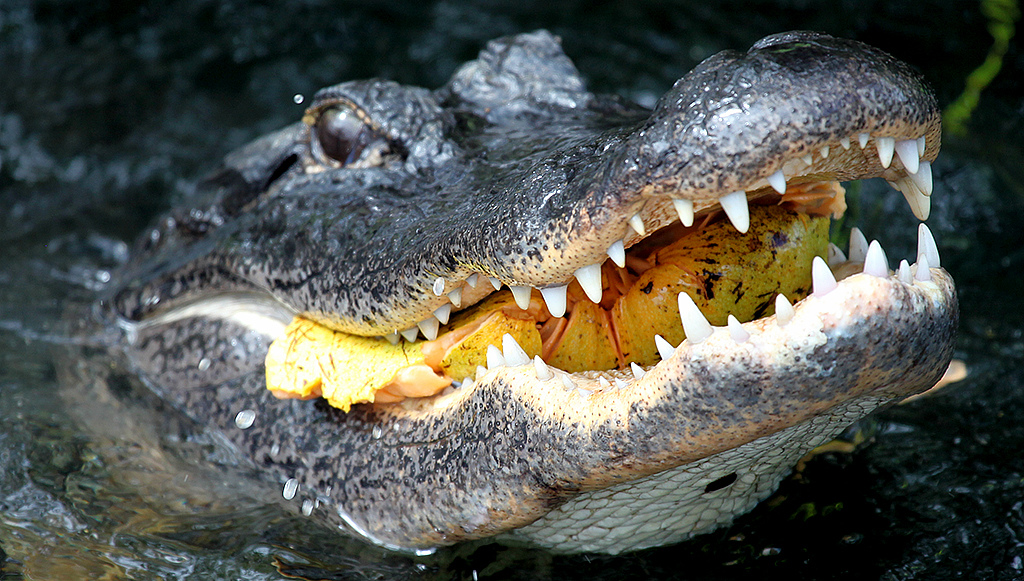
An American alligator eating a pond apple

Unlike the other Annona species, the pulp of the fruit when ripe is yellow through orange instead of whitish. The fruit is edible for humans and its taste is reminiscent of ripe honeydew melon. It can be made into jam, and it is a popular ingredient of fresh fruit drinks in Maldives. In the past, the seeds were crushed and cooked in coconut oil and applied to hair to get rid of lice.

The flesh is sweet-scented and agreeable in flavor, but it has never attained general popular use unlike soursop and other related fruits. Experiments in South Florida have been conducted to use it as a superior rootstock for sugar-apple or soursop. While the grafts initially appear to be effective, a high percentage of them typically fail over time; and Soursop on pond-apple rootstock has a dwarfing effect.

Recent research suggests that its alcoholic seed extract contains anticancer compounds that could be used pharmaceutically.

== Invasive species ==
It is a very troublesome invasive species in northern Queensland in Australia and Sri Lanka, where it grows in estuaries and chokes mangrove swamps. The A. glabra tree was introduced to North Queensland sometime around 1912 as both a rootstock for similar Annona species such as Annona atemoya, the custard apple. A. glabra seedlings carpet the banks and prevent other species from germinating or thriving. It also affects farms as it grows along fencelines and farm drains. It also invades and transforms undisturbed areas. This can be observed in the case of Australia's Eubenangee Swamp National Park where an outbreak occurred due to poor wetland management.

In Australia, A. glabra seeds can be spread by the southern cassowary. Seeds of the fruit have been found in cassowary dung with dispersal distances of up to 5212 m recorded in one 2008 study in the journal Diversity and Distributions. The southern cassowary itself however is an endangered species in Australia. According to the Australian government's Department of the Environment and Energy, there is only around 20-25% of cassowary habitat remaining. Additionally, part of the government's recovery plan includes actions towards establishing nurseries filled with plants that the cassowary consumes. Because the A. glabra is among the foods eaten by southern cassowary, revegetation may be necessary to ensure that cassowary have alternative food sources available. When the A. glabra population is controlled, natural vegetation can regenerate without human intervention.

Because of its impact on the environment as an invasive weed, the Australian government classifies the A. glabra as a Weed of National Significance (WONS). Additionally, the A. glabra was considered the highest ranked species in 2003 in a Wet Tropics bioregion weed risk assessment. In Sri Lanka it was introduced as a grafting stock for custard apples and spread into wetlands around Colombo.

== Control strategies ==
=== Australia ===
The Australian government views the A. glabra as a weed, and as such offers through its Department of the Environment and Energy a control plan created in 2001 for citizens that aims at eliminating the A. glabra by 20 years. The plan includes six steps that property owners can take to determine how to control and monitor an outbreak of A. glabra as well as how to minimize financial damage. To disincentivize the cultivation and spread of A. glabra by humans, its sale and entry is banned throughout most of Australia.

Options for the control of the A. glabra include fire, chemical, and mechanical controls including combinations of the three types. The best time of year to do so according to the government of Australia is during the time between August and November, which is the dry season. There are currently no studies that have looked at the biological control of A. glabra within Australia. Without studies, any actions taken to eliminate the A. glabra with biological controls could inadvertently affect native Australian apple species that belong to the same family.

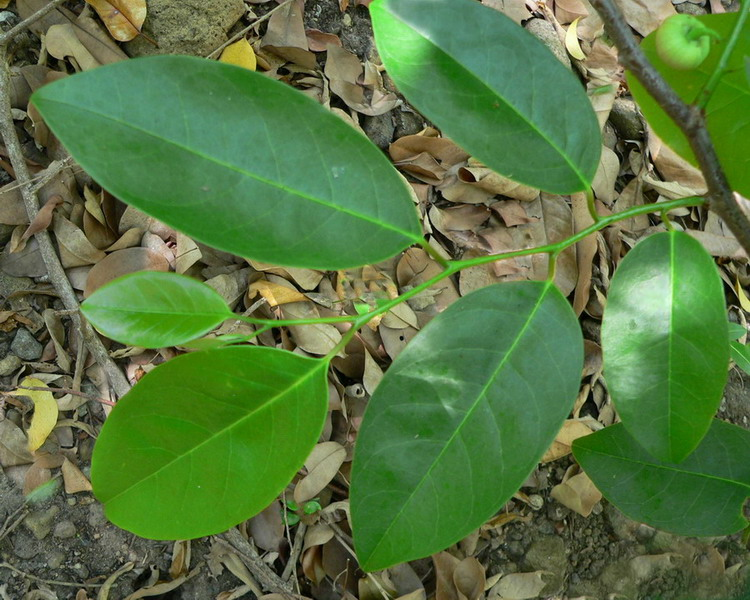
Leaves

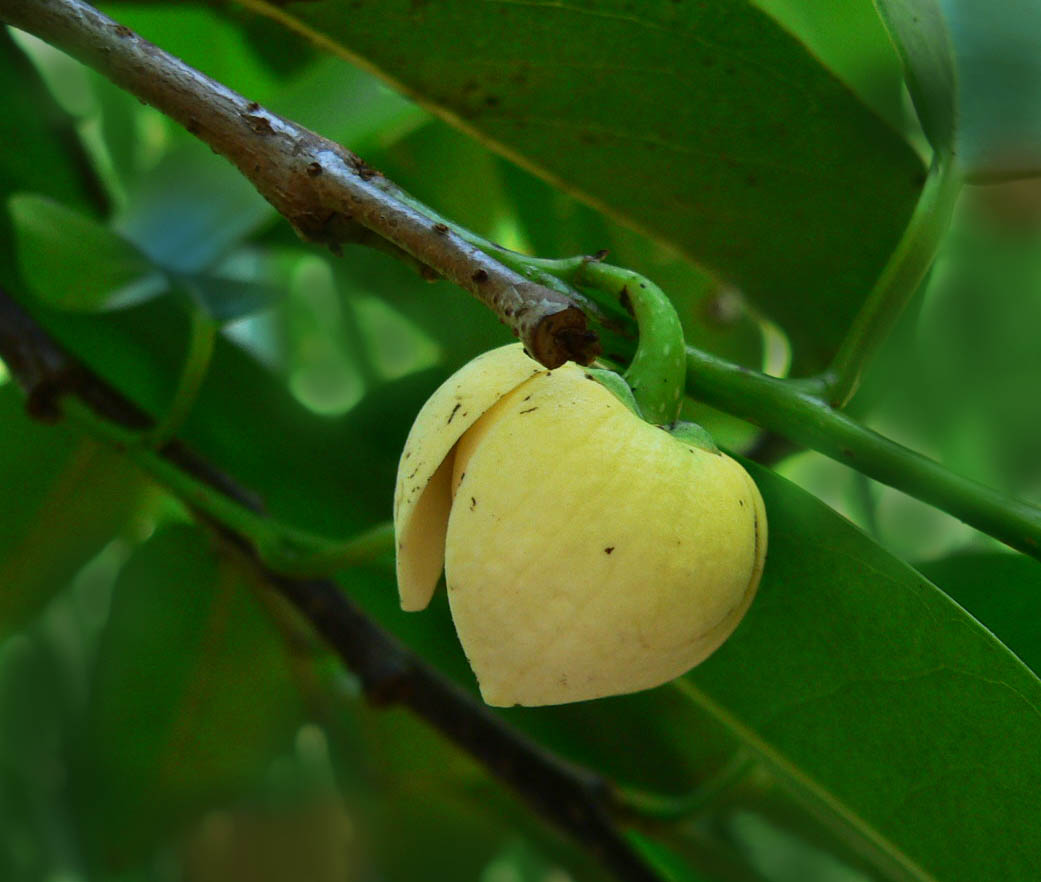
Flower

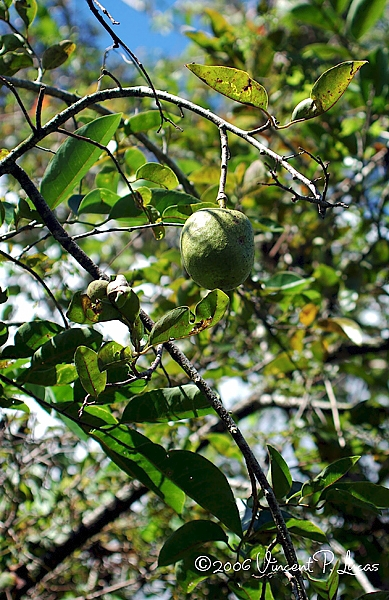
Fruit

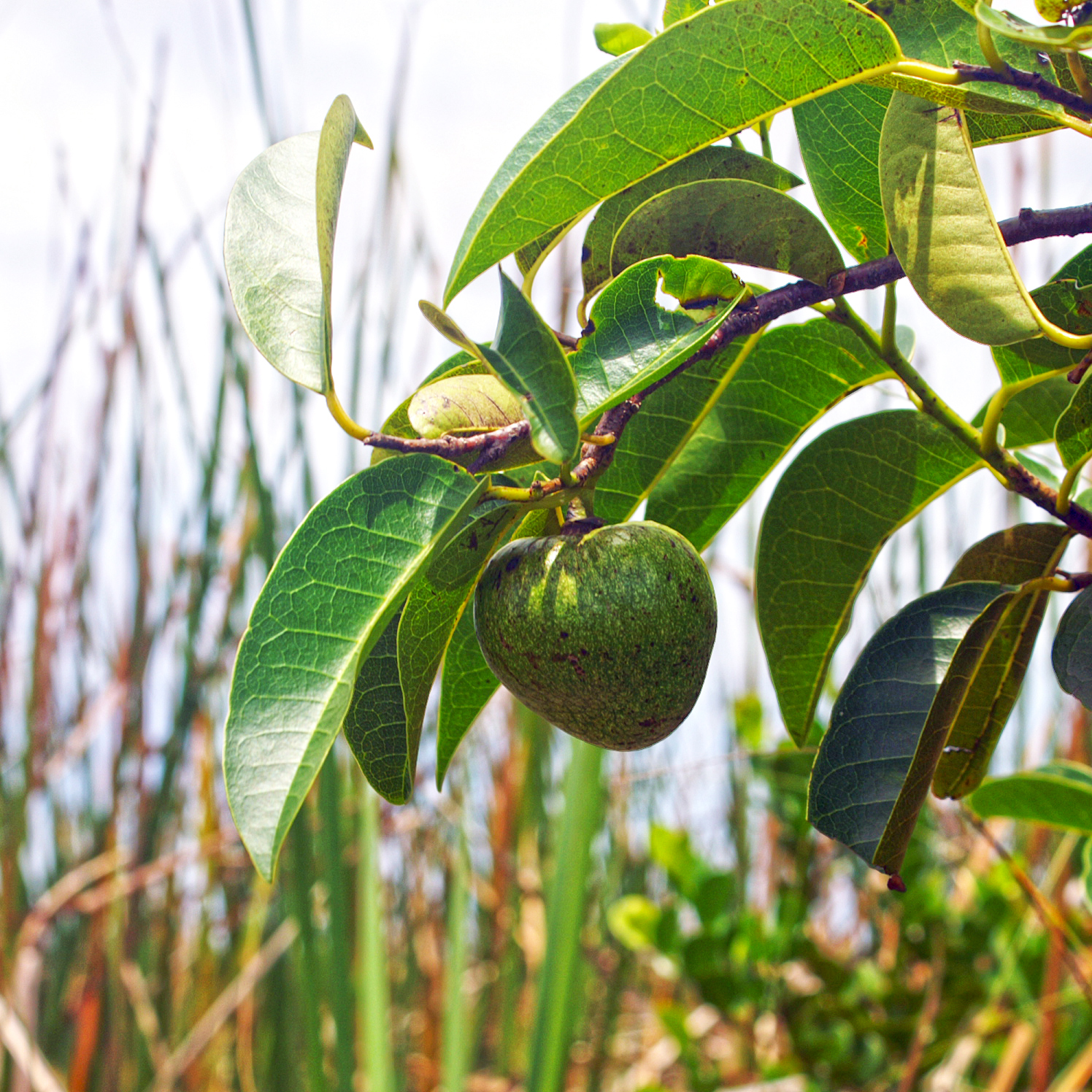

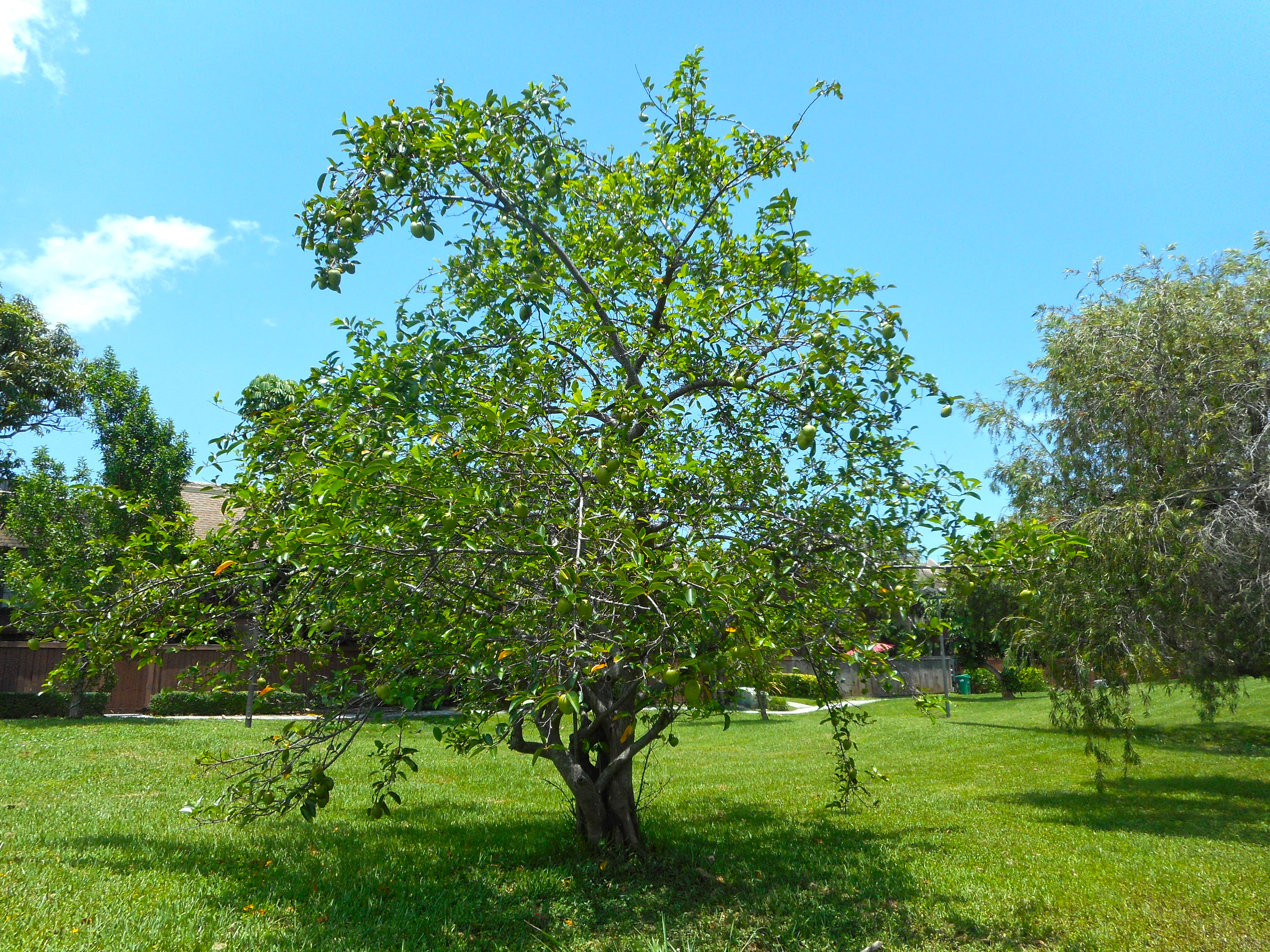

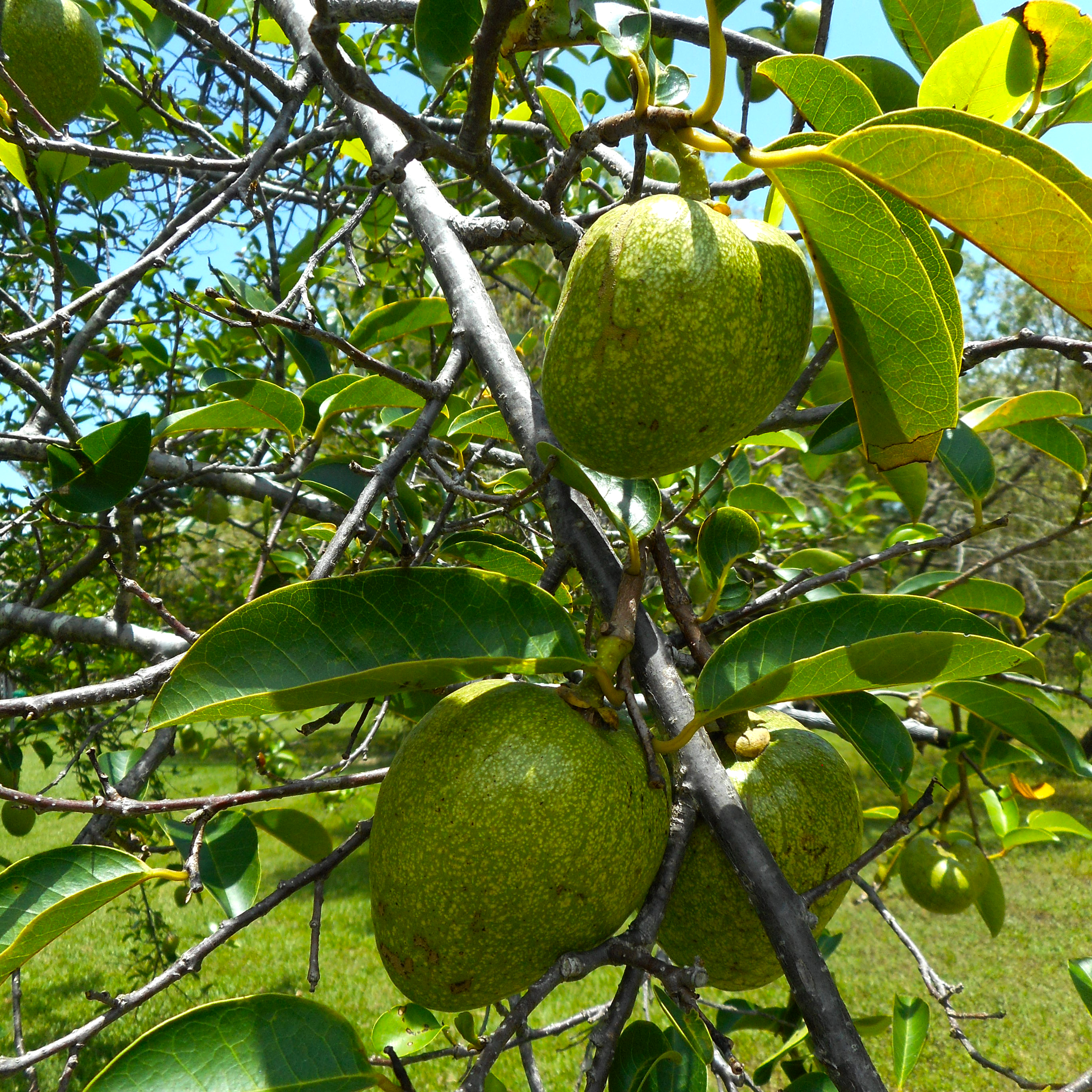

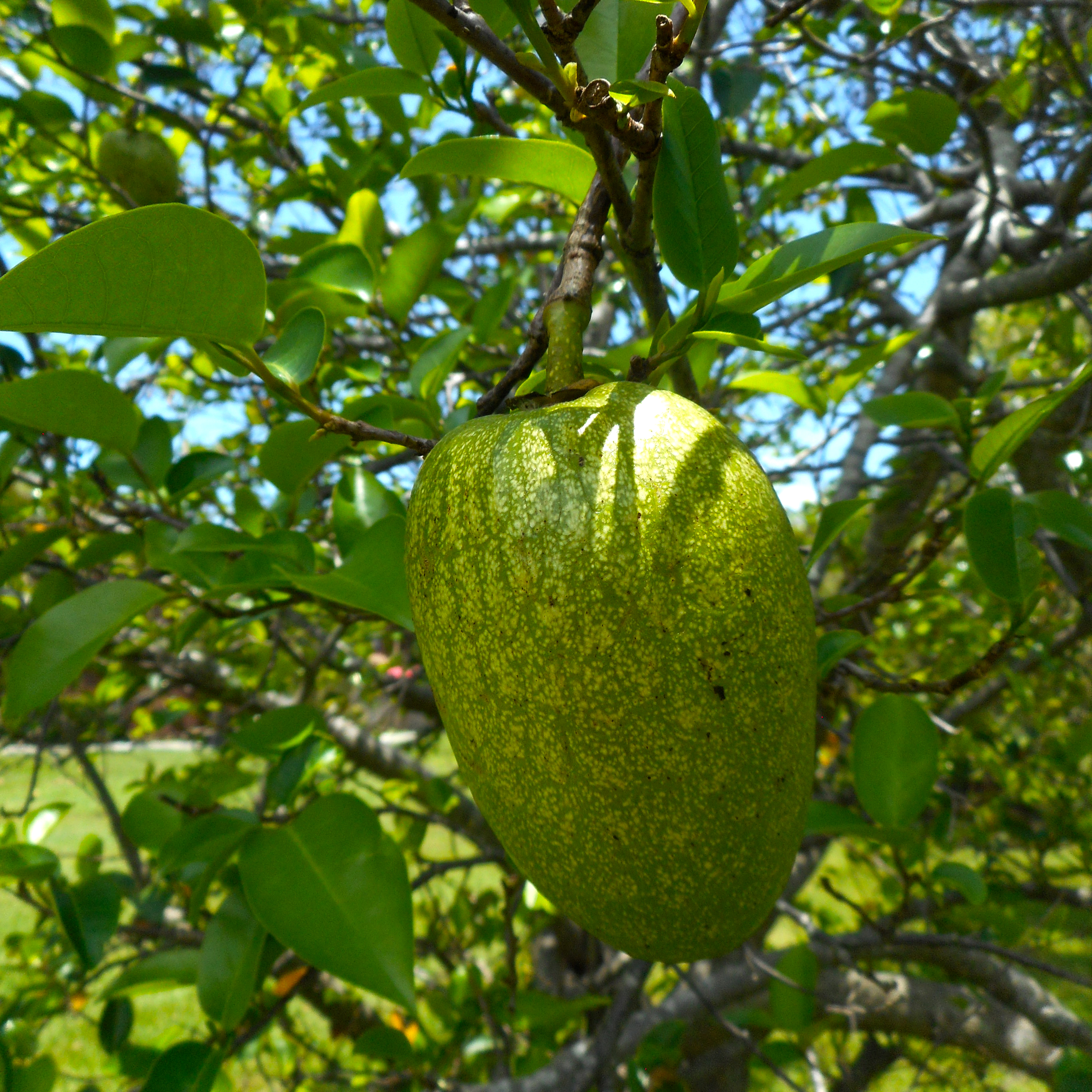
