= Morningside Park =

Morningside Park may refer to:

- Morningside Park (Manhattan), New York
- Morningside Park (Toronto), Ontario
- Morningside Nature Center, Gainesville, Florida
