= Paynes Prairie Preserve State Park =

Protected ecological system in Florida

- Looking north from the Prairie observation tower

- Location within Florida Location within the United States
- Interactive map of Paynes Prairie Preserve State Park
- Location: 100 Savannah Blvd., Micanopy, Alachua County, Florida, United States
- Nearest city: Gainesville, Florida
- Coordinates: 29°34′59″N 82°19′59″W
- Area: 21,000 acres (85 km^{2})
- Established: 1971
- Governing body: Florida Department of Environmental Protection

U.S. National Natural Landmark
- Designated: December 1974

Paynes Prairie Preserve State Park is a Florida State Park, encompassing a 21,000-acre (85 km^{2}) savanna in Alachua County, Florida lying between Micanopy and Gainesville. It is also a U.S. National Natural Landmark. It is crossed by both I-75 and U.S. 441 (which has a scenic outlook ramp). It is in the center of the Paynes Prairie Basin. The basin's primary source of drainage is Alachua Sink. During occasional wet periods, the basin will become full. A notable period occurred from 1871 to 1891 when the Alachua Sink was temporarily blocked. During this period, shallow draft steamboats were a frequent sight on Alachua Lake in the center of the prairie. The region was also historically known as the Alachua Savannah. Its drainage has been modified by several canals. Since 1927, Camps Canal has linked the basin to the River Styx which leads to Orange Lake and eventually the Atlantic Ocean through the St. Johns River. That reduced the basin's water intake by half. Additional changes to the prairie's environment have been detrimental to its hydrology. In 1970, the state of Florida acquired the land and has been in the process of restoring the environment to a more natural condition ever since.

Heavy rains have temporarily restored Alachua Lake on several occasions, most recently in September 2017, when Hurricane Irma dropped several inches of rain and damaged a levee, flooding much of the basin for months.

== History ==
=== La Chua ranch ===
Before 1637, Francisco Menéndez Márquez, the royal treasurer of Spanish Florida, established the La Chua ranch in the vicinity of Paynes Prairie. It spanned 87 square miles (230 km^{2}) and would be, by the late 17th-century, the largest cattle ranch in the colony. It was raided several times by various Native groups and by French buccaneers. It became abandoned by 1706.

=== Cuscowilla and Paynes Town ===
The prairie became the stronghold of the Alachua band of the Seminole tribe under chief Ahaya the Cowkeeper by the mid-1700s. The Seminole town of Cuscowilla was located near modern Micanopy, Florida. In 1774 the area, then known as Alachua Savannah, was visited by William Bartram who noted in his book, "Bartram's Travels", that it was used as grazing ground by the local Seminole.

By the 1790s, Cuscowilla had been relocated to a site east of Lake Wauburg and become known as Paynes Town. The town and the surrounding prairie was named for the Cowkeeper's eldest surviving son, Payne. Paynes Town was destroyed by Tennessee Volunteers in 1813. Fort Tarver and Ford Crane were both located in Paynes Prairie during the Second Seminole War.

After Indian Removal, the area became inhabited by European Americans, their slaves, and very small number of free people of color. A railroad line was built along the northern edge of the prairie in the late 1800s.

In 1868, heavy rains filled the basin, but quickly drained away. About 1871, Alachua Sink was temporarily blocked and the basin became full for several years. From 1871 to 1891 Alachua Lake was receiving enough water that steamboats were able to be used on it. A line ran from Chacala Pond to Sweetwater Branch. About 1889, the water level of Alachua Lake began to slowly drop. During the winter of 1890/1891 the lake was 58 feet deep. Then in late July and August 1891, the water levels of Alachua Lake suddenly dropped. Its banks were littered with dead fish and dead alligators. At one point, the water levels dropped eight feet in the span of ten days and left the lake with only its two main basins with any water. This draining event marooned one of the steamers then plying the lake, and similar events had occurred in 1823 and 1870.

=== Camp Ranch and the canal system ===
By the 1920s, most of the prairie had been purchased by Camp Ranch, Inc. In 1927, Camp Ranch, Inc. built a canal system to divert water coming into Alachua Lake in the Paynes Prairie Basin from Newnans Lake to Orange Lake through the River Styx. The diversion of the water meant a loss of 50% of the surface water supply to Paynes Prairie. That same year, the state of Florida built U.S. 441 through the basin. In 1937, Camp Ranch began construction on the Sweetwater Branch Canal. It was designed to channelize the flow from Sweetwater Branch directly into Alachua sink instead of allowing it to settle in Lake Alachua. The subsequent urbanization of Gainesville increased the amount of stormwater directed into Sweetwater Branch and also pollutants. In 1964, the construction of I-75 through the western section of the prairie was completed.

=== Conservation and restoration ===
In 1970, the state of Florida acquired the land from Camp Ranch, Inc. It was designated a National Natural Landmark in December 1974. In 1975, the Florida Park Service temporarily restored half of the historic rate of flow of water from Newnans Lake to Paynes Prairie. During the 1970s and 1980s, officials reintroduced several species to Paynes Prairie.

As of 2013, Paynes Prairie receives one-third of its water from Newnans Lake, one-third from all other sources, and one-third from direct rainfall. The removal of the canals that same year had restored 7.95 miles of dikes and canals. Due to occasional heavy rains the rate of water from Prairie Creek to the Prairie is eliminated entirely to prevent damage to U.S. 441.

In the mids-2010s, the Sweetwater Wetlands Park, a 125-acre constructed enhancement wetland, was put in place on the northern section of Paynes Prairie. The project was designed to restore sheetflow to parts of the prairie obstructed by the Sweetwater Branch Canal and to also reduce the TMDL to acceptable levels that the Alachua Sink experiences. The Sweetwater Wetlands Park opened in May 2015.

== Environment ==
Paynes Prairie is part of the Southeastern conifer forests ecoregion. The prairie itself is a large Floridian highlands freshwater marsh, composed of different herbaceous plant communities that vary based on water depth. Wet, forested areas have southern coastal plain nonriverine basin swamps of bald cypress (Taxodium distichum) and swamp tupelo (Nyssa biflora). Southern coastal plain blackwater river floodplain forests grow along streams. On drier uplands, southern coastal plain oak domes and hammocks of southern live oak (Quercus virginiana) grow in areas with moderately moist soils, and Florida longleaf pine sandhills grow on drier, sandier soils.

Over 270 species of birds can be seen in the park as well as American alligators and small herds of Florida Cracker horses and Florida Cracker cattle, first herded by the Seminole were introduced in 1985. The plains bison were reintroduced to the park from the Wichita Mountains Wildlife Refuge in 1975, as part of the park service goal of restoring Florida's natural resources to pre-European settler conditions; they roamed this area until the late 18th century. When bison sightings occur, they usually appear along the Cone's Dike trail. The herd was reduced from thirty-five to seven individuals in the mid-1980s after an outbreak of Brucellosis. In the late 1990s, the herd was again reduced after inbreeding concerns. The buffalo herd reached a peak of 70 animals in 2011. The park began culling excessive animals in 2012, allowing a target population of about 8 to 10 bison to be free to roam the Florida prairie.

== Recreational activities ==
The park contains exhibits and an audio-visual program at the visitor center that explains the area's natural and cultural history. A 50-foot (15 m)-high observation tower near the visitor center provides a panoramic view of the preserve. Eight different trails provide opportunities for hiking, horseback riding, and bicycling. Ranger-led activities are offered on weekends, November through April. Fishing on Lake Wauburg is allowed and a boat ramp provides access for canoes and boats with electric motors. Full-facility campsites are available for overnight visitors.

The Sweetwater Wetlands Project includes a network of trails that allow visitors to walk along the berms that form the enhancement wetland, an outdoor classroom, a viewing tower, and a visitors center.

The park is a 'gateway site' for the Great Florida Birding Trail.

The Space Shuttle could be seen from Paynes Prairie about a minute into its flight.

The Gainesville-Hawthorne State Trail also runs through Paynes Prairie. Several scenic view points lead off of the trail and into the park. Wildlife will often come up to the trail at certain times in the day.

== Hydrology ==
Alachua Lake flows into the Floridan aquifer through Alachua Sink. (Various sources stating that water entering the Alachua Sink flows to the Santa Fe River may be based on a story told by a Seminole guide to a white explorer in 1823, that a Seminole who had drowned in the sink was later found in the river.) The prairie receives water from a number of sources.

- Bivens Arm
  - Tumbling Creek
  - Little Tumbling Creek
- Sweetwater Branch
- Prairie Creek
  - Newnans Lake
    - Hatchet Creek
    - Lake Forest Creek
    - Little Hatchet Creek
- Chacala Run
  - Chacala Pond
    - Sawgrass Run
      - Sawgrass Pond
        - Lake Wauburg
          - Georges Pond
            - Burnt Pond
- Dog Branch

=== Canals and dikes ===
As of 2013, Paynes Prairie had about 38 miles of dikes and 50 miles of canals. They include

- Alligator Point Dike
- Angel Dike
- Bivens Arm Canal
- Bolen Bluff Dike
- Borrow Dike
- Burnt Pond Dike
- Camps Canal
- Cones Dike
- East-West Dike
- Government Dike
- I-75 Dikes
- Main Canal
- Main Finger Dike
- Mystery Dike
- Otto Waley Dike
- Rice Paddy Dikes
- Sweetwater Branch Canal
- U.S. 441 Dikes
- VORTAC Dike

=== Improvement plans ===
The status of the highways on low dikes has led to some within Florida's Department of Environmental Protection to recommend their possible replacement with raised roadways on bridges to ameliorate the biological and hydrological impact of the roadways as they currently exist. Replacements of other canals has also been planned. There are also plans to protect and promote various archaeological and historical sites on the prairie.

== Gallery ==
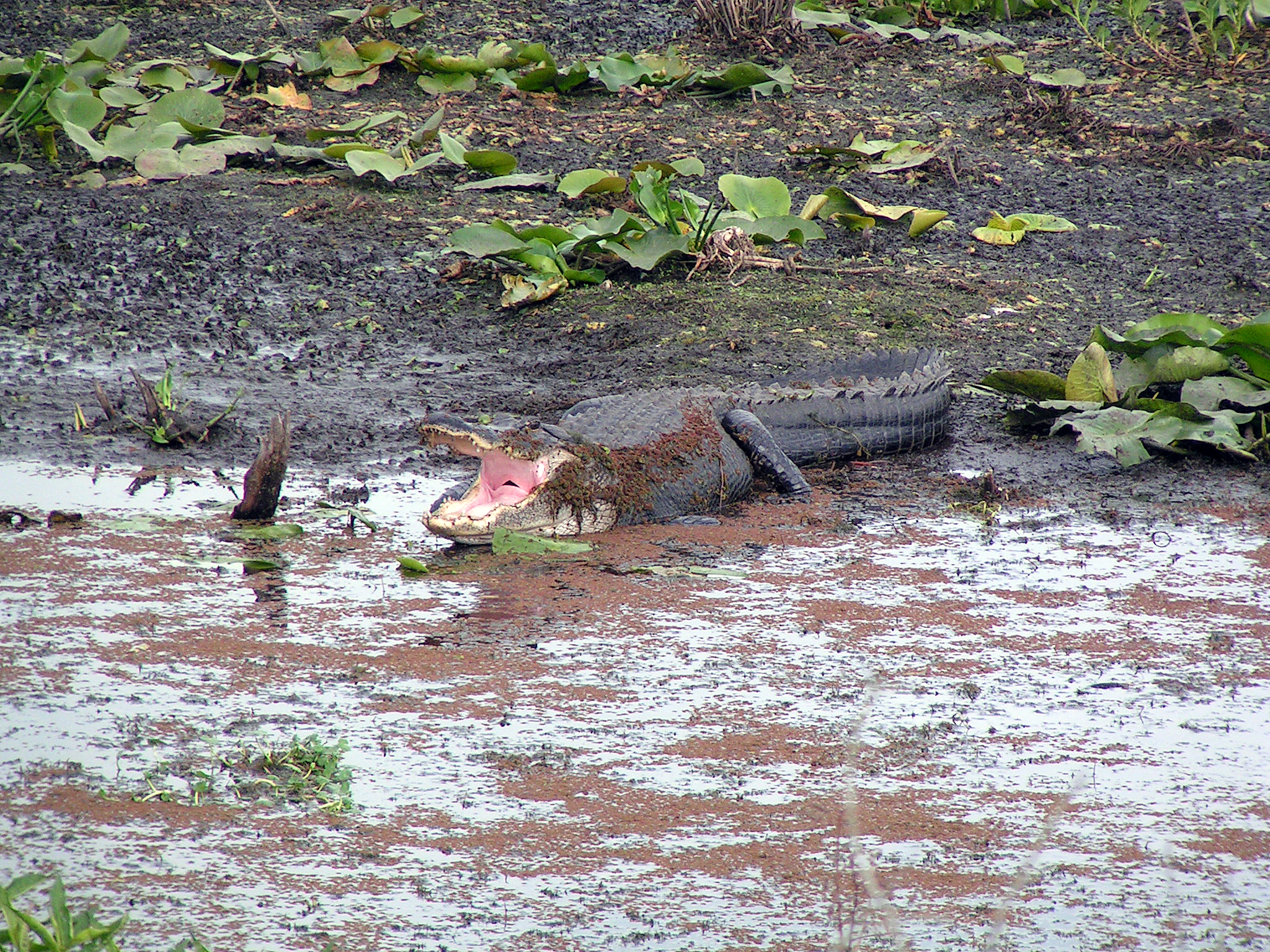
Just one of the many American alligators.

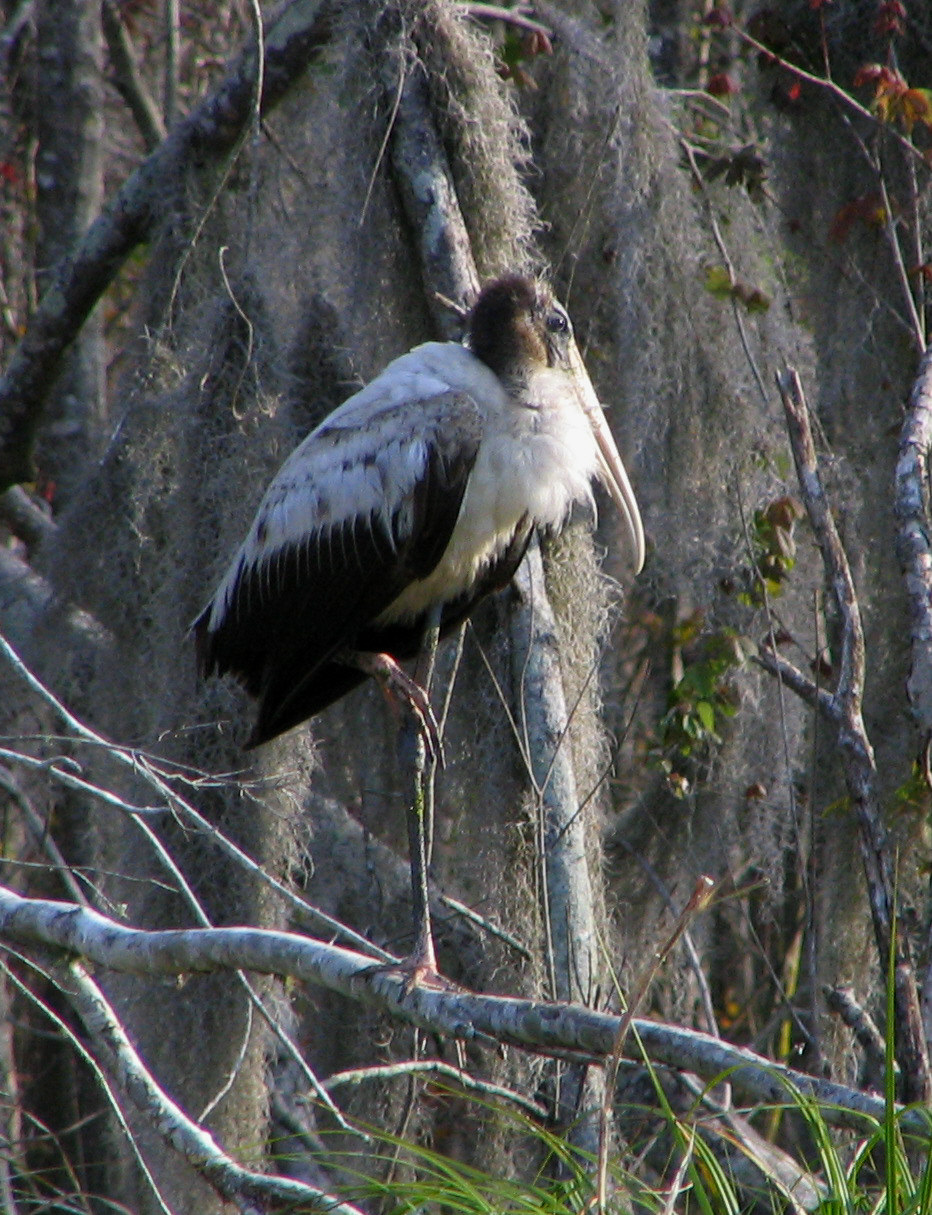
A wood stork at Paynes Prairie.

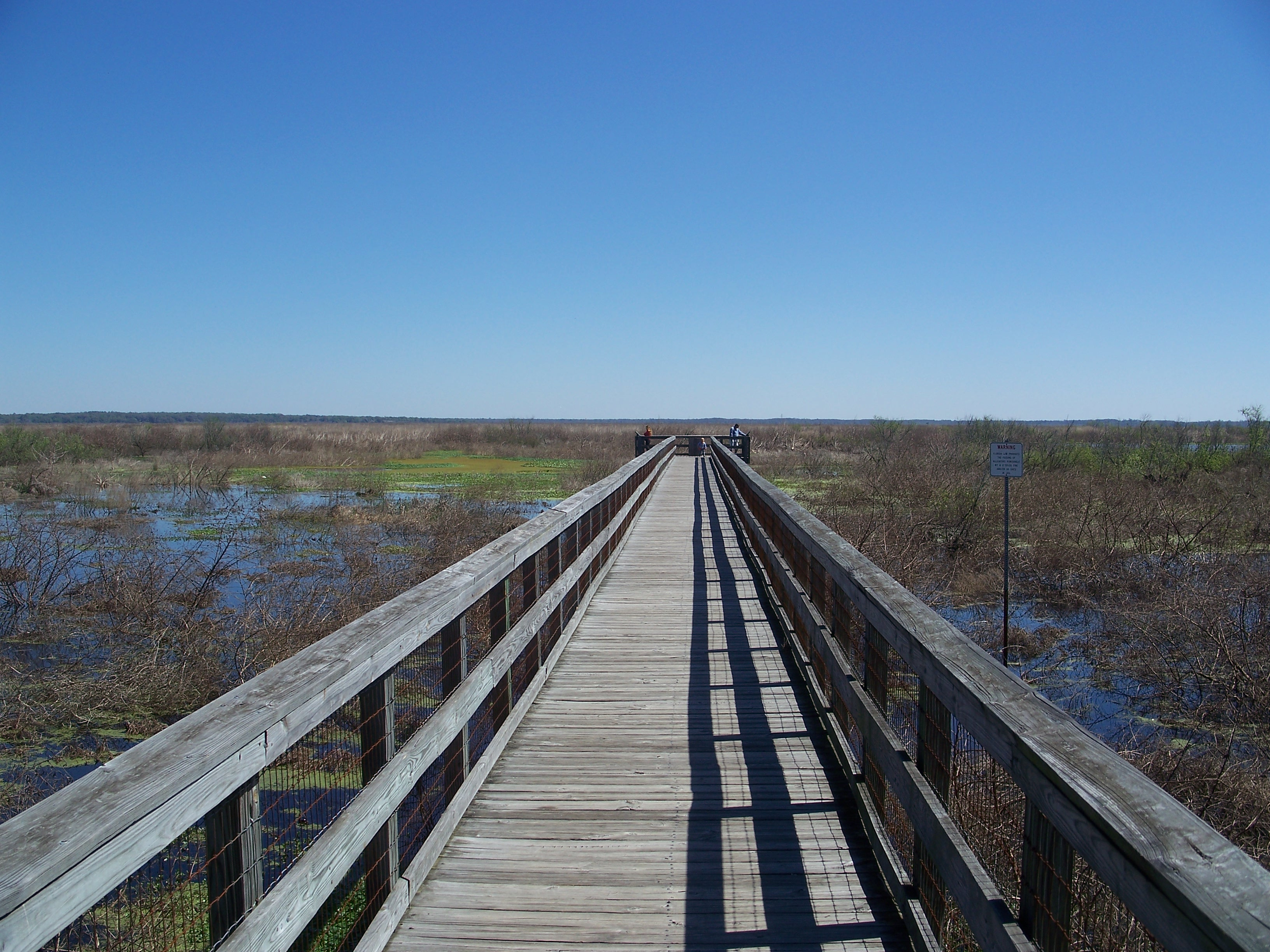
The US 441 overlook, facing east.

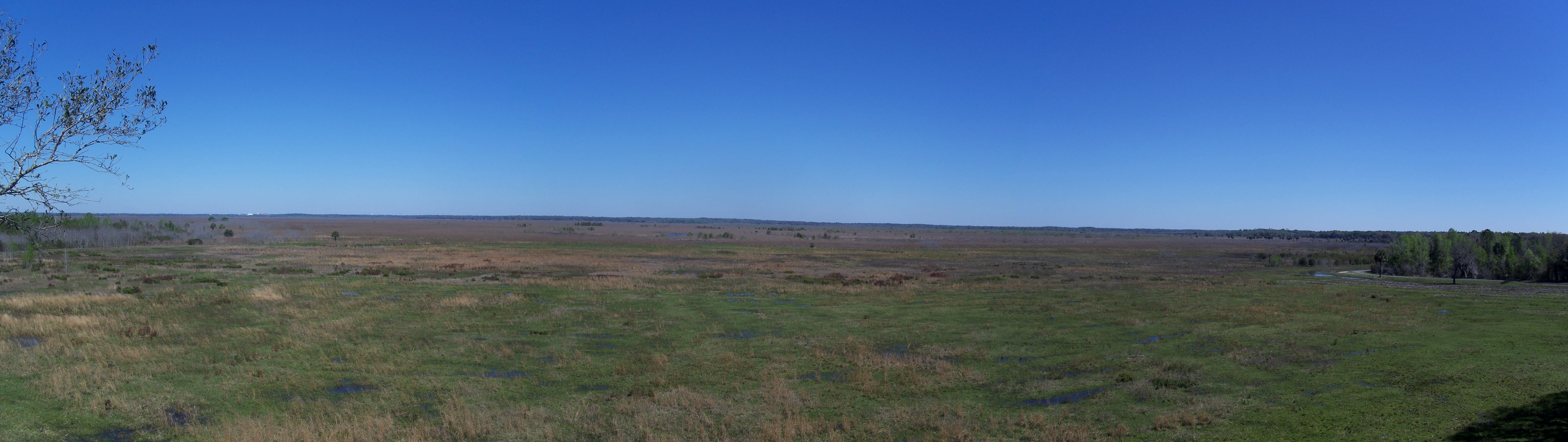
Panorama view from the observation tower.

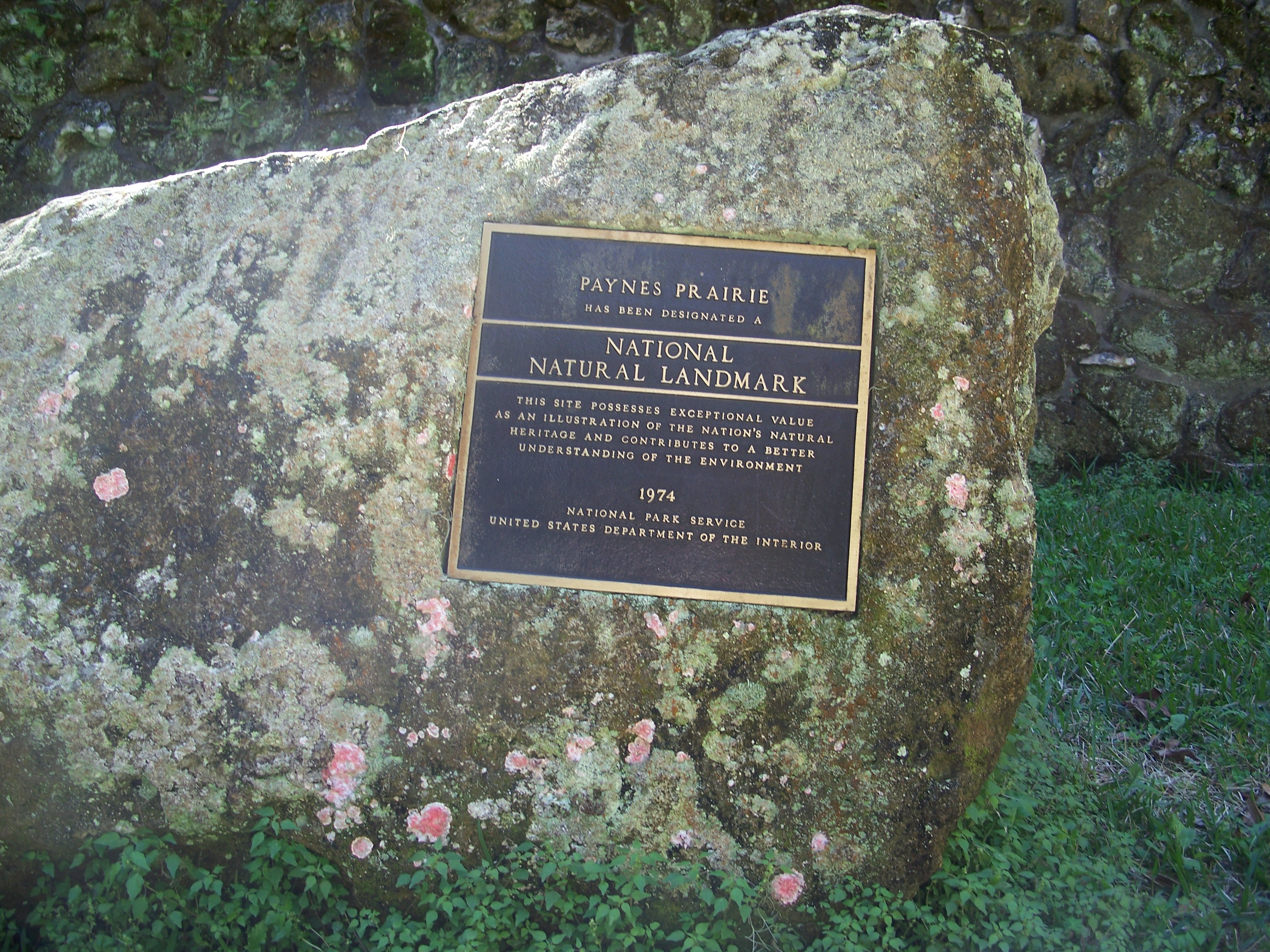
National Natural Landmark plaque.

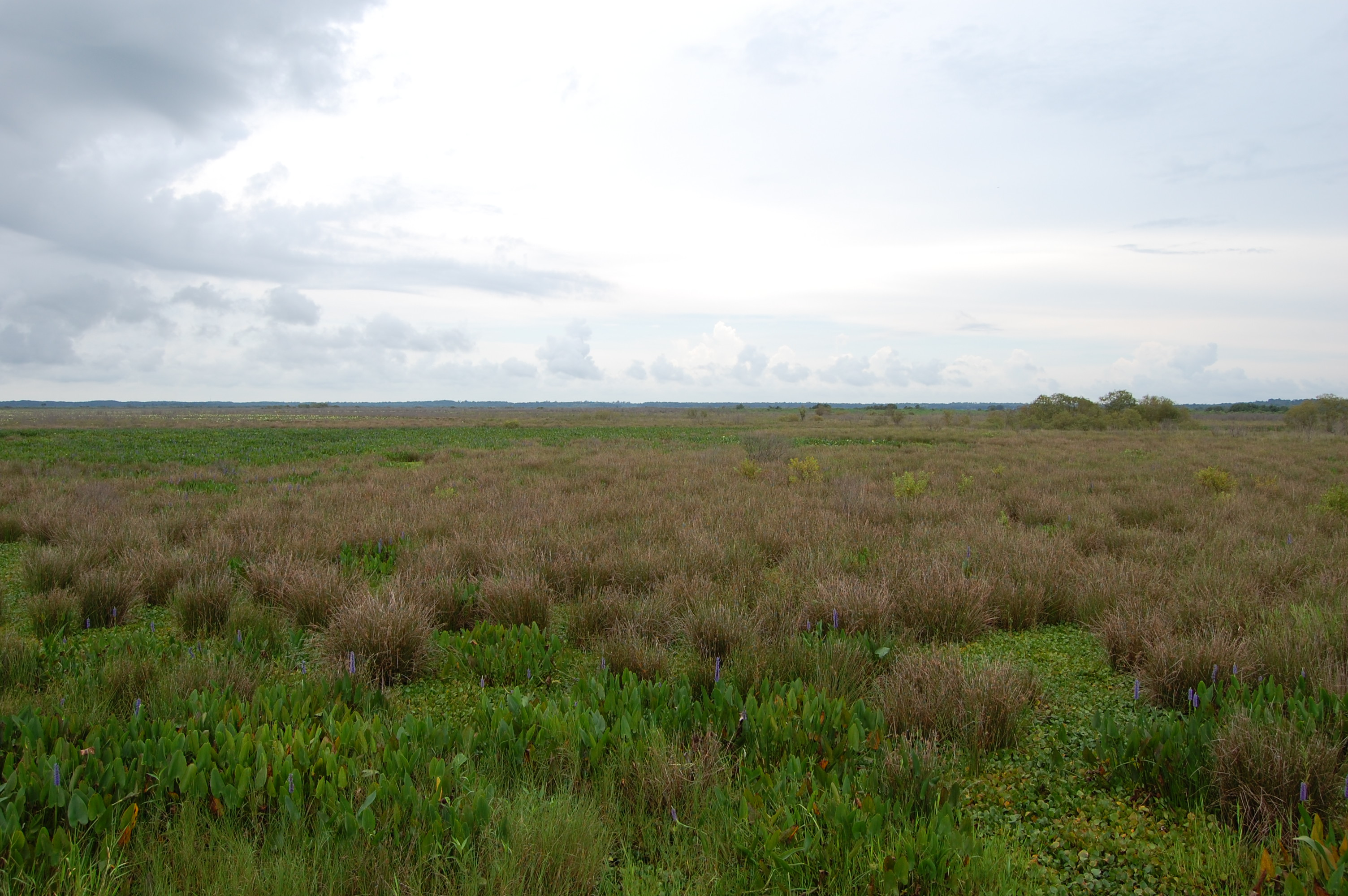
View from the tower at the Bolen Bluff trail.

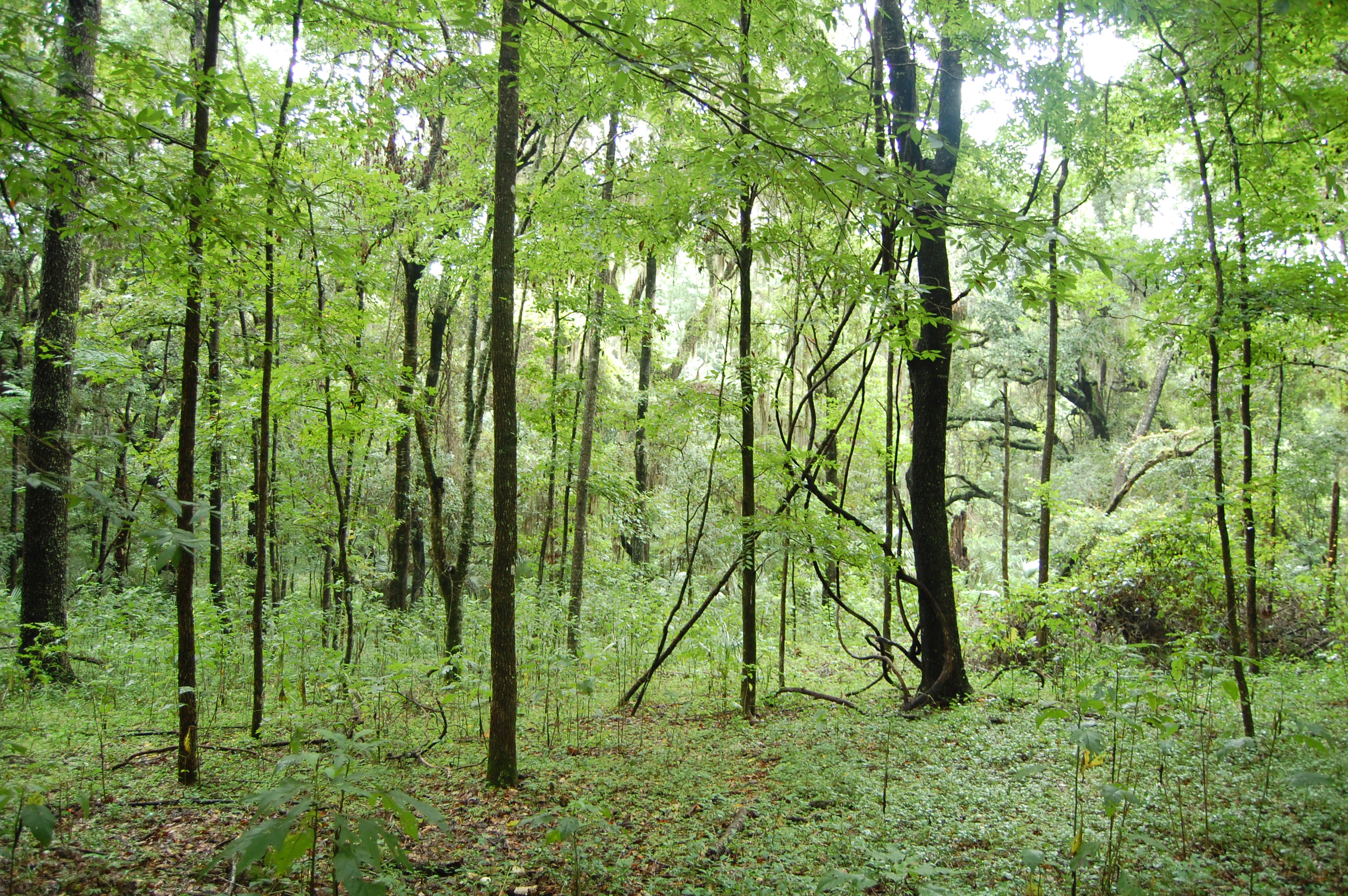
View from the forest of the Bolen Bluff trail.

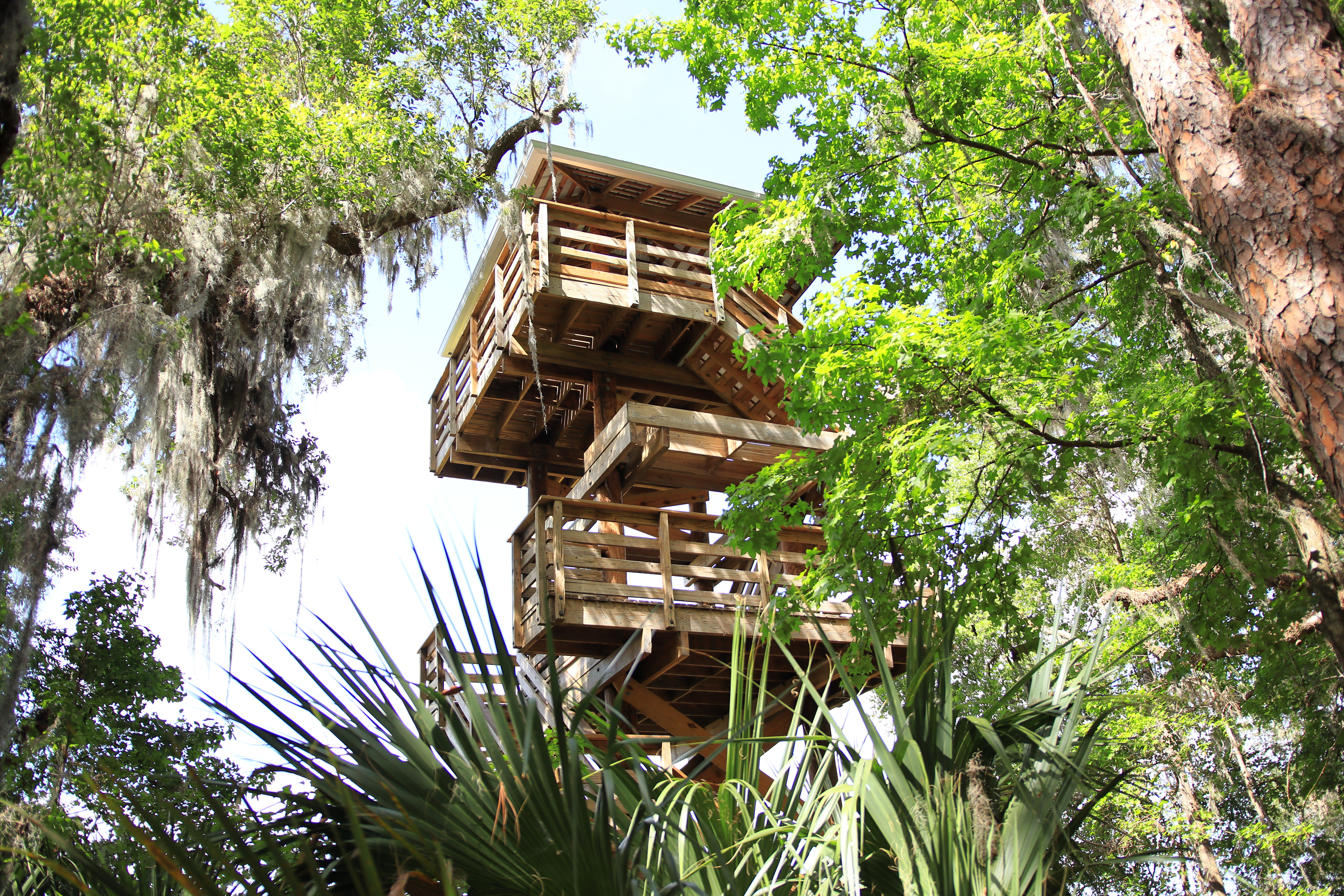
Paynes Prairie observation tower

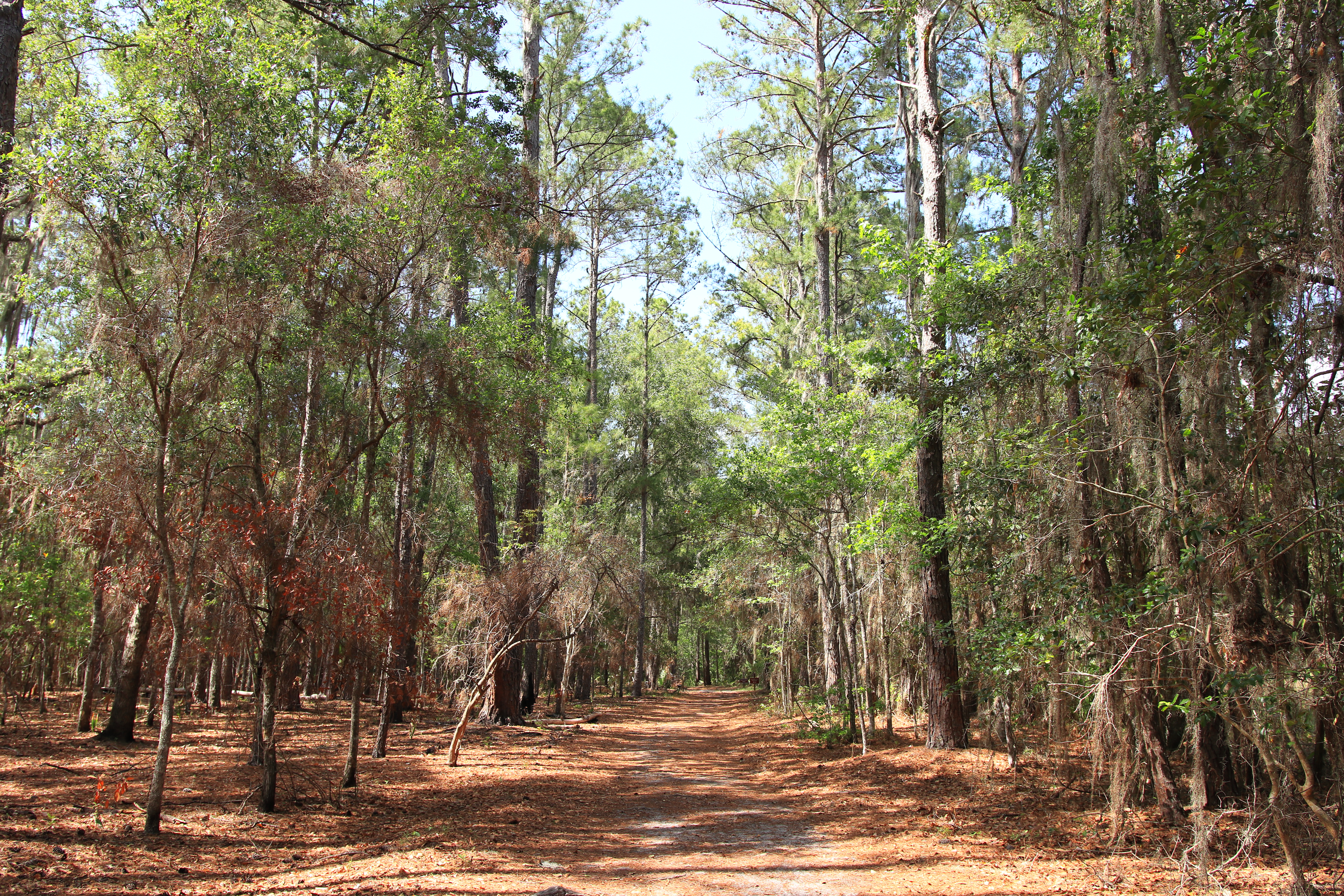
Paynes Prairie trail

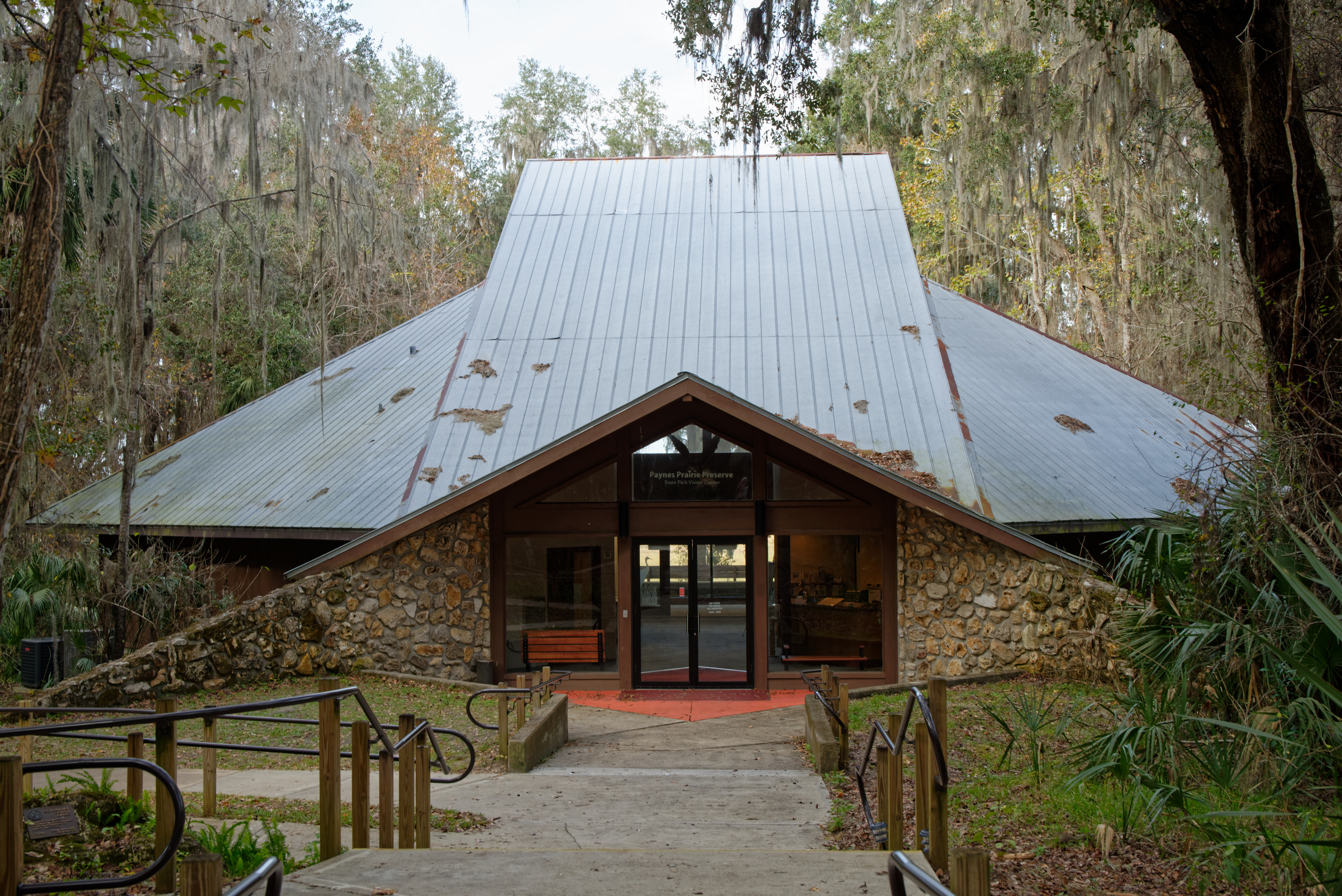
Visitor center, front

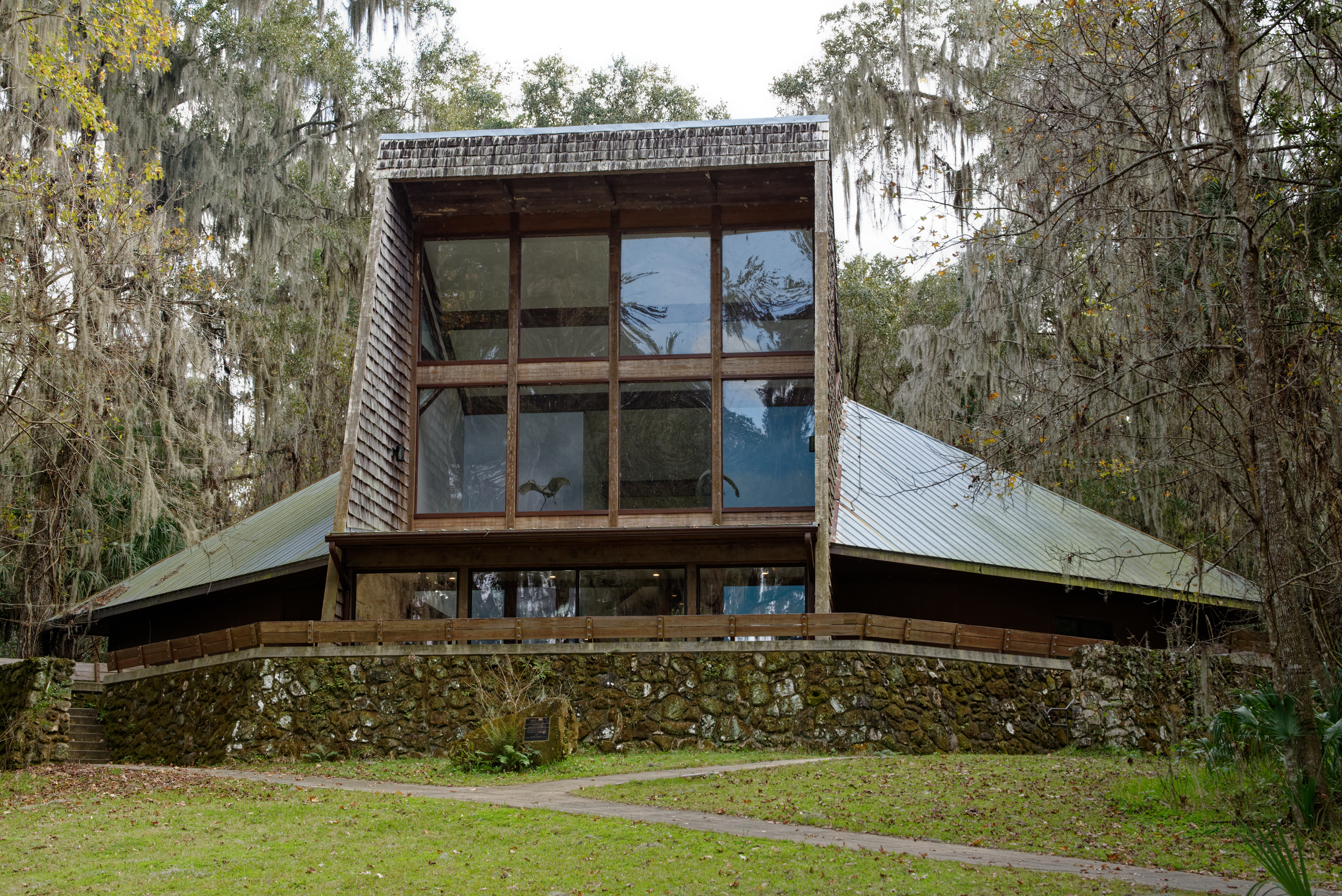
Visitor center, back

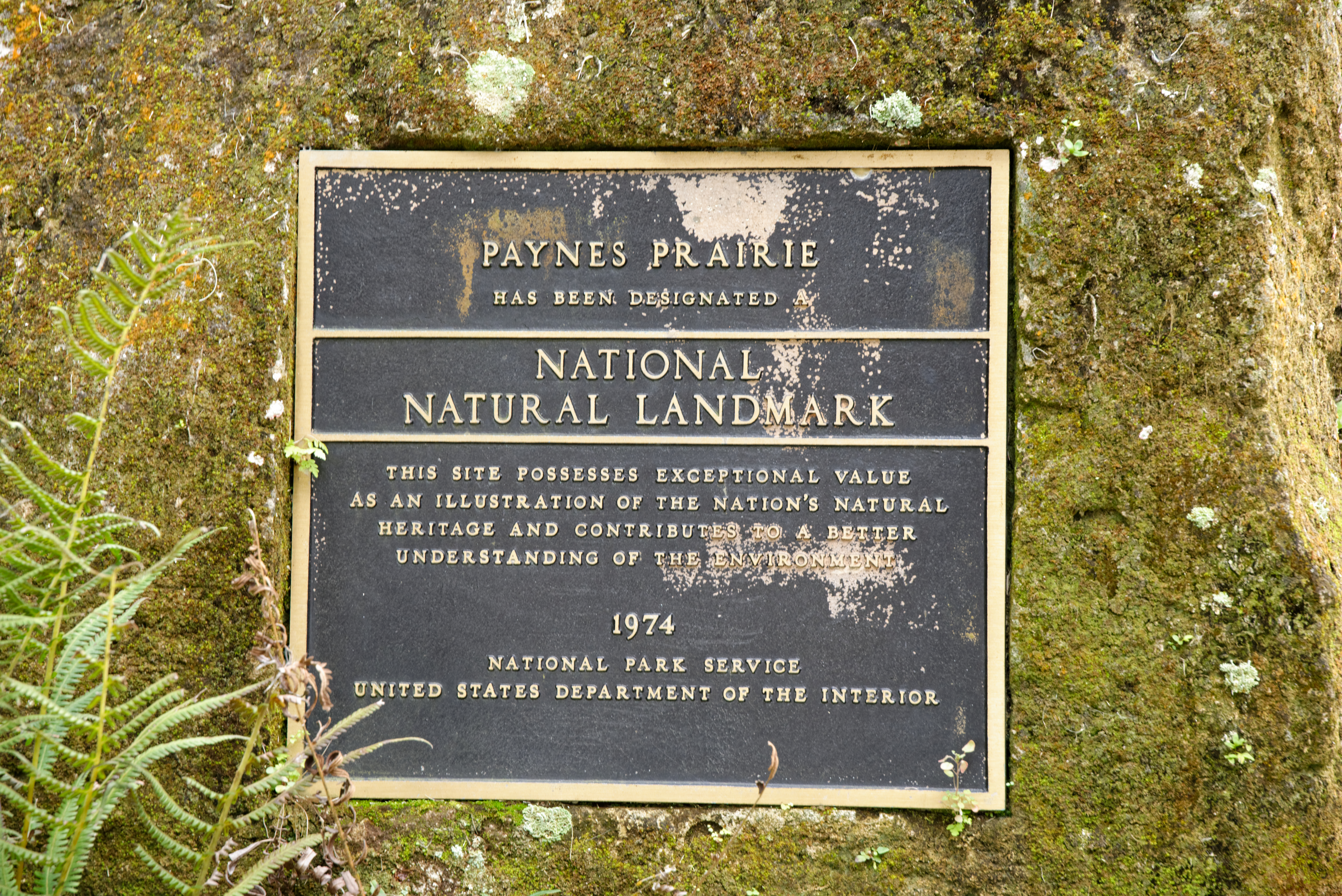
Plaque for National Natural Landmark

== See also ==
- Florida State Parks in Alachua County
- List of protected grasslands of North America
