= Lake Wauburg =

Lake in the state of Florida, United States

- Lake Wauberg
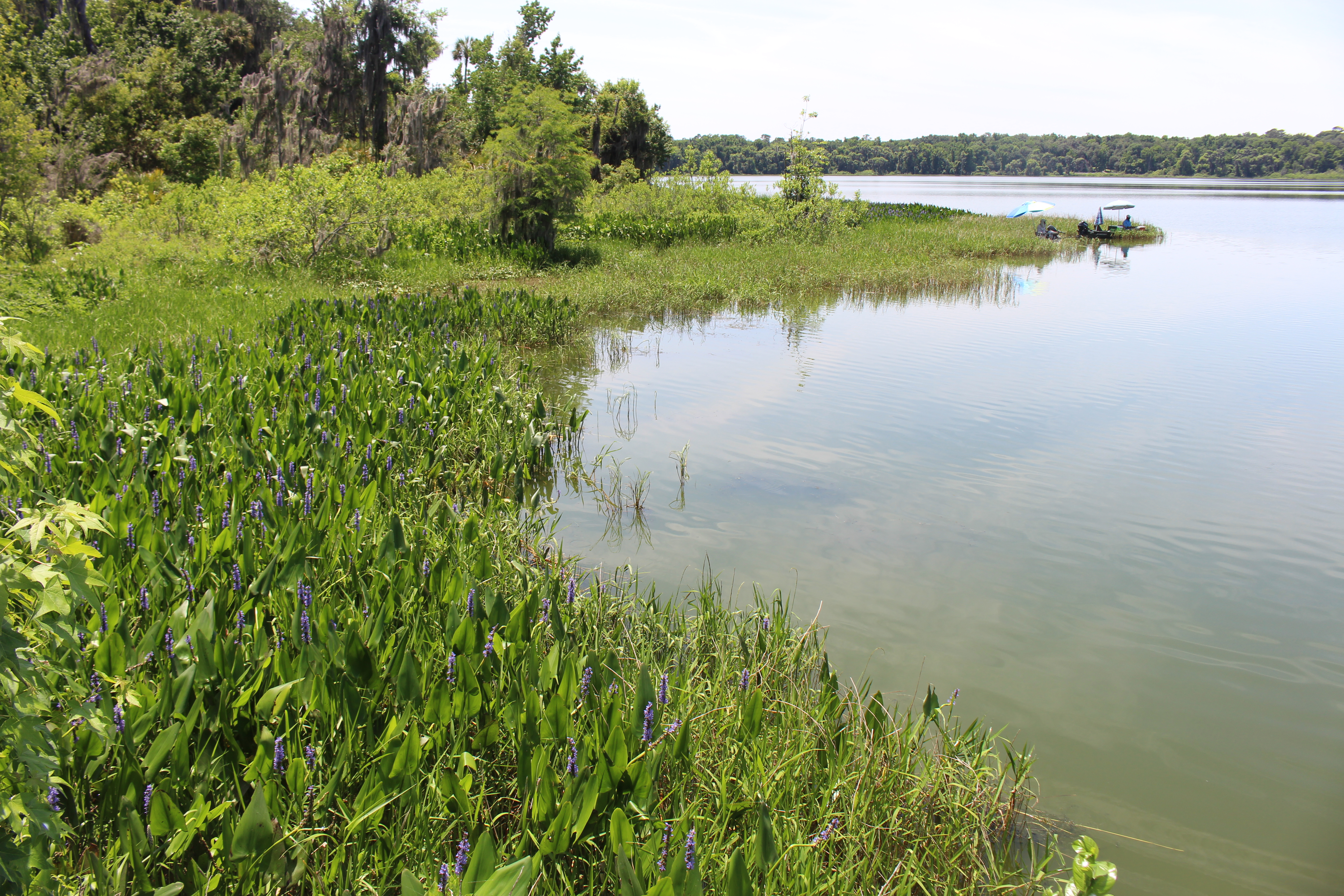
- Lake Wauburg

- Location of Lake Wauburg in Florida
- Location: Alachua County, Florida
- Coordinates: 29.530°N 82.303°W
- Type: lake
- Surface area: 1.6 square kilometres (0.62 mi^{2})
- Max. depth: 3 metres (9.8 ft)
- Shore length^{1}: 5 kilometres (3.1 mi)
- ^{1} Shore length is not a well-defined measure.

Lake Wauburg (sometimes spelled Wauberg) is located just south of Paynes Prairie Preserve State Park in central Alachua County, Florida, United States.

The lake is in the Ocala Uplift District, situated between the forested highlands of the Fairfield Hills area and the surrounding dissolution valleys of the Alachua Prairies.

== Geography ==
Lake Wauburg is irregular in shape, covering 1.6 square kilometres (0.62 mi^{2}) with about 5 kilometres (3.1 mi) of shoreline. The fertile green water supports shad and a deep grass line is good to hold fish. It had a maximum depth of 3 metres (9.8 ft) and offers excellent Black Crappie and Bass fishing.

The lake is adjoined to the east by Sawgrass Pond. A marshy area to the northwest is separated from the lake by a topographic high.

== Lake access ==
The southern edge is boarded by Paynes Prairie Preserve State Park, which allows public access to the lake and a boat launch. Outboard motors are prohibited on the lake but trolling motors and paddle boats are permitted.

=== University of Florida ===
The north end of the Lake is owned by the University of Florida and is operated as a recreation facility for students and faculty.
