= Bivens Arm =

Lake in the state of Florida, United States

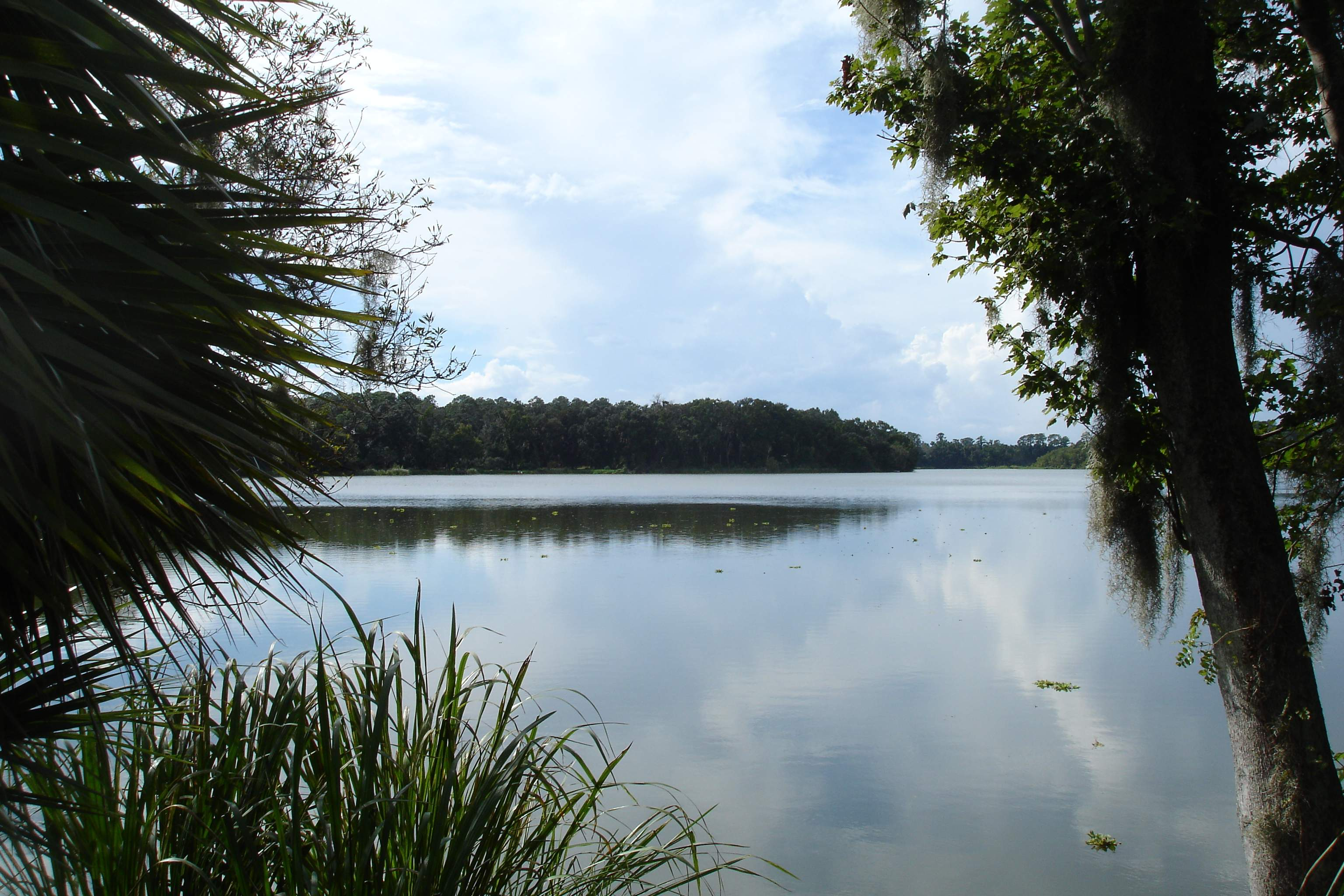

- Location within Florida Location within the United States
- Location: Gainesville, Florida
- Coordinates: 29.62450°N 82.34459°W
- Basin countries: United States

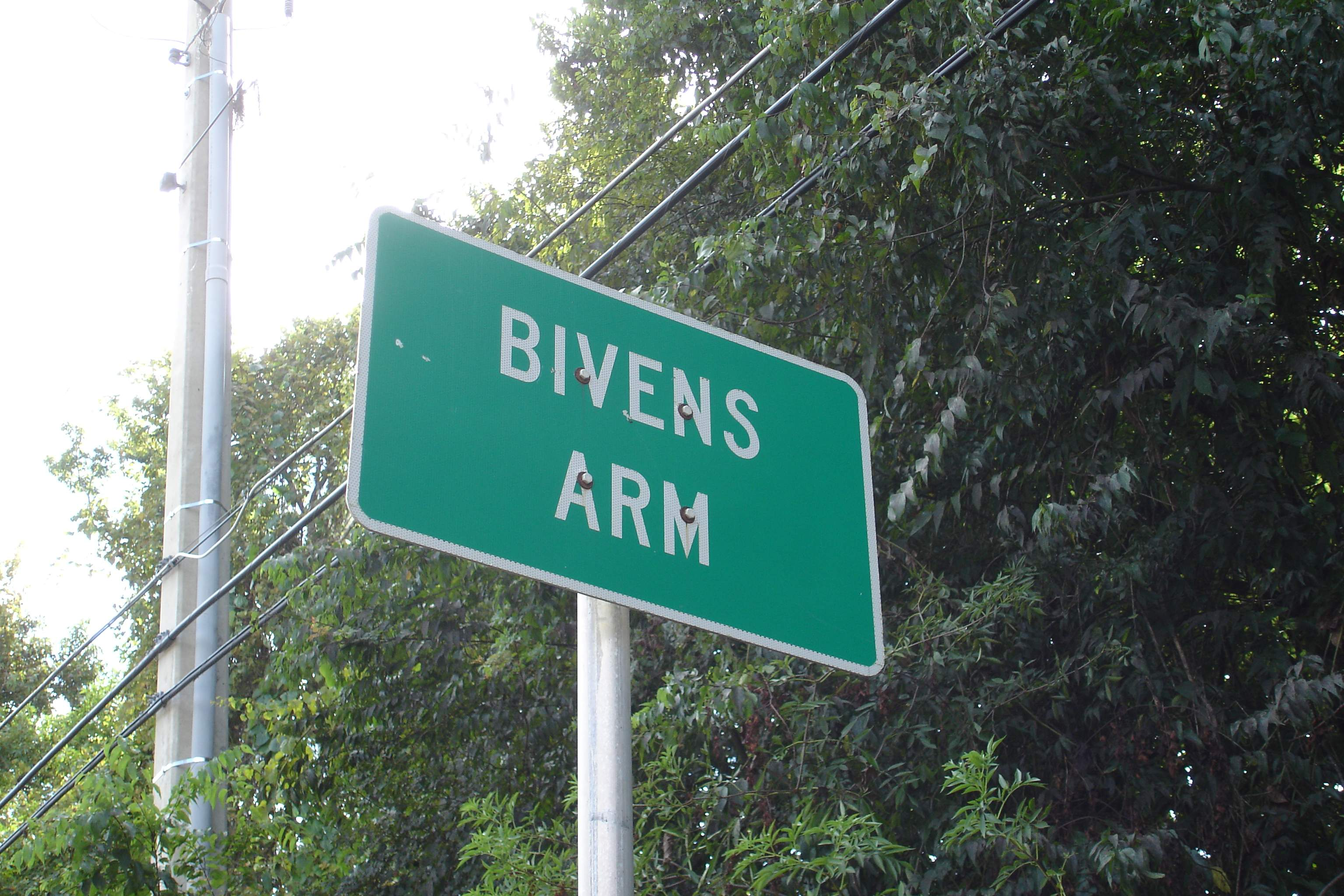
A traffic sign for Bivens Arm.

Bivens Arm is a body of water in Gainesville, Florida. Located west of U.S. Route 441 and south of Archer Road, it is a part of Paynes Prairie. Bivens Arm is a small shallow lake covering approximately 189 acres (76 ha) in southwest Gainesville.

Bivens Arm supports a wide diversity of flora and fauna. Tumblin Creek, which is fed by small springs and seeps, drains into Bivens Arm and is the primary source of drainage into the lake. Bivens Arm overflows onto Paynes Prairie and eventually discharges to the aquifer via Alachua Sink.

== History ==
The early history of Bivens Arm is not well documented given that it is a relatively small body of water. The earliest known use of the land around the lake was as hunting grounds by Native Americans. Beginning in the late 1800s, the land was used mostly for agricultural purposes including cattle ranching, swine farms, vegetable farms, and orange groves.

In the 1930s, Bivens Arm was designated as a bird sanctuary and rookery and even had a resident ranger to care for the sanctuary. In 1965, the state of Florida designated the lake area as a wildlife sanctuary (Bill No. 1356 Chap. 65 1005). In 1981, the City of Gainesville purchased the land between the lake and Williston Road (SR 331) to form the Bivens Arm Nature Park. This park features a lush Live Oak Hammock habitat and marshlands, which periodically become inundated with rising water levels from the lake.
