= Floridian highlands freshwater marsh =

Ecological zone of Florida, US

The Floridian highlands freshwater marsh is a wetland community found on the Florida peninsula. These are upland marshes occurring in shallow peat-filled valleys, the basins of dried lakes, and the borders of existing lakes. The vegetation mosaic includes a range of mostly herbaceous plant communities, varying based on water depth. Deep water supports various submerged and floating plants. Approximately meter-deep supports emergent herbaceous perennials, typically in dense, monospecific stands; species include bulrush (Typha latifolia), pickerelweed (Pontederia cordata), American lotus (Nelumbo lutea). Shallow areas only submerged during wet season support more graminoid vegetation, including maidencane (Panicum hemitomon) and southern cutgrass (Leersia hexandra). Subsurface subsidence and changing drainage patterns make these habitats shift and change over time. Soils can be mucky, loamy, or sandy, but they are generally above permeable subsoils that create standing water much of the year. These marshes may also be called meadows or prairies.

Examples include Paynes Prairie and the marshes along the Kissimmee and St. Johns River.

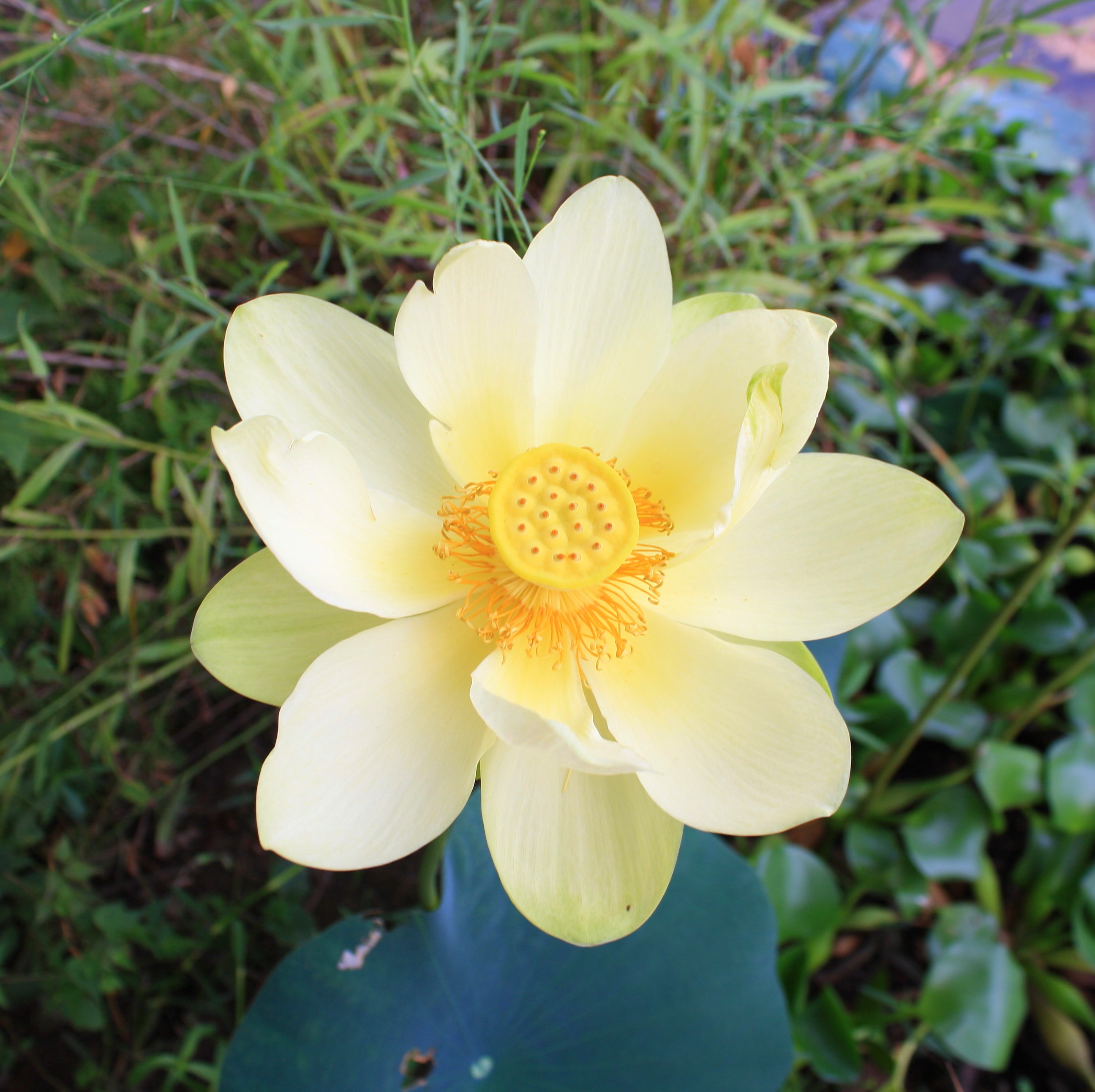
American lotus
