= Morningside Nature Center =

- IUCN category V (protected landscape/seascape)
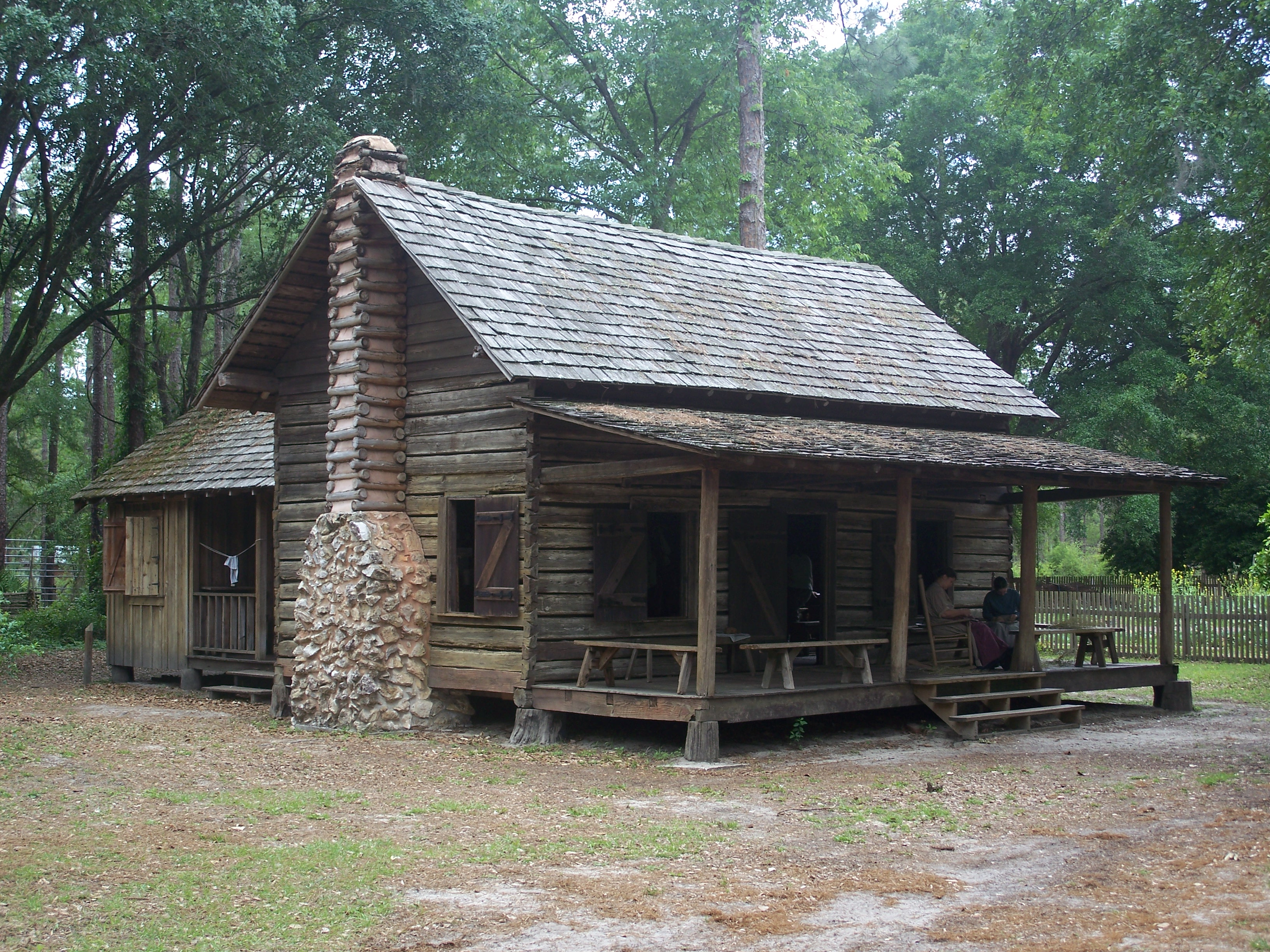
- Farmhouse in the Living History Farm at Morningside Nature Center

- Location within Florida
- Location: Gainesville, Florida
- Coordinates: 29°39′19″N 82°16′26″W
- Area: 416 acres (1.68 km^{2})
- Established: 1970
- Governing body: City of Gainesville

Morningside Nature Center is a 416-acre nature park located in Gainesville, Alachua County in the U.S. state of Florida and overseen by the City of Gainesville. It features a living history farm meant to simulate a North Florida family homestead from the mid to late 1800s. The farm includes an original Florida Cracker cabin built by Irish immigrants around 1840, which was moved to Morningside in 1976. The farm also features a one-room schoolhouse, along with newer farm buildings constructed as authentically as possible and a cash crop field that grows period-appropriate crops like corn, sugarcane, and cotton. The livestock on the farm are heritage breed and period appropriate to the time period. Visitors can view a Jersey cow, Ossabaw Island hogs, Dorking roosters and hens, and Gulf Coast sheep. On the first Saturday of every month September–May, volunteers dress in period attire and teach visitors about rural life in historical Alachua County. The farm is open year-round Monday-Saturday 9 am-4:30 pm, but it is closed on Sundays. Every Wednesday afternoon from 3-4 pm September through May, visitors can visit the farm to participate in the Barnyard Buddies program to feed the animals hay and vegetables provided by park staff. This program is free of charge, but donations of carrots, squash, apples, sweet potatoes, and melons are accepted, however, please give these items to staff and not directly to the animals.

The nature center and education building features live reptiles and amphibians, as well as taxidermy animals for guest viewing, a public restroom and trail maps. The first Friday of each month September through May, the Frogs and Friends program takes place from 2:00 to 3:00 pm in the nature center, free of charge. Behind the nature center, visitors can explore the Timucua village.

Apart from the farm and nature center, Morningside Nature Center also has several miles of hiking trails that traverse through endangered sandhill ecosystems, pine flatwoods, bayhead swamps and cypress domes. In addition to 7 miles of hiking trails, Morningside Nature Center features a public picnic area with restrooms and water fountains, and a covered open-air pavilion which is used for environmental education programs for students on field trips and summer camps and for various other internal events. The pavilion is not available for public use.

Prescribed fire is used to manage the park's sensitive ecosystem. Dogs are not allowed in the park.
