= Florida's 3rd congressional district =

U.S. House district for Florida

Coordinates: 29°50′05″N 82°44′09″W

- Map of district boundaries since January 3, 2023 (Note: The district includes the same census blocks as drawn for the 2020 redistricting cycle in 2022 and during mid-decade redistricting in 2026. As such, boundaries of the district will not change at the 2026 elections.) (Interactive map version)
- Representative: Kat Cammack; R–Gainesville
- Area: 3,844 mi^{2} (9,960 km^{2})
- Distribution: 71.27% urban; 28.73% rural
- Population (2025): 844,388
- Median household income: $63,379
- Ethnicity: 65.0% White; 15.5% Black; 11.6% Hispanic; 4.0% Two or more races; 3.1% Asian; 0.8% other
- Cook PVI: R+10

Florida's 3rd congressional district is an electoral district of the United States House of Representatives located in Florida. It presently comprises a large section of north central Florida, including the entire counties of Alachua, Baker, Bradford, Columbia, Dixie, Gilchrist, Hamilton, Levy, Suwannee, and Union, along with the majority of Lafayette and Marion County. The city of Gainesville is in the district as well as part of Ocala (its northern suburbs), and portions of the Jacksonville metropolitan area.

Redistricting in Florida, effective for the 2012 federal elections, radically altered the nature of the 3rd district. From 1993 through 2012 the district called the 3rd district comprised an entirely different territory, roughly similar to the 5th district as of 2013. Likewise the present territory of the new 3rd district, as of the 2012 elections, is made up of parts of the former 2nd, 4th, 5th, and 6th districts, though it is geographically similar to the pre-2013 6th district. The former 3rd district was an intentionally gerrymandered territory designed to unite disparate areas of northeastern Florida with significant African-American populations into a black-majority district, and was overwhelmingly Democratic in voting patterns.

The new 3rd district has a majority white population, largely in rural areas and small towns. The only cities of any size in the district are Gainesville and Ocala. The district has been represented by Republican Kat Cammack since 2021.

While Florida has had at least three congressional districts since the 1900 U.S. census, the 1993–2012 3rd congressional district dates to reapportionment done by the Florida Legislature after the 1990 U.S. census. Because Florida has a large population of African Americans, but not a large enough concentration anywhere in the state to easily configure a congressional district with a majority, there were several attempts to create a few gerrymandered districts which were certain to elect an African American candidate. This created an odd coalition of black Democrats and Republicans who supported such districts (since this not only created black-majority districts, but also made "safer" Republican districts elsewhere). This effort was opposed by many white Democrats, but eventually, this idea won the support of the state legislature and this district was created as a result.

The 1993–2012 3rd congressional district was geographically diverse. Starting from the southern part of the district, it included the Pine Hills area of the Orlando-Kissimmee Metropolitan Area with small pockets of African-American neighborhoods in the cities of Sanford, Gainesville, Palatka, and finally the larger African American communities of Jacksonville. Connecting these areas were regions that are sparsely populated—either expansive rural areas or narrow strips which are only a few miles wide. Barack Obama received 73% of the vote in this district in the 2008 Presidential election. The old 3rd district was represented from 1993 through 2012 by Corrine Brown, who was elected to the similar new 5th district in the November 2012 elections.

== Voting ==
=== Recent election results from statewide races ===
Year	Office	Results
2008	President	McCain 53% - 46%
2010	Senate	Rubio 52% - 21%
2010	Governor	Scott 52% - 48%
2010	Attorney General	Bondi 54% - 38%
2010	Chief Financial Officer	Atwater 54% - 36%
2012	President	Romney 56% - 44%
2012	Senate	Nelson 53% - 47%
2014	Governor	Scott 55% - 45%
2016	President	Trump 55% - 41%
2016	Senate	Rubio 57% - 39%
2018	Senate	Scott 54% - 45%
2018	Governor	DeSantis 55% - 43%
2018	Attorney General	Moody 58% - 41%
2018	Chief Financial Officer	Patronis 57% - 43%
2020	President	Trump 57% - 42%
2022	Senate	Rubio 62% - 37%
2022	Governor	DeSantis 64% - 35%
2022	Attorney General	Moody 65% - 35%
2022	Chief Financial Officer	Patronis 64% - 36%
2024	President	Trump 60% - 39%
2024	Senate	Scott 60% - 38%

=== Voter registration ===
Current voter registration
as of February 20, 2024
1. Republican (214,307) (45.8%)
2. Democratic (154,334) (33.0%)
3. No Party Affiliation (88,703) (18.9%)

== Composition ==
For the 118th and successive Congresses (based on redistricting following the 2020 census), the district contains all or portions of the following counties and communities:

Alachua County (9)

All 9 communities

Baker County (2)

Macclenny, Glen St. Mary

Bradford County (4)

All 4 communities

Columbia County (4)

All 4 communities

Dixie County (3)

All 3 communities

Gilchrist County (4)

All 4 communities

Hamilton County (3)

All 3 communities

Lafayette County (2)

Day (part; also 2nd), Mayo

Levy County (16)

All 16 communities

Marion County (11)

Dunnellon, McIntosh, Ocala, Ocala Estates, On Top of the World, Rainbow Lakes Estates (shared with Levy County), Liberty Triangle, Marion Oaks, Rainbow Park, Rainbow Springs, Reddick

Suwanne County (2)

Branford, Live Oak

Union County (3)

All 3 communities

== List of members representing the district ==
Member	Party	Years	Cong ress	Electoral history	District location
District created March 4, 1903
William B. Lamar (Monticello)	Democratic	March 4, 1903 – March 3, 1909	58th 59th 60th	Elected in 1902. Re-elected in 1904. Re-elected in 1906. Retired to run for U.S. senator.	
Dannite H. Mays (Monticello)	Democratic	March 4, 1909 – March 3, 1913	61st 62nd	Elected in 1908. Re-elected in 1910. Lost renomination.	
Emmett Wilson (Pensacola)	Democratic	March 4, 1913 – March 3, 1917	63rd 64th	Elected in 1912. Re-elected in 1914. Lost renomination.	
Walter Kehoe (Pensacola)	Democratic	March 4, 1917 – March 3, 1919	65th	Elected in 1916. Lost renomination.	
John H. Smithwick (Pensacola)	Democratic	March 4, 1919 – March 3, 1927	66th 67th 68th 69th	Elected in 1918. Re-elected in 1920. Re-elected in 1922. Re-elected in 1924. Lost renomination.	
Tom Yon (Tallahassee)	Democratic	March 4, 1927 – March 3, 1933	70th 71st 72nd	Elected in 1926. Re-elected in 1928. Re-elected in 1930. Lost renomination.	
Millard Caldwell (Milton)	Democratic	March 4, 1933 – January 3, 1941	73rd 74th 75th 76th	Elected in 1932. Re-elected in 1934. Re-elected in 1936. Re-elected in 1938. Retired to run for U.S. senator.	
Bob Sikes (Crestview)	Democratic	January 3, 1941 – October 19, 1944	77th 78th	Elected in 1940. Re-elected in 1942. Resigned to enter the U.S. Army.	
Vacant		October 19, 1944 – January 3, 1945	78th		
Bob Sikes (Crestview)	Democratic	January 3, 1945 – January 3, 1963	79th 80th 81st 82nd 83rd 84th 85th 86th 87th	Re-elected in November 1944 when the President ordered all legislators on active military duty to return to Washington. Re-elected in 1946. Re-elected in 1948. Re-elected in 1950. Re-elected in 1952. Re-elected in 1954. Re-elected in 1956. Re-elected in 1958. Re-elected in 1960. Redistricted to the 1st district.	
Claude Pepper (Miami)	Democratic	January 3, 1963 – January 3, 1967	88th 89th	Elected in 1962. Re-elected in 1964. Redistricted to the 11th district.	
Charles E. Bennett (Jacksonville)	Democratic	January 3, 1967 – January 3, 1993	90th 91st 92nd 93rd 94th 95th 96th 97th 98th 99th 100th 101st 102nd	Redistricted from the 2nd district and re-elected in 1966. Re-elected in 1968. Re-elected in 1970. Re-elected in 1972. Re-elected in 1974. Re-elected in 1976. Re-elected in 1978. Re-elected in 1980. Re-elected in 1982. Re-elected in 1984. Re-elected in 1986. Re-elected in 1988. Re-elected in 1990. Redistricted to the 4th district and retired.	
Corrine Brown (Jacksonville)	Democratic	January 3, 1993 – January 3, 2013	103rd 104th 105th 106th 107th 108th 109th 110th 111th 112th	Elected in 1992. Re-elected in 1994. Re-elected in 1996. Re-elected in 1998. Re-elected in 2000. Re-elected in 2002. Re-elected in 2004. Re-elected in 2006. Re-elected in 2008. Re-elected in 2010. Redistricted to the 5th district.	1993–2003 [data missing]
Corrine Brown (Jacksonville)	Democratic	January 3, 1993 – January 3, 2013	103rd 104th 105th 106th 107th 108th 109th 110th 111th 112th	Elected in 1992. Re-elected in 1994. Re-elected in 1996. Re-elected in 1998. Re-elected in 2000. Re-elected in 2002. Re-elected in 2004. Re-elected in 2006. Re-elected in 2008. Re-elected in 2010. Redistricted to the 5th district.	2003–2013
Ted Yoho (Gainesville)	Republican	January 3, 2013 – January 3, 2021	113th 114th 115th 116th	Elected in 2012. Re-elected in 2014. Re-elected in 2016. Re-elected in 2018. Retired.	2013–2017
Ted Yoho (Gainesville)	Republican	January 3, 2013 – January 3, 2021	113th 114th 115th 116th	Elected in 2012. Re-elected in 2014. Re-elected in 2016. Re-elected in 2018. Retired.	2017–2023
Kat Cammack (Gainesville)	Republican	January 3, 2021 – present	117th 118th 119th	Elected in 2020. Re-elected in 2022. Re-elected in 2024. Re-elected in 2026.	2017–2023
Kat Cammack (Gainesville)	Republican	January 3, 2021 – present	117th 118th 119th	Elected in 2020. Re-elected in 2022. Re-elected in 2024. Re-elected in 2026.	2023–present

== Recent election results ==
=== 2002 ===
Florida's 3rd Congressional District Election (2002)
Party	Candidate	Votes	%
Democratic	Corrine Brown (Incumbent)	88,462	59.29
Republican	Jennifer Carroll	60,747	40.71
Total votes		149,209	100.00
Turnout			
Democratic hold			

=== 2004 ===
Florida's 3rd Congressional District Election (2004)
Party	Candidate	Votes	%
Democratic	Corrine Brown (Incumbent)	172,833	99.24
No party	Others	1,323	0.76
Total votes		174,156	100.00
Turnout			
Democratic hold			

=== 2006 ===
Florida's 3rd Congressional District Election (2006)
Party	Candidate	Votes	%
Democratic	Corrine Brown (Incumbent)		100.00
Total votes			100.00
Turnout			
Democratic hold			

=== 2008 ===
Florida's 3rd Congressional District Election (2008)
Party	Candidate	Votes	%
Democratic	Corrine Brown (Incumbent)		100.00
Total votes			100.00
Turnout			
Democratic hold			

=== 2010 ===
Florida's 3rd Congressional District Election (2010)
Party	Candidate	Votes	%
Democratic	Corrine Brown (Incumbent)	94,744	63.04
Republican	Mike Yost	50,932	33.89
Independent	Terry Martin-Back	4,625	3.08
Total votes		150,301	100.00
Turnout			
Democratic hold			

=== 2012 ===
Florida's 3rd Congressional District Election (2012)
Party	Candidate	Votes	%
Republican	Ted Yoho	204,331	64.7
Democratic	Jacques Rene Gaillot Jr.	102,468	32.5
Independent	Philip Dodds	8,870	2.8
Independent	Michael Ricks	0	0
Total votes		315,669	100.00
Turnout			
Republican gain from Democratic			

=== 2014 ===
Florida's 3rd Congressional District Election (2014)
Party	Candidate	Votes	%
Republican	Ted Yoho (Incumbent)	148,691	65.0
Democratic	Marihelen Wheeler	73,910	32.3
Independent	Howard Lawson	6,208	2.7
Total votes		228,809	100.00
Turnout			
Republican hold			

=== 2016 ===
Florida's 3rd Congressional District Election (2016)
Party	Candidate	Votes	%
Republican	Ted Yoho (Incumbent)	193,843	56.6
Democratic	Kenneth McGurn	136,338	39.8
Independent	Tom Wells	12,519	3.7
Total votes		342,700	100.00
Turnout			
Republican hold			

=== 2018 ===
Florida's 3rd Congressional District Election (2018)
Party	Candidate	Votes	%
Republican	Ted Yoho (Incumbent)	176,616	57.6
Democratic	Yvonne Hayes Hinson	129,880	42.4
Total votes		306,496	100.00
Turnout			
Republican hold			

=== 2020 ===
2020 United States House of Representatives elections in Florida
Party	Candidate	Votes	%
Republican	Kat Cammack	223,075	57.14%
Democratic	Adam Christensen	167,326	42.86%
Total votes		390,401	100.0
Republican hold			

=== 2022 ===
2022 United States House of Representatives elections in Florida
Party	Candidate	Votes	%
Republican	Kat Cammack (Incumbent)	178,101	62.5%
Democratic	Danielle Hawk	103,382	36.3%
No party	Linda Brooks	3,410	1.2%
Total votes		284,893	100.0
Republican hold			

=== 2024 ===
2024 United States House of Representatives elections in Florida
Party	Candidate	Votes	%
Republican	Kat Cammack (incumbent)	241,174	61.61
Democratic	Tom Wells	150,283	38.39
Total votes		391,457	100.00
Republican hold			
