= McIntosh Historic District =

Historic district in Florida, United States

- U.S. National Register of Historic Places
- U.S. Historic district
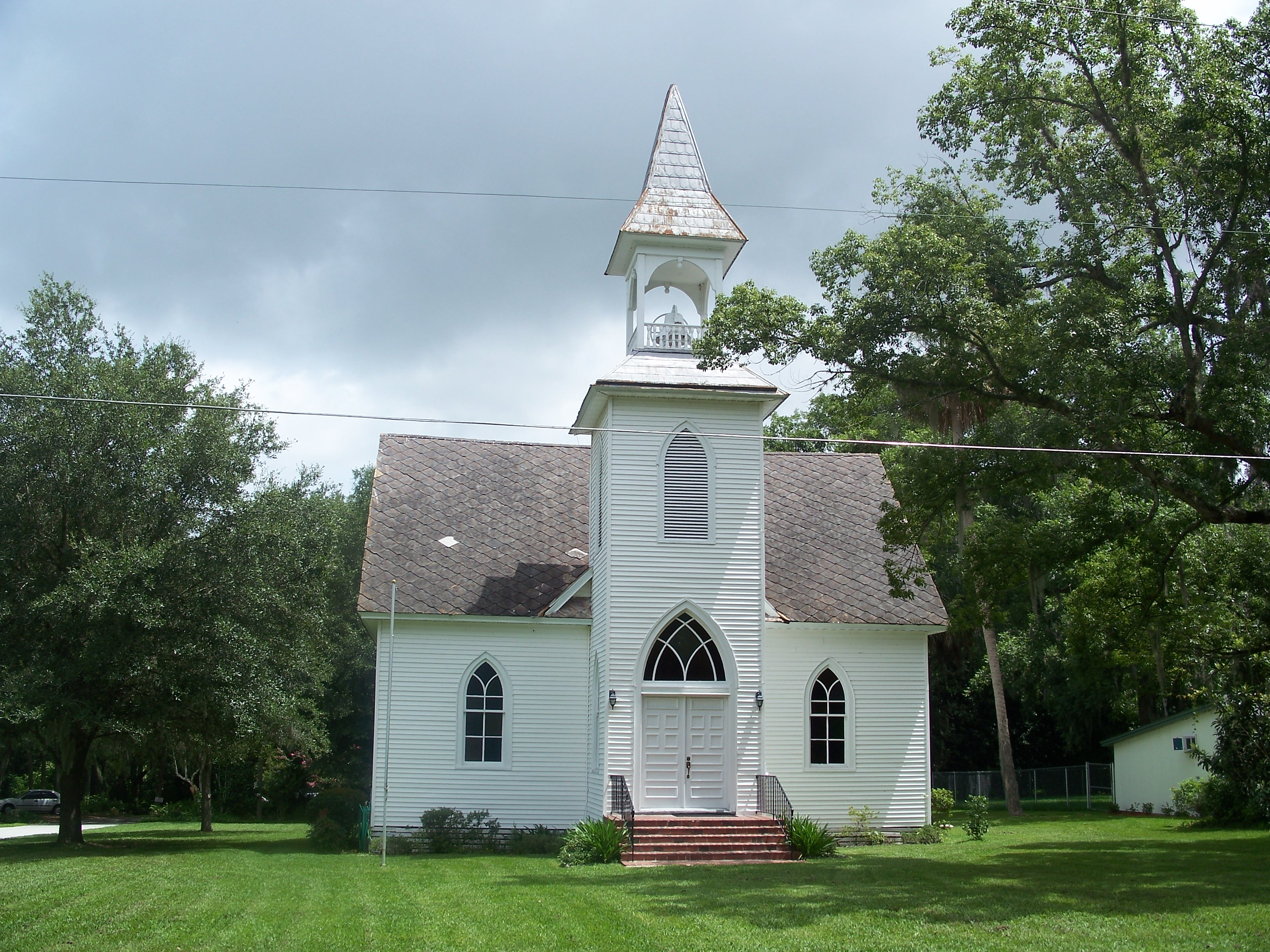
- One of the historic churches in the district

- Location within Florida Location within the United States
- Location: McIntosh, Florida
- Coordinates: 29°26′57″N 82°13′11″W
- Area: 94 acres (380,000 m^{2})
- NRHP reference No.: 83003550
- Added to NRHP: November 18, 1983

The McIntosh Historic District is a U.S. historic district (designated as such on November 18, 1983) located in McIntosh, Florida. The district is bounded by the former Atlantic Coast Line Railroad High Springs—Croom Line Right-of-Way, 10th Street, Avenues C and H. It contains 75 buildings. Contributing properties in the district include the McIntosh Presbyterian Church.

Though the Seaboard Coast Line Railroad abandoned the railroad line by 1982, both the passenger station and freight station still exist as contributing properties. U.S. Route 441 runs directly through the district one block east of 10th Street.
