= McIntosh Presbyterian Church =

Historic church in McIntosh, Florida

Coordinates: 29.4502488°N 82.2198201°W

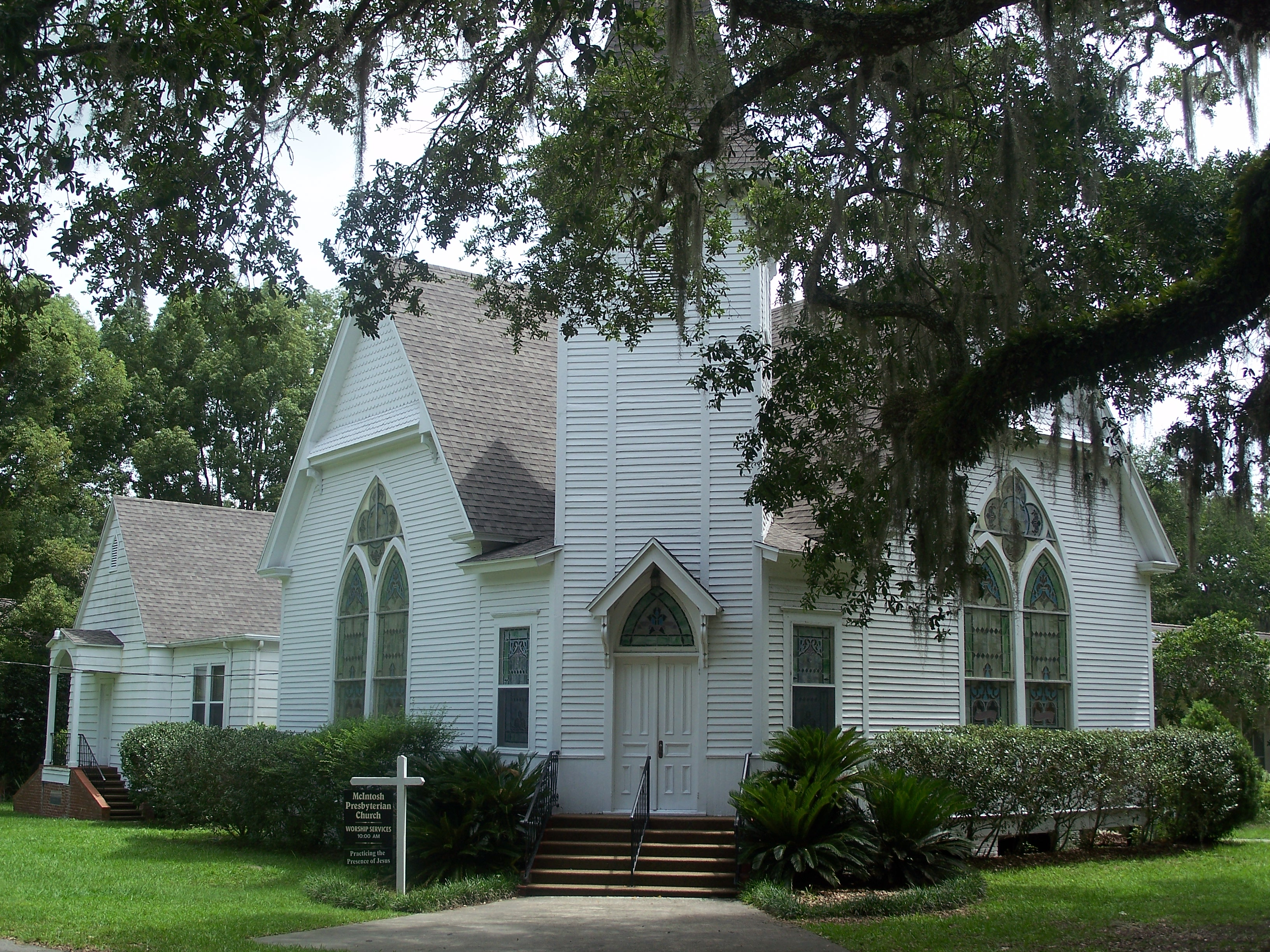
- McIntosh Presbyterian Church
- Interactive map of the McIntosh Presbyterian Church area

General information
- Architectural style: Carpenter Gothic
- Location: McIntosh, Florida, United States
- Construction started: 1907
- Completed: 1907
- Client: Center Point Church

Technical details
- Structural system: wooden

The McIntosh Presbyterian Church is an historic Carpenter Gothic style Presbyterian church located at 5825 Avenue F, corner of 7th Street, in McIntosh, Florida, in the United States. The church was founded in 1885 as Center Point Church and the present building was built in 1907 and its name was changed to McIntosh Presbyterian Church on November 11, 1908. The church has gabled sidewalls facing each street. Each of these sidewalls features a large triptych lancet window. The main entrance is in a corner-facing bell tower set a 45-degree angle to the sidewalls.

In 1989, the McIntosh Presbyterian Church was listed in A Guide to Florida's Historic Architecture, published by the University of Florida Press. It is also a contributing property in the McIntosh Historic District.

McIntosh Presbyterian Church is still an active church in the Presbytery of St. Augustine. Thomas Lane is currently its Commissioned Lay Pastor.
