= Tim Hicks (disambiguation) =

Tim Hicks (born 1979) is a Canadian singer-songwriter.

Tim Hicks may also refer to:

- Tim Hicks (politician) (born 1963), American politician
- Tim Hicks (American football) (born 1979), American football player
