= Lake Weir High School =

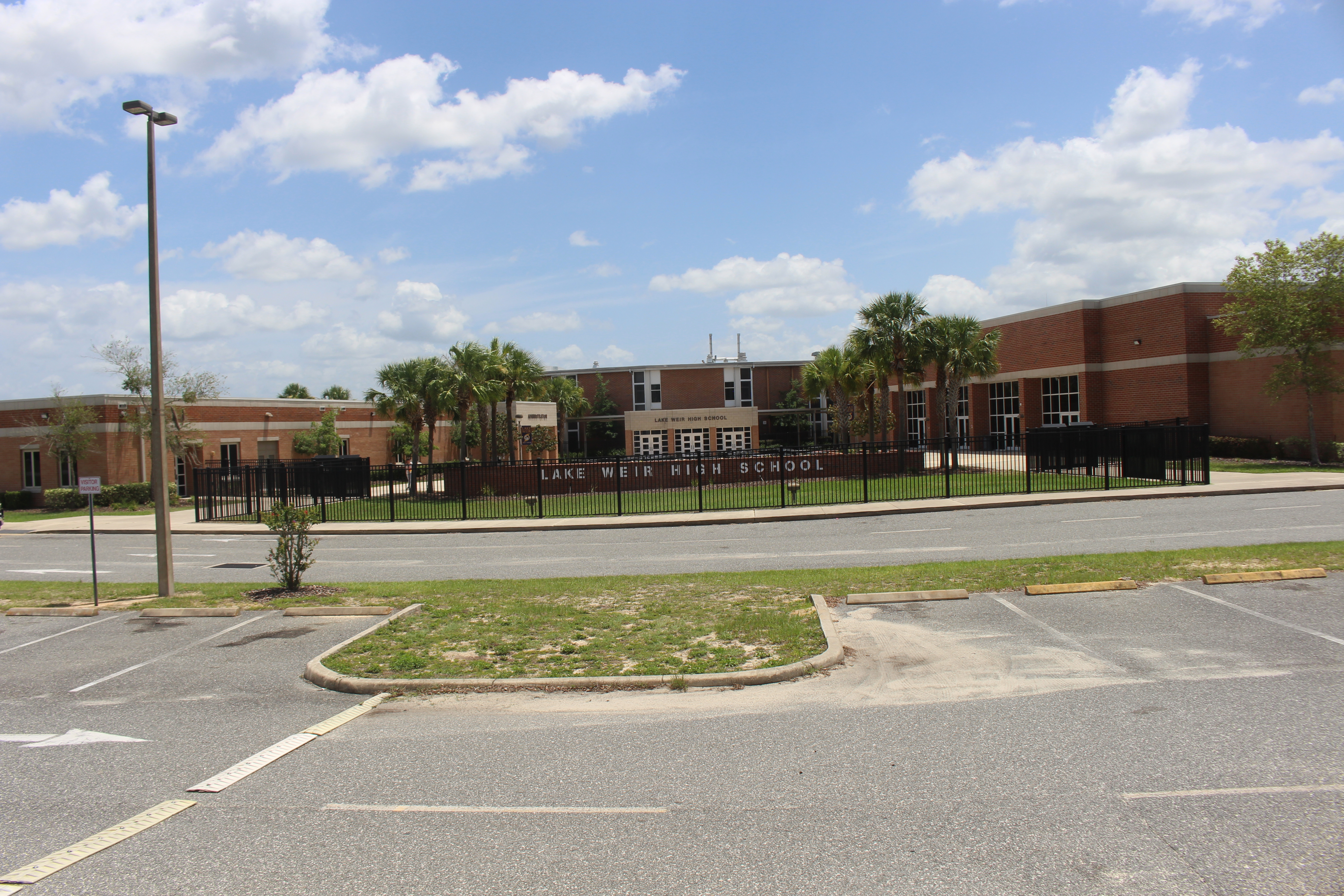

Location
- 10351 SE Maricamp Road; Ocala, Marion County, Florida 34472; United States; 29.07846°N 81.979227°W

Information
- School type: Public high school
- Established: 1955
- Status: Open
- School district: Marion County Public Schools
- CEEB code: 101645
- Principal: Jason Jacobs
- Teaching staff: 64.00 (FTE)
- Grades: 9–12
- Enrollment: 1,426 (2023-2024)
- Student to teacher ratio: 22.28
- Colors: Purple and Gold
- Team name: Hurricanes

Lake Weir High School (LWHS) is a public high school located in unincorporated southeastern Marion County, Florida, United States. It is part of the Marion County School District and serves students residing in southeastern Marion County, including the Ocala National Forest, Silver Springs Shores and Summerfield. The school colors are purple and gold and its mascot is the hurricane.

Lake Weir High School was established in 1955 as a consolidation of Weirsdale and Summerfield High Schools on a hill overlooking Lake Weir with a student body of about 300 students in grades 7 through 12. Mr. Leo Armstrong, former principal of Weirsdale High School was the first principal. The school served students coming from elementary schools at Belleview, Florida, Summerfield, Florida and Weirsdale, Florida that served the communities of Belleview, Candler, East Lake Weir, Ocklawaha, Pedro, Summerfield, Sunset Harbor, and Weirsdale. The first class of 1956 graduated 33. In 1967, Marion County changed to the elementary, middle and high school organization and the school changed to grades 9 through 12. In August, 1975, a new Lake Weir High School was constructed on Maricamp Road in Candler with a student body in excess of 1200 students, which grew to 2500 by 1993. The former Lake Weir High School campus then became home to Lake Weir Middle School, which serves grades 6 through 8.

== Notable alumni ==
- Tim Hicks, gridiron football player
- Eddie L. Johnson, professional basketball player
- Lee Graham, professional baseball player
- Frank Johnson, professional basketball player
- Ted Potter Jr. (class of 2002), PGA Tour golfer, two-time PGA Tour winner
- Grace Daley, WNBA player
- Gina Tuttle, actress and voice-over artist
