= Marion Tech =

Marion Tech or Marion Technical may refer to:

- Marion Technical College, a technical college in Marion, Ohio, United States
- Marion Technical Institute, a vocational school in Ocala, Florida, United States
