= Lake Kerr, Florida =

- Census-designated place
- Location within Florida Location within the United States
- Coordinates: 29°22′42″N 81°45′48″W
- Country: United States
- State: Florida
- County: Marion

Area
  - Total: 16.57 sq mi (42.91 km^{2})
  - Land: 9.87 sq mi (25.57 km^{2})
  - Water: 6.69 sq mi (17.33 km^{2})
- Elevation: 23 ft (7.0 m)

Population (2020)
  - Total: 1,843
  - Density: 186.7/sq mi (72.07/km^{2})
- Time zone: UTC-5 (Eastern (EST))
  - Summer (DST): UTC-4 (EDT)
- ZIP Code: 32134 (Fort McCoy)
- Area code: 352
- FIPS code: 12-38238
- GNIS feature ID: 2812664

Lake Kerr is an unincorporated community and census-designated place (CDP) in northeastern Marion County, Florida, United States, surrounding the lake of the same name. It is 30 miles (48 km) northeast of Ocala, the Marion county seat, and 25 miles (40 km) southwest of Palatka.

Lake Kerr was first listed as a CDP for the 2020 census, at which time the population was 1,843. It is part of the Ocala, Florida Metropolitan Statistical Area.

== Demographics ==
Historical population
Census	Pop.	Note	%±
2020	1,843		—
U.S. Decennial Census

Lake Kerr first appeared as a census designated place in the 2020 U.S. census.

=== 2020 census ===
As of the 2020 census, Lake Kerr had a population of 1,843. The median age was 61.7 years. 11.3% of residents were under the age of 18 and 41.3% of residents were 65 years of age or older. For every 100 females there were 96.5 males, and for every 100 females age 18 and over there were 96.5 males age 18 and over.

0.0% of residents lived in urban areas, while 100.0% lived in rural areas.

There were 929 households in Lake Kerr, of which 11.4% had children under the age of 18 living in them. Of all households, 42.7% were married-couple households, 23.4% were households with a male householder and no spouse or partner present, and 26.4% were households with a female householder and no spouse or partner present. About 39.1% of all households were made up of individuals and 24.9% had someone living alone who was 65 years of age or older.

There were 1,521 housing units, of which 38.9% were vacant. The homeowner vacancy rate was 3.2% and the rental vacancy rate was 18.2%.

Racial composition as of the 2020 census
Race	Number	Percent
White	1,708	92.7%
Black or African American	2	0.1%
American Indian and Alaska Native	11	0.6%
Asian	4	0.2%
Native Hawaiian and Other Pacific Islander	2	0.1%
Some other race	14	0.8%
Two or more races	102	5.5%
Hispanic or Latino (of any race)	38	2.1%
