= Belleview High School =

Public school in Belleview, Florida, United States

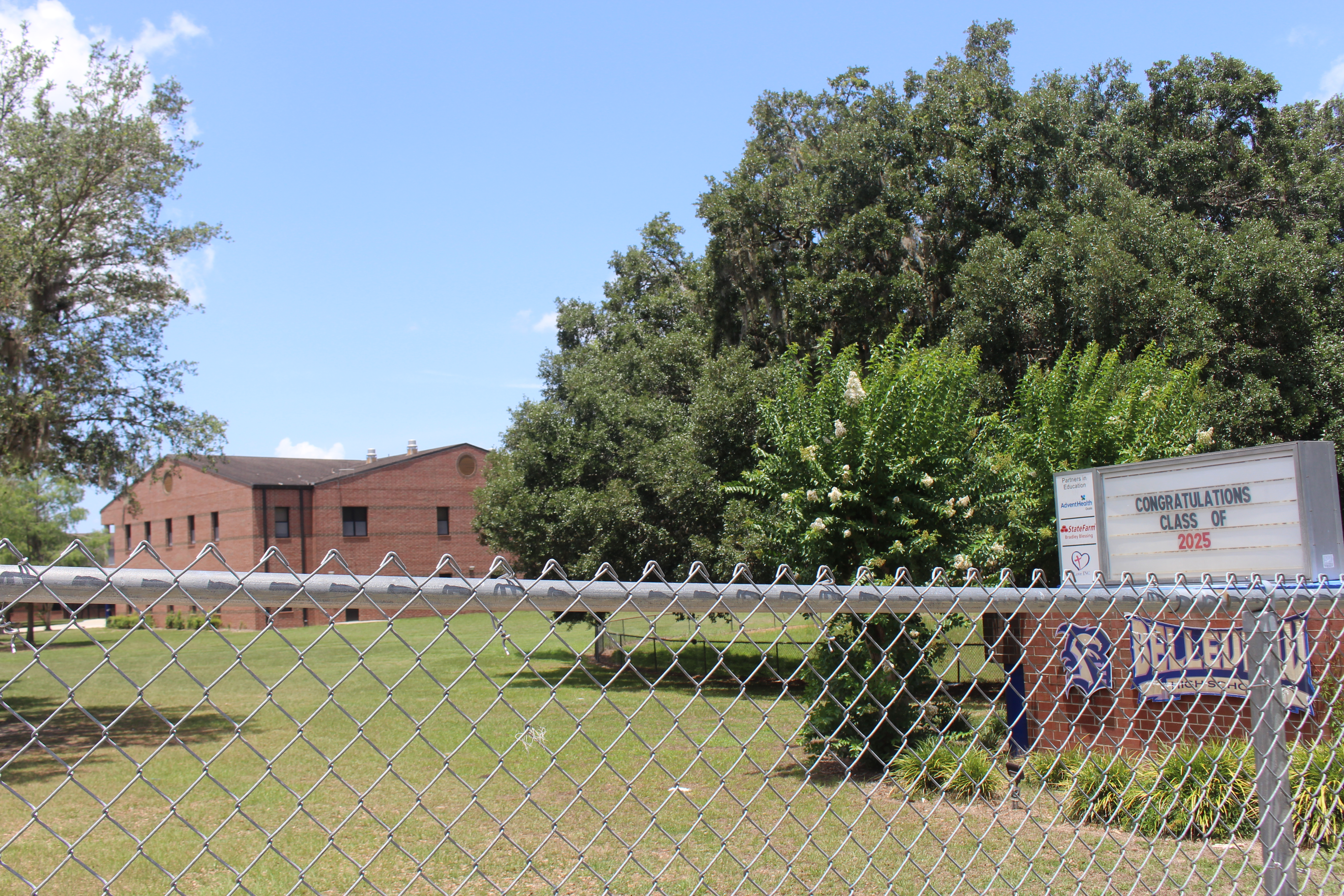

Location
- 10400 SE 36th Avenue; Belleview, Marion County, FL; United States; 29.071206°N 82.086764°W

Information
- School type: Public, Secondary
- Established: 1995
- School district: Marion County Public Schools
- Principal: Heather Guest
- Teaching staff: 76.00 (FTE)
- Grades: 9 through 12
- Gender: Coeducational
- Enrollment: 1,904 (2024-2025)
- Student to teacher ratio: 24.14
- Colors: Blue, Silver, and White
- Mascot: Diamondback Rattlesnake
- Accreditation: Florida Department of Education Southern Association of Colleges and Schools (SACS) Cambridge International Centre (CIE)
- Website: https://bhs.marionschools.net/

Belleview High School is a school located in Belleview, FL. It serves the Belleview area and the southern part of Marion County, Florida. The school mascot is the Eastern Diamondback Rattlesnake, and the school colors are blue, silver, and white. The school offers an Advanced International Certificate of Education (AICE) program. The 80-acre (320,000 m^{2}) campus has a stadium with seating for 2,000 people and a Gymnasium capable of holding 1,400 spectators.

== History ==
Belleview High School (BHS) is located in a rural area just west of US Highway 441, ten miles south of Ocala. Currently, it serves over 1,700 students. The racial composition of the community is predominantly white (63%), with approximately 8% African American, 23% Hispanic, .5% Asian, and 7.8% Multiracial.

BHS operates on a 6 class per day schedule, with exceptions for Thursday and Friday. This entails 6 classes for Monday, Tuesday and Wednesday, but on Thursday classes are twice as long and only cover the 1st, 3rd and 5th classes in a student's schedule. On Friday the process is similar but with the 2nd, 4th and 6th classes. This address CIM strategies by department developed plans and assess the skills by the district calendar.

In 2006, BHS was awarded an Innovation Fair Grant to be used to plan for the expansion of academies to include all BHS students. In addition to academies, BHS offers dual enrollment programs, Advanced International Certificate of Education (AICE) courses, and a General Educational Development (GED) program.

== Notable alumni ==
- Megan Boone, actress
