= Marion County Public Schools =

Public school district in Florida, US

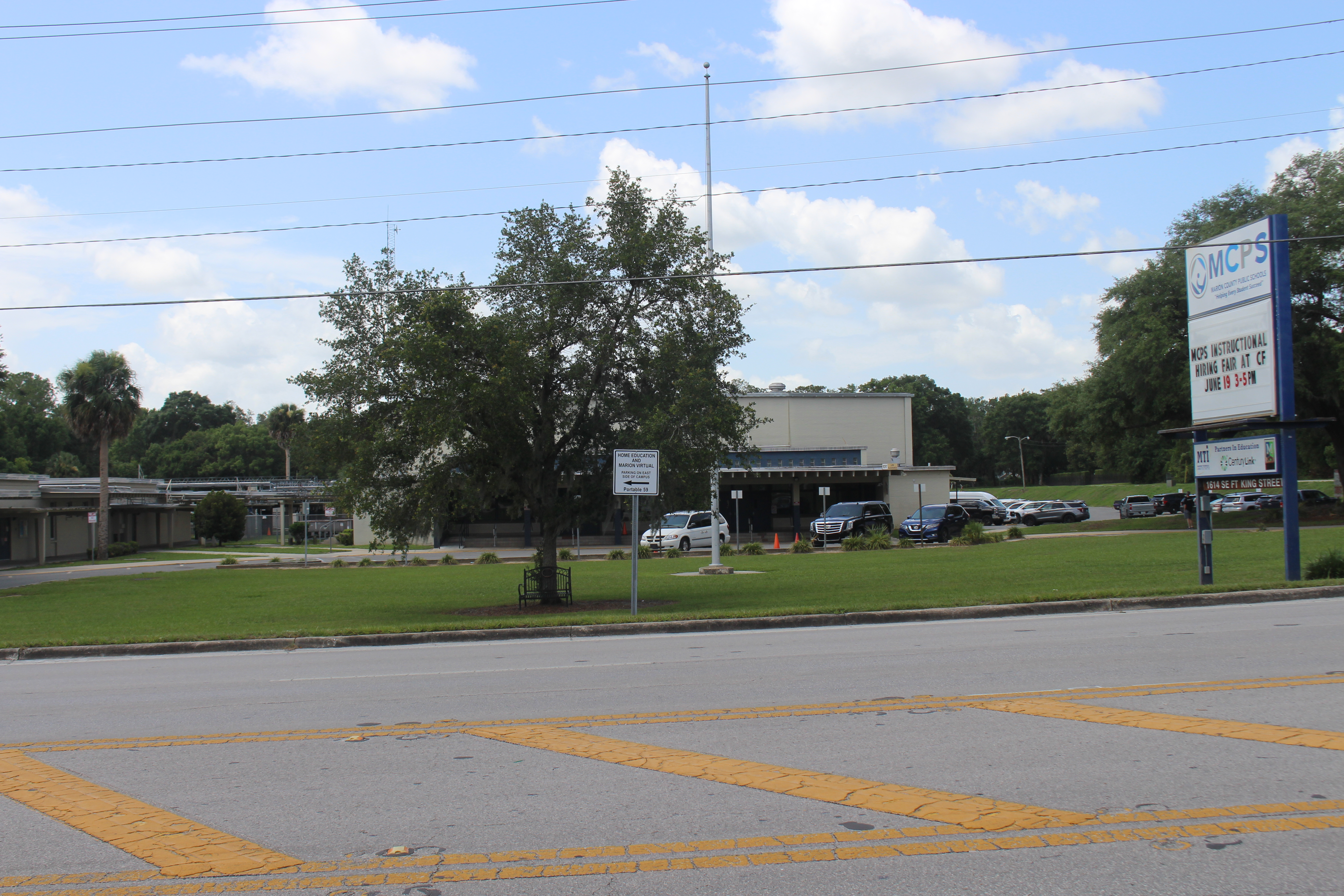
- District headquarters

Address
- 1614 East Fort King Street Ocala, Florida; United States

District information
- Motto: Helping Every Student Succeed
- Grades: Pre-K−12; Adult Education
- Established: 1869
- Superintendent: Danielle Brewer
- Schools: 58
- Budget: $1,335,838,990 (2024-2025)
- NCES District ID: 1201260

Students and staff
- Students: 46,250
- Staff: 6,000

Other information
- Website: www.marionschools.net

Marion County Public Schools (MCPS) is a public school district that covers Marion County, Florida. The district has its headquarters in Ocala, Florida.

== History ==
Diane Gullett, in March 2025, resigned, with that in place on July 11, 2025. In April 2025, the board picked Danielle Brewer as the interim superintendent. On February 24, 2026, the board of trustees voted to make Miller a full superintendent, effective the following day.

== School Board ==
- District 1: Allison Campbell
- District 2: Lori Conrad (Vice-Chair)
- District 3: Eric Cummings
- District 4: Nancy Thrower (Chair)
- District 5: Sarah James

== Schools ==
=== Higher Education School ===
- Marion Technical College

=== High Schools ===
- Belleview High School
- Dunnellon High School
- Forest High School
- Hillcrest School (6-12)
- Lake Weir High School
- Marion Technical Institute
- North Marion High School
- Vanguard High School
- West Port High School

Catboy high

=== Middle Schools ===
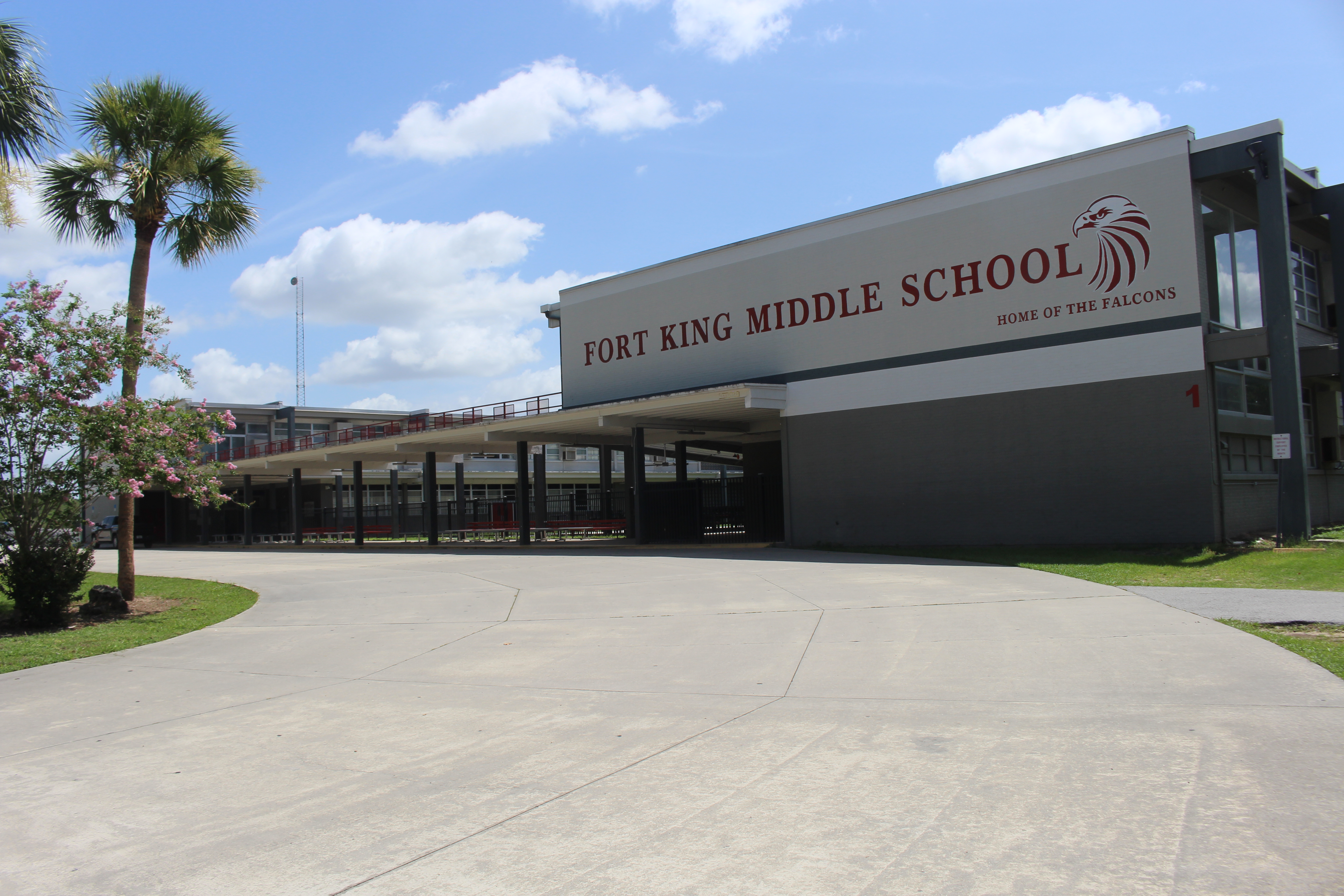
Fort King Middle School

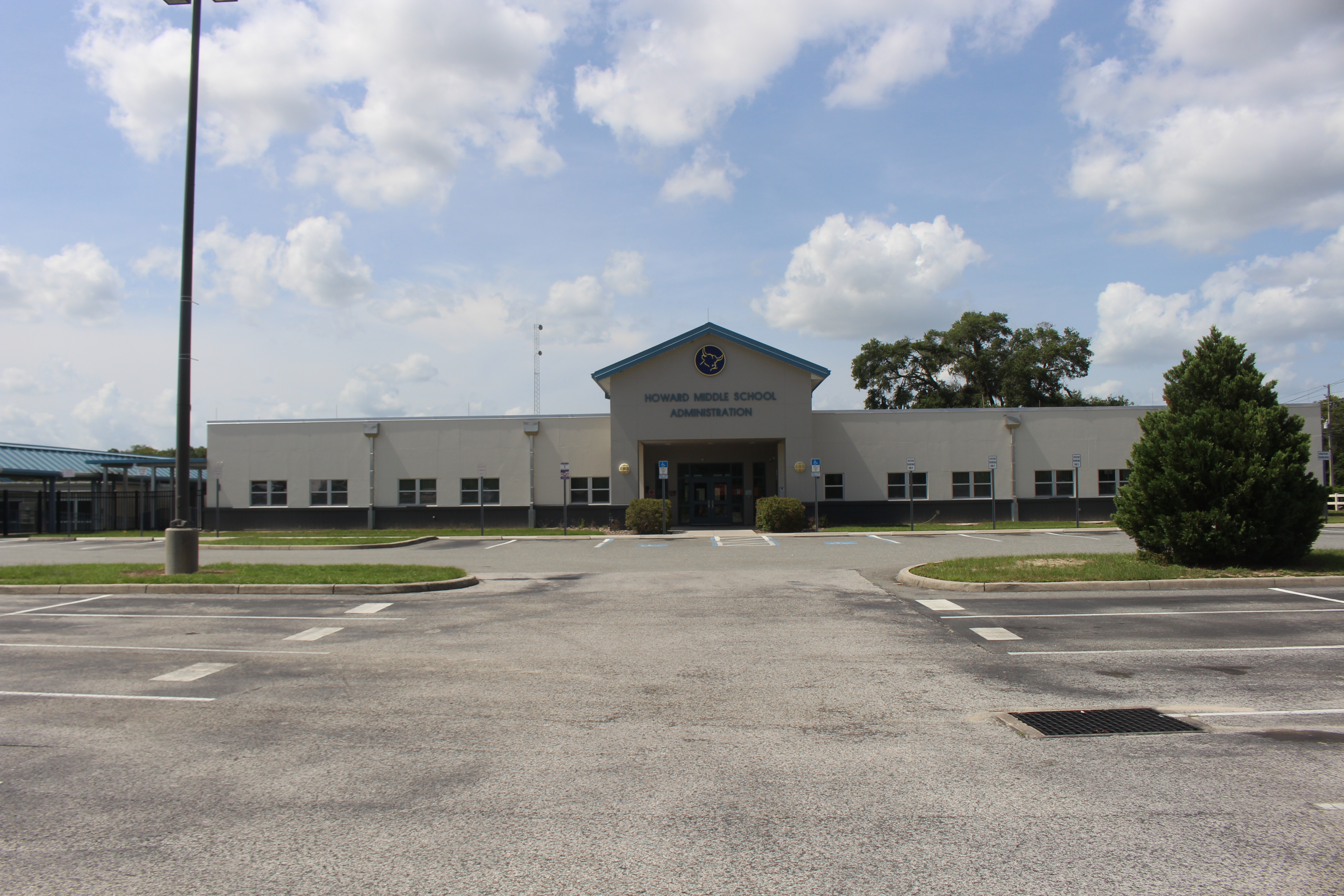
Howard Middle School

- Belleview Middle School
- Dunnellon Middle School
- Fort King Middle School
- Fort McCoy School (K-8)
- Horizon Academy at Marion Oaks
- Howard Middle School
- Lake Weir Middle School
- Liberty Middle School
- North Marion Middle School
- Osceola Middle School

=== Elementary Schools ===
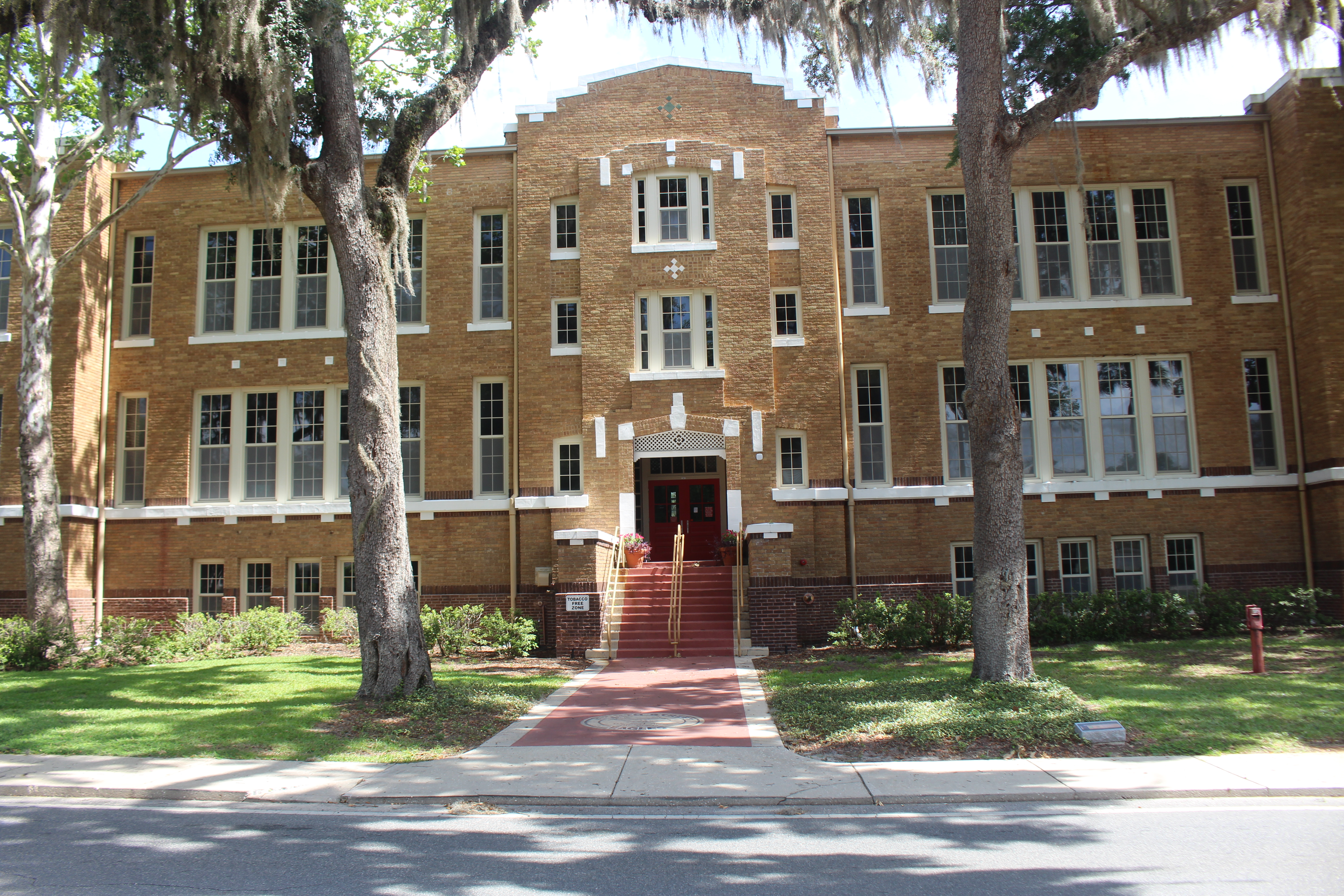
Eighth Street Elementary School

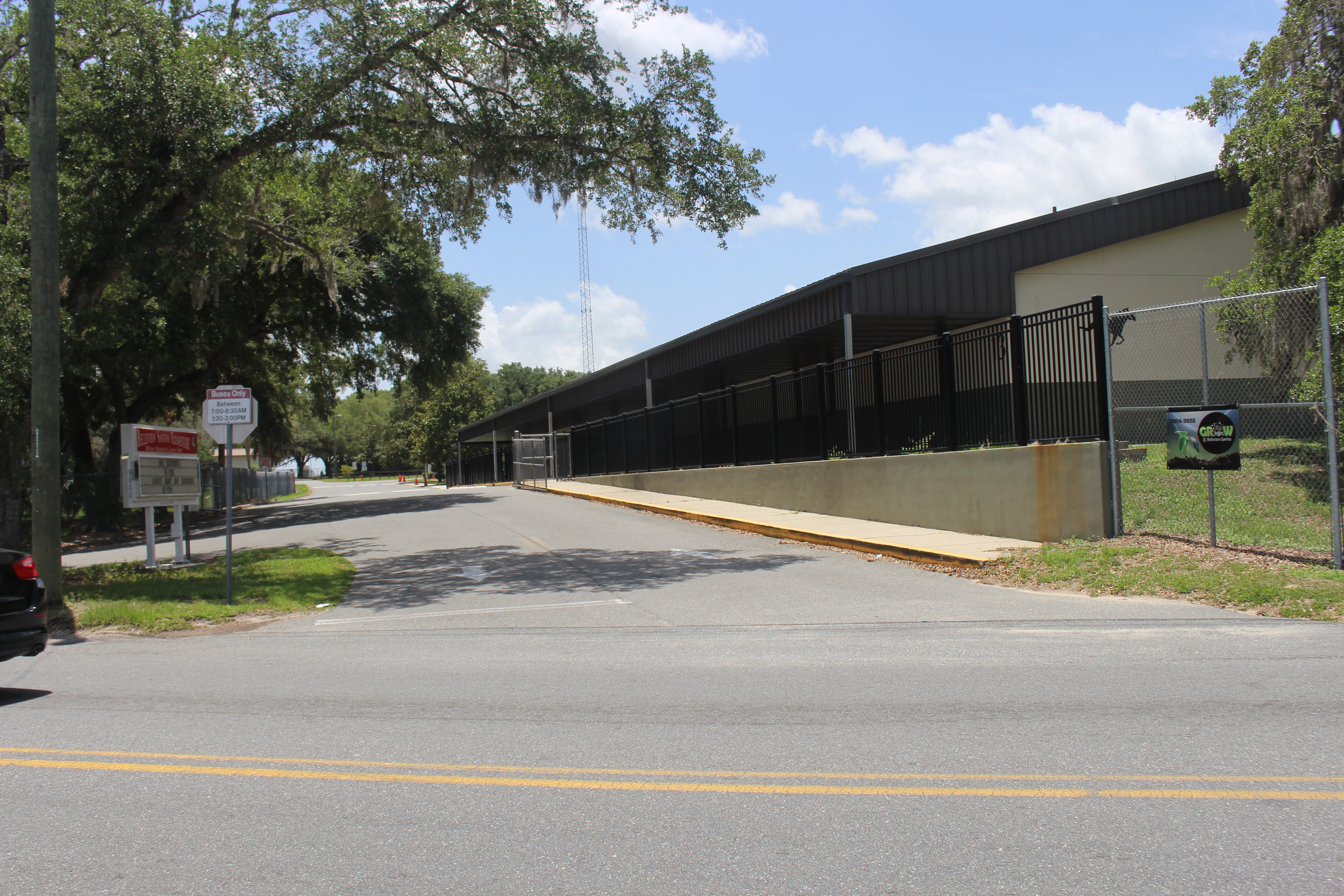
Belleview-Santos Elementary School

- Anthony Elementary School
- Belleview Elementary School
- Belleview-Santos Elementary School
- College Park Elementary School
- Dr. N.H. Jones Elementary
- Dunnellon Elementary School
- East Marion Elementary School
- Eighth Street Elementary School
- Emerald Shores Elementary School
- Fessenden Elementary School
- Fordham Early Learning Academy
- Fort McCoy School (K-8)
- Greenway Elementary School
- Hammett Bowen Elementary School
- Harbour View Elementary School
- Legacy Elementary School
- Madison Street Academy
- Maplewood Elementary School
- Marion Oaks Elementary School
- Oakcrest Elementary School
- Ocala Springs Elementary School
- Reddick-Collier Elementary School
- Romeo Elementary School
- Ross Prairie Elementary
- Saddlewood Elementary School
- Shady Hill Elementary School
- South Ocala Elementary School
- Sparr Elementary School
- Stanton-Weirsdale Elementary School
- Sunrise Elementary School
- Ward-Highlands Elementary School
- Winding Oaks Elementary
- Wyomina Park Elementary School

=== Charter Schools ===
- Ina A. Colen Academy
- Marion Charter School
- McIntosh Charter School
- Ocali Charter High School
- Ocali Charter Middle School

=== Virtual Schools ===
- Marion E-learning
- Marion Virtual

=== Former schools ===
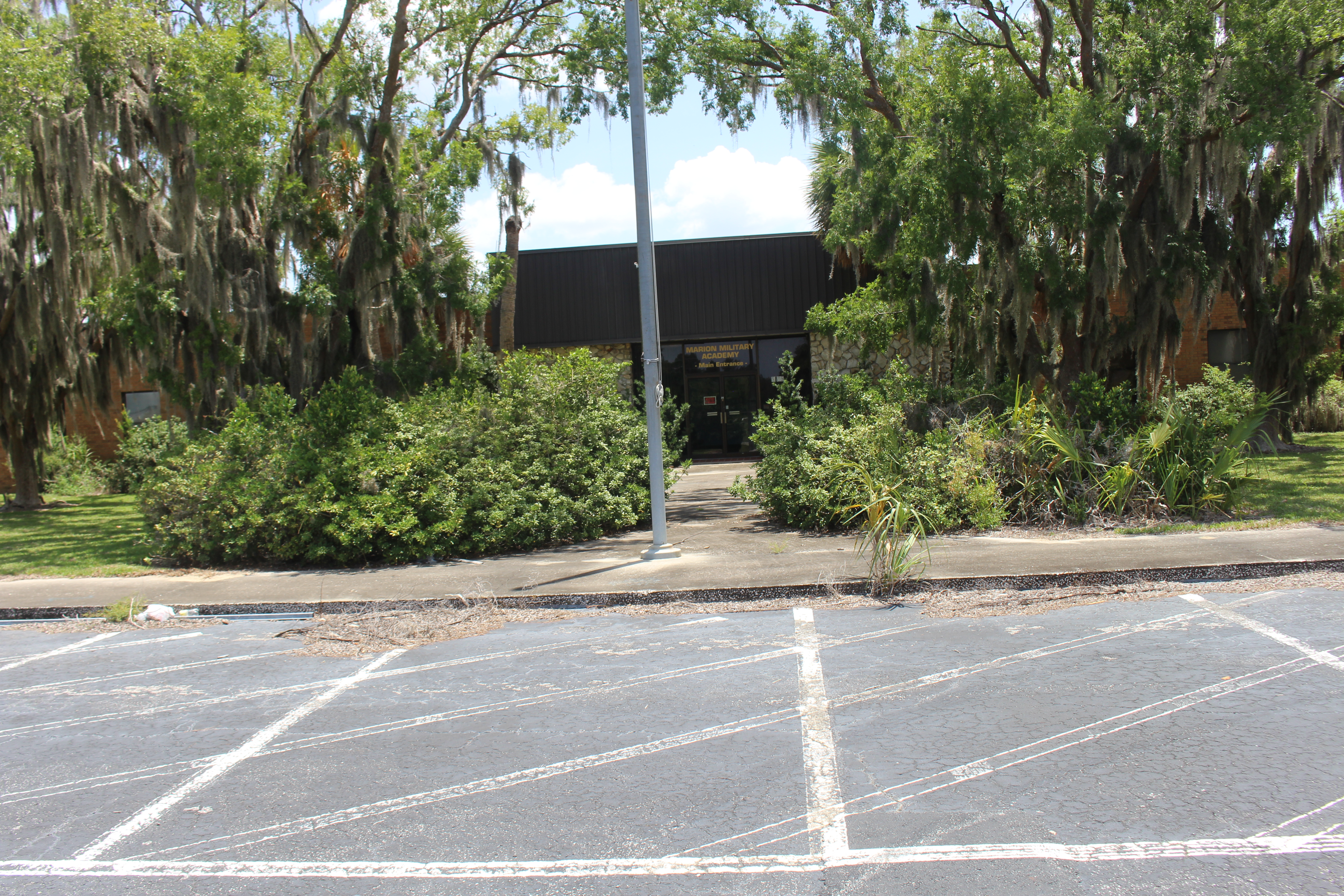
Marion Military Academy

- Evergreen Elementary School - In 2007 the school was ranked "A" by the Florida Department of Education, but its rankings declined after that. After 2009 the school never received a "B" ranking again, and it received "F" grades each year from 2013 until its closure. In May 2021, the school board voted to have the school close, with three choosing closure and two voting against. At the end, the school's enrollment was around 200.

There was a charter school called Marion Military Academy, earlier Francis Marion Military Academy, that closed in 2019.
