= Lake Kerr =

Lake in Florida, United States

- Churchill Lake
- Location within Florida Location within the United States
- Location: Marion County, Florida
- Coordinates: 29°21′22″N 81°46′26″W
- Surface elevation: 20 feet (6.1 m)
- Settlements: Kerr City, Florida

Lake Kerr is a small lake located in Marion County, Florida, USA. Eureka and Salt Springs are located near Lake Kerr. It is also located very close to Lake George and the St. Johns River. The water is clear like many lakes found in Florida. The census-designated place of Lake Kerr surrounds the water body.

The lake bears the name of R. B. Kerr, a surveyor.
