= Marion County, Florida =

County in Florida, United States

- County
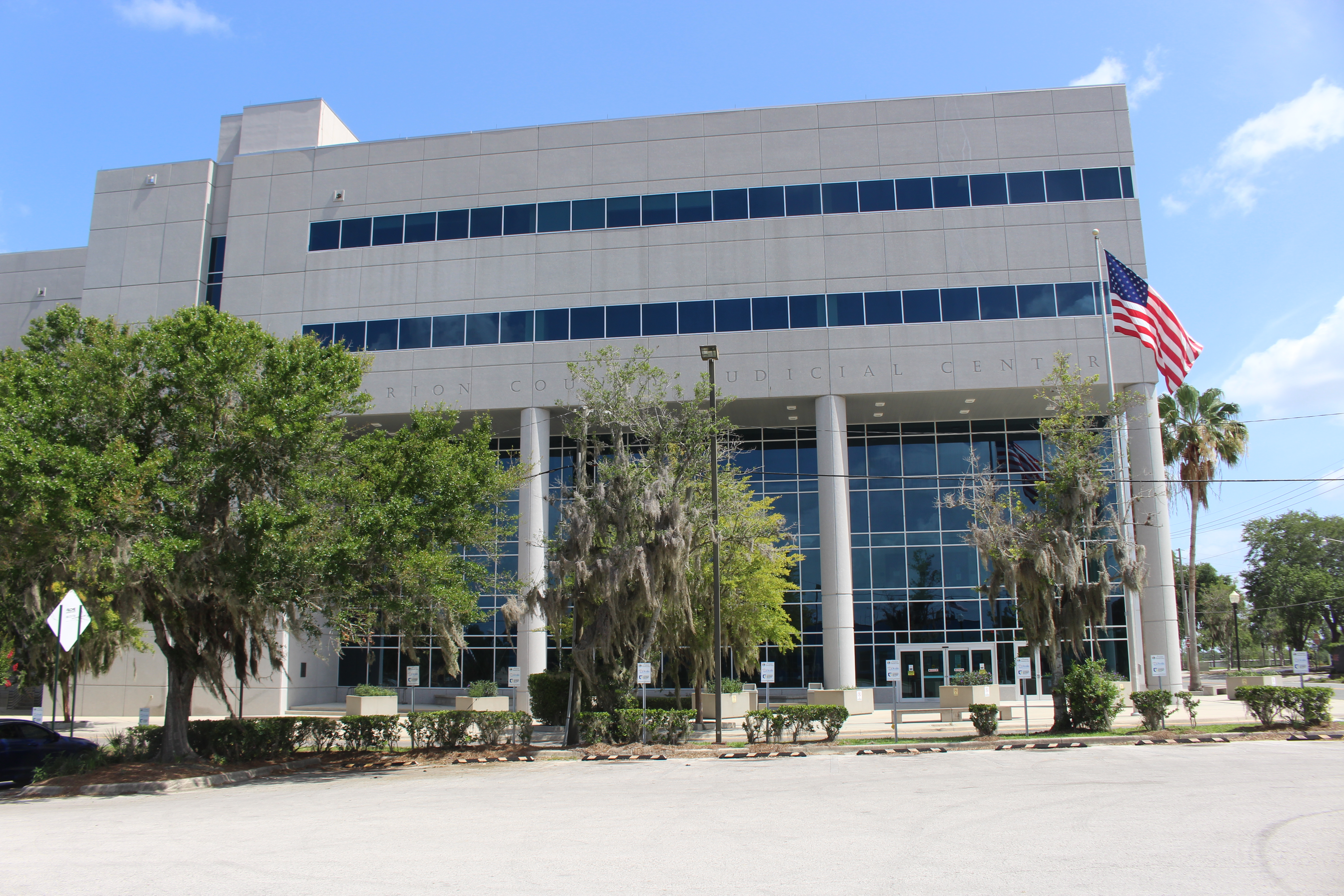
- Marion County Courthouse in Ocala

- Seal

- Location within the U.S. state of Florida
- Coordinates: 29°13′N 82°04′W
- Country: United States
- State: Florida
- Founded: March 14, 1844
- Named for: Francis Marion
- Seat: Ocala
- Largest city: Ocala

Area
  - Total: 1,663 sq mi (4,310 km^{2})
  - Land: 1,585 sq mi (4,110 km^{2})
  - Water: 78 sq mi (200 km^{2}) 4.7%

Population (2020)
  - Total: 375,908
  - Estimate (2025): 442,660 ▲
  - Density: 237/sq mi (92/km^{2})
- Time zone: UTC−5 (Eastern)
  - Summer (DST): UTC−4 (EDT)
- Congressional districts: 3rd, 6th
- Website: marioncountyfl.org

Marion County is a county located in the North Central region of the U.S. state of Florida. As of the 2020 United States census, the population was 375,908. Its county seat is Ocala. Marion County comprises the Ocala, Florida Metropolitan Statistical Area. It includes part of Ocala National Forest, which also extends into three other counties.

== History ==
=== Native Americans ===
Evidence of ancient indigenous cultures has been found in Marion County, as well as of the earliest encounter between European explorers and historic indigenous peoples. In 1976, an archaeological investigation found ancient artifacts in Marion County that appear to be the oldest in mainland United States. Excavations at an ancient stone quarry (on the Container Corporation of America site (8Mf154) in Marion County) yielded "crude stone implements". Thousands of pieces of chert were found at the site. These showed signs of extensive wear and were found in deposits below those holding Paleo-Indian artifacts. Thermoluminescence dating and weathering analysis independently gave dates of 26,000 to 28,000 Years Before Present (YBP) for the production of these artifacts, prior to Clovis points. The findings suggested human habitation in this area much earlier than documented by other evidence. Barbara Purdy had bipoint evidence from the CCA site, which also predated Clovis points, which she reported in a 2008 paper.

The county seat of Ocala is named for a Timucuan village visited and recorded by the Spanish Hernando de Soto expedition in the sixteenth century. During the colonial period, Spain and Great Britain traded control of this area.

=== Settlement ===
After acquisition of the Florida territory by the United States in the 1820s, Marion County was created in 1844 from portions of Alachua, Mosquito (Orange), and Hillsborough counties. Until 1853, Marion County included most of what are now Lake and Sumter counties. In 1849, Putnam County was created and took the northeast portion of Marion. Levy County's creation took some of the western portion of Marion in 1877, near the end of the Reconstruction era.

Marion County is named after General Francis Marion of South Carolina, a guerrilla fighter and hero of the American Revolutionary War who was known as the "Swamp Fox". Numerous early settlers of this area were natives of South Carolina and likely picked their local hero as the county's namesake. The Act creating the county of Marion of the Territory of Florida was signed on March 14, 1844, by the territorial governor, R. K. Call. The county motto is "Kingdom of the Sun".

=== Civil War era ===
Marion County was a hotbed of secessionist activity. Organizers petitioned the state to host the Florida Secession Convention and break away from the United States with other Southern states. The area had many plantations and more than half of the population was enslaved African Americans.

Several Confederate Army units were organized by plantation owners, including the Marion Rifle Guards, organized May 2, 1861, by Captain W.L. Fletcher, county treasurer. It served as part of the Fourth Florida Infantry under Col. Edward Hopkins. Other company's included the Hammock Guards, commanded by Captain J.S. Hopkins; Marion Dragoons, a cavalry unit organized and financed by William A. Owens, Marion Hornets, commanded by Captain Wade Eichelberger, and the Marion Light Artillery, commanded at one time by John Marshall Martin. The Civil War and its aftermath disrupted local society and strained the economy. The population declined in its wake as many African Americans moved to towns or cities for better opportunities.

=== Post-Reconstruction era to mid-20th century ===
During the post-Reconstruction period, there was considerable racial violence in Marion County. Locals lynched between 19 and 26 African Americans in the county from the 1880s to 1935.

=== Mid-20th century to present ===
Since the mid-20th century, thoroughbred horse farms have been established in the county. Such thoroughbred farms have become known for such race champions as Needles, bred at Bonnie Heath Farm, and in 1956, becoming the first Florida-bred horse to win the Kentucky Derby. In 1978 Affirmed from Harbor View Farm won the Triple Crown.

Carl G. Rose, who had come to Florida in 1916 from Indiana to oversee construction of the first asphalt road in the state, is credited with developing the first thoroughbred horse farm in 1943. As an engineer, he had become familiar with the area's limestone, which he realized supported good pasture for raising strong horses. (Limestone also nurtures central Kentucky's noted Bluegrass Region.) In 1943, Rose bought land along State Highway 200, at $10 per acre, establishing Rosemere Farm. The next year one of his horses, Gornil, won at Miami's Tropical Park, becoming the first Florida-raised thoroughbred to win a Florida race. This raised the profile of Marion County in the racing world.

Close on Rose's heels, entrepreneur Bonnie Heath set up his own thoroughbred farm, producing Needles. In 1956 the horse was the state's first native-bred winner of the Kentucky Derby. (see further below). Bonnie Heath Farm is owned and operated by Bonnie Heath III and his wife Kim.

In 1978, Marion County-bred-and-raised Affirmed won the Triple Crown. Today, Marion County is a major world thoroughbred center with more than 1,200 horse farms. There are about 900 thoroughbred farms, totaling some 77,000 acres (310 km^{2}). Ocala is well known as a "horse capital of the world".

=== Tourism ===
The nearby community of Silver Springs developed around the Silver Springs, a group of artesian springs on the Silver River. In the 19th century, this site became Florida's first tourist destination.

Today, well known for glass-bottom boat tours of the area, Silver Springs is owned by the State of Florida; it was incorporated into Silver Springs State Park in 2013. Other nearby natural attractions include the Ocala National Forest and the Florida Trail. Several prominent man-made attractions in the Ocala area existed in the past, such as the Western-themed Six Gun Territory theme park (operated from 1963 to 1984) and the Wild Waters water park (operated from 1978 to 2016).

== Geography ==
According to the U.S. Census Bureau, Marion is the fifth largest county in the state, with a total area of 4,310 km^{2} (1,660 sq mi), of which 3,962 km^{2} (1,530 sq mi) is land and 195 km^{2} (75 sq mi) (4.7%) is water.

Marion County is generally composed of rolling hills. The highest elevation is about 60 meters (200 feet). The majority of its trees consist of live oaks, pines, and palm trees.

It is about a two-hour drive from Marion County to many of Florida's major cities; Orlando is 75 minutes to the southeast, while Daytona Beach is about 90 minutes to the east. Tampa is about 75 minutes to the southwest, Jacksonville is roughly a two-hour drive northeast, and Miami is about six hours to the southeast.

There are several significant lakes within or bordering Marion County. Orange Lake is in the far northern part of Marion County, near the border with Alachua County. Lake Kerr is in the northeastern part of the county, near the town of Salt Springs, which is near the border with Putnam County. Lake Weir, the largest of the three, is in the far southern region, near the border with Lake County. Part of Lake George is also in Marion County.

Marion County is inland, centered between the Atlantic Ocean to the east and the Gulf of Mexico to the west. Because of this, the area is generally not affected as much by hurricanes as the more coastal counties to its east and west. The largest threats from natural disasters are high winds and flooding; tornadoes are also of concern.

=== Adjacent counties ===
- Putnam County, Florida – northeast
- Volusia County, Florida – east
- Lake County, Florida – southeast
- Sumter County, Florida – south
- Citrus County, Florida – southwest
- Levy County, Florida – west
- Alachua County, Florida – northwest

=== National protected area ===
- Ocala National Forest (part)

== Demographics ==
Historical population
| Census | Pop. | Note | %± |
|---|---|---|---|
| 1850 | 3,338 | | — |
| 1860 | 8,609 | | 157.9% |
| 1870 | 10,804 | | 25.5% |
| 1880 | 13,046 | | 20.8% |
| 1890 | 20,796 | | 59.4% |
| 1900 | 24,403 | | 17.3% |
| 1910 | 26,941 | | 10.4% |
| 1920 | 23,968 | | −11.0% |
| 1930 | 29,578 | | 23.4% |
| 1940 | 31,243 | | 5.6% |
| 1950 | 38,187 | | 22.2% |
| 1960 | 51,616 | | 35.2% |
| 1970 | 69,030 | | 33.7% |
| 1980 | 122,488 | | 77.4% |
| 1990 | 194,833 | | 59.1% |
| 2000 | 258,916 | | 32.9% |
| 2010 | 331,298 | | 28.0% |
| 2020 | 375,908 | | 13.5% |
| 2025 (est.) | 442,660 | ▲ | 17.8% |
U.S. Decennial Census; 1790-1960 1900-1990; 1990-2000 2010-2019

Marion County, Florida – Racial and ethnic composition Note: the US Census treats Hispanic/Latino as an ethnic category. This table excludes Latinos from the racial categories and assigns them to a separate category. Hispanics/Latinos may be of any race.
| Race / Ethnicity (NH = Non-Hispanic) | Pop 1980 | Pop 1990 | Pop 2000 | Pop 2010 | Pop 2020 | % 1980 | % 1990 | % 2000 | % 2010 | % 2020 |
|---|---|---|---|---|---|---|---|---|---|---|
| White alone (NH) | 99,833 | 162,861 | 208,232 | 245,136 | 253,837 | 81.50% | 83.59% | 80.42% | 73.99% | 67.53% |
| Black or African American alone (NH) | 20,048 | 24,542 | 29,370 | 39,337 | 42,795 | 16.37% | 12.60% | 11.34% | 11.87% | 11.38% |
| Native American or Alaska Native alone (NH) | 259 | 616 | 998 | 983 | 986 | 0.21% | 0.32% | 0.39% | 0.30% | 0.26% |
| Asian alone (NH) | 250 | 896 | 1,777 | 4,337 | 5,973 | 0.20% | 0.46% | 0.69% | 1.31% | 1.59% |
| Native Hawaiian or Pacific Islander alone (NH) | x | x | 41 | 121 | 148 | x | x | 0.02% | 0.04% | 0.04% |
| Other race alone (NH) | 86 | 58 | 231 | 647 | 1,747 | 0.07% | 0.03% | 0.09% | 0.20% | 0.46% |
| Mixed race or Multiracial (NH) | x | x | 2,651 | 4,600 | 14,512 | x | x | 1.02% | 1.39% | 3.86% |
| Hispanic or Latino (any race) | 2,012 | 5,860 | 15,616 | 36,137 | 55,910 | 1.64% | 3.01% | 6.03% | 10.91% | 14.87% |
| Total | 122,488 | 194,833 | 258,916 | 331,298 | 375,908 | 100.00% | 100.00% | 100.00% | 100.00% | 100.00% |

=== 2020 census ===
As of the 2020 census, the county had a population of 375,908, 156,906 households, and 102,412 families, and the population density was 236.7 per square mile (91.4/km^{2}).

The median age was 50.3 years. 18.0% of residents were under the age of 18 and 29.8% of residents were 65 years of age or older. For every 100 females there were 91.8 males, and for every 100 females age 18 and over there were 89.0 males age 18 and over.

As of the 2020 census, the racial makeup of the county was 71.4% White, 11.8% Black or African American, 0.4% American Indian and Alaska Native, 1.6% Asian, <0.1% Native Hawaiian and Pacific Islander, 4.8% from some other race, and 9.9% from two or more races. Hispanic or Latino residents of any race comprised 14.9% of the population.

As of the 2020 census, 70.7% of residents lived in urban areas, while 29.3% lived in rural areas.

There were 156,906 households in the county, of which 22.6% had children under the age of 18 living in them. Of all households, 47.5% were married-couple households, 16.9% were households with a male householder and no spouse or partner present, and 28.3% were households with a female householder and no spouse or partner present. About 28.4% of all households were made up of individuals and 16.4% had someone living alone who was 65 years of age or older.

There were 177,380 housing units, of which 11.5% were vacant. Among occupied housing units, 75.5% were owner-occupied and 24.5% were renter-occupied. The homeowner vacancy rate was 2.3% and the rental vacancy rate was 9.5%.

=== American Community Survey ===
The 2016–2020 five-year American Community Survey estimates show that the average household size was 2.4 and the average family size was 2.9. The percent of those with a bachelor's degree or higher was estimated to be 15.0% of the population.

The 2016–2020 five-year American Community Survey estimates show that the median household income was $46,587 (with a margin of error of +/- $1,434) and the median family income was $56,181 (+/- $1,758). Males had a median income of $32,045 (+/- $865) versus $25,585 (+/- $601) for females. The median income for those above 16 years old was $28,739 (+/- $827). Approximately, 10.7% of families and 15.5% of the population were below the poverty line, including 26.1% of those under the age of 18 and 8.4% of those ages 65 or over.

=== 2000 census ===
As of the census of 2000, there were 258,916 people, 106,755 households, and 74,621 families residing in the county. The population density was 164 people per square mile (63 people/km^{2}). There were 122,663 dwelling units at an average density of 78 per square mile (30/km^{2}). The racial makeup of the county was 84.16% White, 11.55% Black or African American, 0.45% Native American, 0.70% Asian, 0.02% Pacific Islander, 1.69% from other races, and 1.44% from two or more races. 6.03% of the population were Hispanic or Latino of any race. According to the 2000 Census the largest European ancestry groups in Marion County were English (18.7%), German (16.7%) and Irish (14.0%).

There were 106,755 households, out of which 24.70% had children under the age of 18 living with them, 55.60% were married couples living together, 10.70% had a female householder with no husband present, and 30.10% were non-families. 25.00% of all households were made up of individuals, and 13.00% had someone living alone who was 65 years of age or older. The average household size was 2.36 and the average family size was 2.79.

In the county, the population was spread out, with 21.40% under the age of 18, 6.40% from 18 to 24, 23.80% from 25 to 44, 23.90% from 45 to 64, and 24.50% who were 65 years of age or older. The median age was 44 years. For every 100 females, there were 93.30 males. For every 100 females age 18 and over, there were 89.90 males.

The median income for a household in the county was $31,944, and the median income for a family was $37,473. Males had a median income of $28,836 versus $21,855 for females. The per capita income for the county was $17,848. About 9.20% of families and 13.10% of the population were below the poverty line, including 20.20% of those under age 18 and 7.40% of those age 65 or over.

== Politics ==
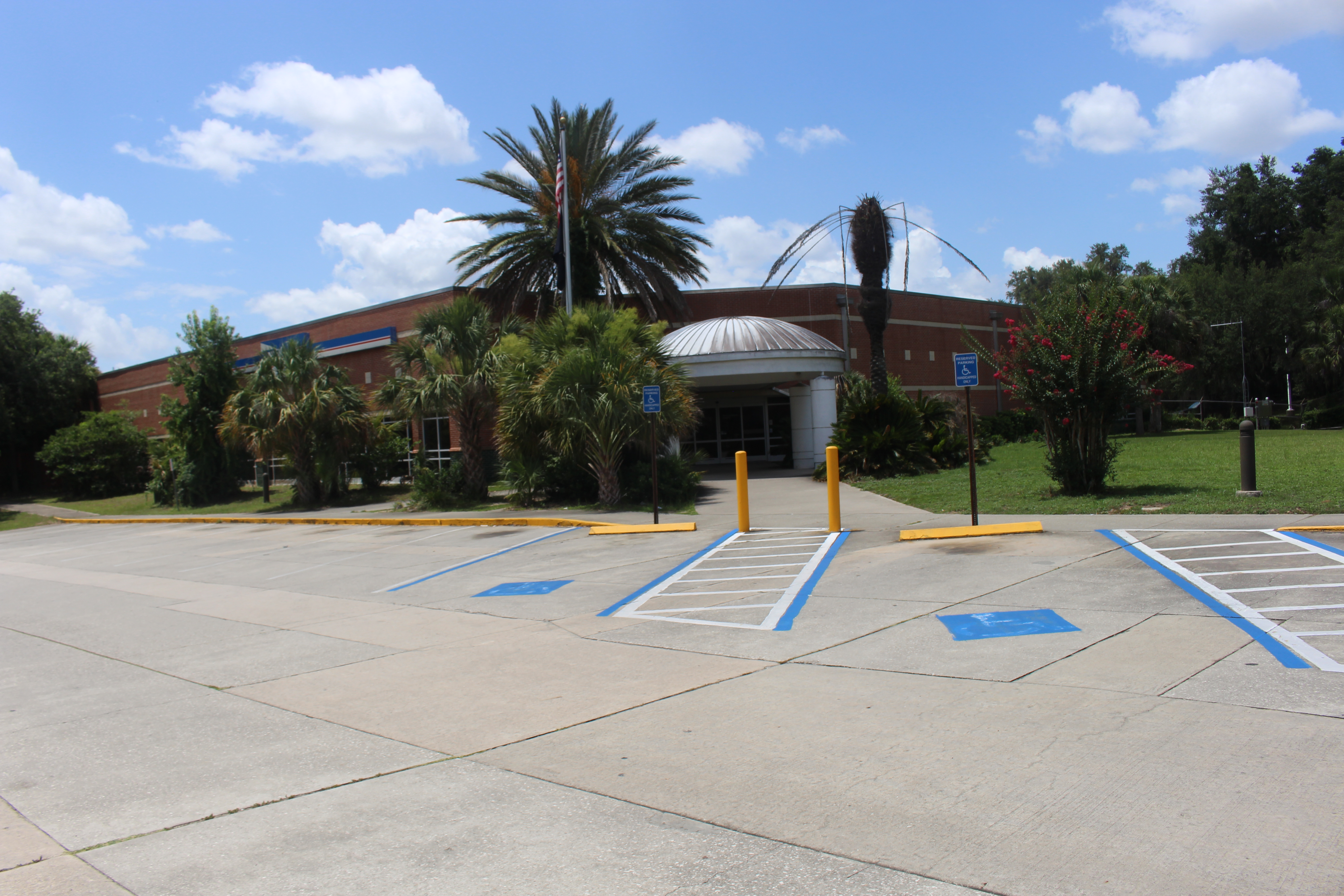
Ocala Post Office

The county is governed by the Marion County Board of County Commissioners. The five-person board currently consists of Craig Curry, Kathy Bryant, Matt McClain, Carl Zalak and Michelle Stone.

The Florida Department of Corrections operates facilities in unincorporated areas in the county, including the Lowell Correctional Institution, and the Lowell Annex which houses Florida's female death row.

Marion County has been a stronghold for the Republican Party since 1980.

United States presidential election results for Marion County, Florida
| Year | Republican | | Democratic | | Third party(ies) | |
| Year | No. | % | No. | % | No. | % |
|---|---|---|---|---|---|---|
| 1892 | 0 | 0.00% | 1,133 | 67.32% | 550 | 32.68% |
| 1896 | 480 | 25.65% | 1,230 | 65.74% | 161 | 8.61% |
| 1900 | 264 | 17.61% | 1,132 | 75.52% | 103 | 6.87% |
| 1904 | 230 | 15.84% | 1,091 | 75.14% | 131 | 9.02% |
| 1908 | 482 | 22.05% | 1,352 | 61.85% | 352 | 16.10% |
| 1912 | 179 | 10.87% | 1,165 | 70.73% | 303 | 18.40% |
| 1916 | 462 | 19.50% | 1,567 | 66.15% | 340 | 14.35% |
| 1920 | 1,232 | 31.57% | 2,436 | 62.43% | 234 | 6.00% |
| 1924 | 359 | 17.25% | 1,528 | 73.43% | 194 | 9.32% |
| 1928 | 1,927 | 49.75% | 1,863 | 48.10% | 83 | 2.14% |
| 1932 | 962 | 23.07% | 3,208 | 76.93% | 0 | 0.00% |
| 1936 | 760 | 14.01% | 4,664 | 85.99% | 0 | 0.00% |
| 1940 | 1,297 | 17.47% | 6,127 | 82.53% | 0 | 0.00% |
| 1944 | 1,642 | 22.68% | 5,597 | 77.32% | 0 | 0.00% |
| 1948 | 1,829 | 22.43% | 4,650 | 57.01% | 1,677 | 20.56% |
| 1952 | 6,134 | 51.17% | 5,854 | 48.83% | 0 | 0.00% |
| 1956 | 6,362 | 50.99% | 6,114 | 49.01% | 0 | 0.00% |
| 1960 | 7,043 | 49.43% | 7,206 | 50.57% | 0 | 0.00% |
| 1964 | 10,879 | 54.42% | 9,112 | 45.58% | 0 | 0.00% |
| 1968 | 7,468 | 32.66% | 5,798 | 25.36% | 9,600 | 41.98% |
| 1972 | 19,505 | 78.18% | 5,397 | 21.63% | 46 | 0.18% |
| 1976 | 16,163 | 47.99% | 16,963 | 50.37% | 553 | 1.64% |
| 1980 | 23,743 | 58.49% | 15,400 | 37.94% | 1,449 | 3.57% |
| 1984 | 37,815 | 69.97% | 16,225 | 30.02% | 6 | 0.01% |
| 1988 | 41,501 | 66.38% | 20,685 | 33.09% | 334 | 0.53% |
| 1992 | 35,442 | 40.74% | 30,829 | 35.44% | 20,718 | 23.82% |
| 1996 | 41,409 | 45.92% | 37,045 | 41.08% | 11,717 | 12.99% |
| 2000 | 55,146 | 53.55% | 44,674 | 43.39% | 3,151 | 3.06% |
| 2004 | 81,283 | 58.19% | 57,271 | 41.00% | 1,123 | 0.80% |
| 2008 | 89,628 | 55.14% | 70,839 | 43.58% | 2,075 | 1.28% |
| 2012 | 93,043 | 57.53% | 66,831 | 41.32% | 1,864 | 1.15% |
| 2016 | 107,833 | 61.30% | 62,041 | 35.27% | 6,026 | 3.43% |
| 2020 | 127,826 | 62.44% | 74,858 | 36.57% | 2,032 | 0.99% |
| 2024 | 140,173 | 65.27% | 72,436 | 33.73% | 2,134 | 0.99% |

== Law enforcement ==
- Marion County Sheriff's Office
- Belleview Police Department
- Dunnellon Police Department
- Ocala Police Department

Marion County's Sheriff's Office was in the news in August 2020 during the COVID-19 pandemic in Florida after Sheriff Billy Woods forbade the wearing of masks by deputies unless in high risk areas, such as the hospital. Visitors to the Sheriff's Office are also required to not cover their face.

== Education ==
County public education is supervised under the Marion County School District. The public school system includes 28 elementary schools, 8 middle schools, 1 4–8 school, 1 K–8 center, 10 high schools, 3 charter schools, and 14 special needs schools.

=== Elementary schools ===
- Anthony Elementary School
- Belleview Elementary School
- Belleview-Santos Elementary School
- College Park Elementary School
- Dr. N.H. Jones Elementary (magnet)
- Dunnellon Elementary School
- East Marion Elementary School
- Eighth Street Elementary School
- Emerald Shores Elementary School
- Evergreen Elementary School (Closed in May 2021)
- Fessenden Elementary School
- Fort McCoy School (K–8)
- Greenway Elementary School
- Hammett Bowen Jr. Elementary School
- Harbour View Elementary School
- Legacy Elementary School
- Madison Street Academy of Visual and Performing Arts (magnet)
- Maplewood Elementary School
- Oakcrest Elementary School
- Ocala Springs Elementary School
- Reddick-Collier Elementary School
- Romeo Elementary School
- Saddlewood Elementary School
- Shady Hill Elementary School
- South Ocala Elementary School
- Sparr Elementary School
- Stanton-Weirsdale Elementary School
- Sunrise Elementary School
- Ward-Highlands Elementary School
- Wyomina Park Elementary School

=== Middle schools ===
- Belleview Middle School
- Dunnellon Middle School
- Fort King Middle School
- Fort McCoy School (K–8)
- Horizon Academy at Marion Oaks
- Howard Middle School
- Lake Weir Middle School
- Liberty Middle School
- North Marion Middle School
- Osceola Middle School

=== High schools ===
- Belleview High School
- Dunnellon High School
- Forest High School
- Lake Weir High School
- Marion Technical Institute
- North Marion High School
- Vanguard High School
- West Port High School
- South Marion High School (opening in 2026)

=== Private schools ===
- Ambleside School Of Ocala, grades K–8
- Belleview Christian Academy, grades PK–9
- Blessed Trinity School, grades K–8
- Children's Palace East & Academy, grades K–2
- The Cornerstone School, grades PK–8
- Crossroads Academy, grades 3–12
- Dr. D. D. Brown Christian Academy of Hope, grades PK-12
- Grace Building Blocks School, grades K–2
- Grace Christian School, grades PK–8
- Meadowbrook Academy, grades K–12
- Montessori Preparatory School, grades K–5
- New Generation School, grades K–12
- Ocala Christian Academy, grades PK–12
- Ocean's High School, grades PK–12
- Promiseland Academy, grades K–7
- First Assembly Christian School, grades PK–12
- The Reading Clinic, grades 2–6
- Redeemer Christian School, grades K–12
- The Rock Academy, grades PK–9
- The School of the Kingdom, grades 1–12
- Shiloh SDA Church School
- St John Lutheran School, grades PK–12
- Trinity Catholic, grades 9–12

=== Colleges ===
- College of Central Florida (Ocala Campus)

=== Libraries ===
The Marion County Public Library System operates the main branch in Ocala and eight other branches throughout the county.

== Transportation ==
=== Airports ===
- Dunnellon/Marion County Airport
- Ocala International Airport

=== Interstates and expressways ===
- I-75 runs north and south across the central part of the county, with interchanges at County Road 484 (exit 341), SR 200 (exit 350) SR 40 (exit 352), US 27 (exit 354) SR 326 (exit 358), and CR 318 (exit 368).

==== Surface roads ====
- US 41 runs north and south through Dunnellon and the southwestern corner of the county.
- US 27 runs northwest and southeast throughout the county. It is multiplexed with US 441 north from the Lake-Marion County line and then with US 301 from Belleview, until it reaches SR 492 in Ocala, then runs northwest through Williston, Perry, Tallahassee, and beyond.
- US 301 is the main local north and south road through the county entering from the northern outskirts of Wildwood in Sumter County. It joins a multiplex with US 27 between Belleview and Ocala, and with US 441 from Belleview to Sparr. From there it runs northeast towards Citra and eastern Alachua County.
- US 441 runs mostly northwest and southeast throughout the county. It is multiplexed with US 27 north from the Lake-Marion County line and then with US 301 into Sparr, where it runs northwest again into McIntosh and Evinston, before crossing the Marion-Alachua County Line on its way to Gainesville, High Springs, Lake City, and points north.
- SR 19 runs north and south along the far eastern edge of the county in Ocala National Forest, which includes the communities of Astor Park and Salt Springs.
- SR 25 is a south-to-north interrupted route that enters the county from Lake County as a bi-county route around Lake Weir. The route briefly becomes a state route between SR 35 and US 27–301–441, and spends the rest of its journey through the county as a "hidden state road" of US 441.
- SR 35 enters the county as a hidden state road along US 301, then turns southeast along US 27–441 in Belleview before turning back north again onto Baseline Road, where it runs until reaching SR 40 in Silver Springs. The route continues as County Road 35 until it reaches SR 326.
- SR 40 is the main west to east road in the county, spanning from US 41 north of Dunnellon, then passing through Ocala, Silver Springs, and Ocala National Forest, crossing the Marion-Lake County line just east of SR 19.
- SR 200 runs northeast and southwest from Stoke's Ferry in Citrus County through US 27-301-441 in Ocala where it becomes a hidden state road along US 301 throughout most of the state further north.
- SR 326 is a bi-county west-to-east road running from Gulf Hammock Wildlife Management Area in Levy County through I-75 where it becomes a state road north of Ocala that turns southeast towards SR 40 in Silver Springs.
- SR 464 runs east and west from SR 200 through the southeastern part of Ocala running along some numbered streets before becoming Maricamp Road, then turns into a county road southeast of SR 35, and continues towards the northern coast of Lake Weir in Ocklawaha.
- SR 492 runs east and west from the northern terminus of US 27's overlap with US 301/441 along northern Ocala to SR 40 in eastern Ocala just before that route enters Silver Springs.

=== Railroads ===
CSX operates one rail line within the county. Amtrak formerly provided passenger rail service to Ocala Union Station, but the stop was terminated in late 2004. The line is a former Seaboard Airline Railroad line known as the Wildwood Subdivision, and is part of the CSX-S Line.

Nearby that line within Ocala is a former line owned by the Florida Northern Railroad, which was previously owned by the Atlantic Coast Line Railroad. It begins in Candler running northwest along Marion County Road 464 towards Ocala Union Station then continues northwest along Marion County 25A to Lowell.

Another FNOR rail line includes a freight line to the Crystal River Energy Complex in northern Citrus County, which was previously owned by the Atlantic Coast Line Railroad. It runs primarily along US 41 between the Citrus and Levy County Lines. Other lines that used to run through Marion County were either converted into rail trails or abandoned.

=== Public surface transportation ===
Local bus service is provided by SunTran.

== Communities ==
=== Cities ===
- Belleview
- Dunnellon
- Ocala

=== Towns ===
- McIntosh
- Reddick

=== Census-designated places ===
- Lake Kerr
- Liberty Triangle
- Marion Oaks
- Ocala Estates
- Ocklawaha
- On Top of the World
- Rainbow Lakes Estates (partly in Levy County)
- Rainbow Park
- Rainbow Springs
- Silver Springs
- Silver Springs Shores
- Silver Spring Shores East
- The Villages (partly in Lake and Sumter Counties)

=== Other unincorporated communities ===
- Anthony
- Citra
- Early Bird
- Evinston (partly in Alachua County)
- Fort McCoy
- Flemington
- Ocklawaha
- Orange Lake
- Orange Springs
- Salt Springs
- Shiloh
- Summerfield
- Wacahoota (partly in Alachua and Levy Counties)
- Weirsdale
- Woods and Lakes, Florida

== See also ==
- National Register of Historic Places listings in Marion County, Florida
- List of county roads in Marion County, Florida
