= Silver Springs Shores, Florida =

- Census-designated place
- Location in Marion County and the state of Florida
- Coordinates: 29°07′12″N 82°00′05″W
- Country: United States
- State: Florida
- County: Marion

Area
  - Total: 15.15 sq mi (39.24 km^{2})
  - Land: 14.93 sq mi (38.68 km^{2})
  - Water: 0.22 sq mi (0.56 km^{2})
- Elevation: 92 ft (28 m)

Population (2020)
  - Total: 24,846
  - Density: 1,663.7/sq mi (642.37/km^{2})
- Time zone: UTC-5 (Eastern (EST))
  - Summer (DST): UTC-4 (EDT)
- ZIP Code: 34472 (Ocala)
- FIPS code: 12-66175
- GNIS feature ID: 2402856

Silver Springs Shores is a census-designated place (CDP) in Marion County, Florida, United States. The population was 24,846 at the 2020 census, up from 6,539 at the 2010 census. It is part of the Ocala, Florida Metropolitan Statistical Area.

The community, often called “The Shores" by locals, serves primarily as a bedroom community for Ocala. It is the largest community in southeastern Marion County.

== Geography ==
Silver Springs Shores is located 10 miles (16 km) southeast of the center of Ocala, the county seat.

According to the United States Census Bureau, the CDP has a total area of 15.1 square miles (39 km^{2}), of which 14.9 square miles (39 km^{2}) are land and 0.2 square miles (0.5 km^{2}), or 1.42%, are water.

== Demographics ==
Historical population
Census	Pop.	Note	%±
1980	3,983		—
1990	6,421		61.2%
2000	6,554		2.1%
2010	6,539		−0.2%
2020	24,846		280.0%
U.S. Decennial Census

=== 2020 census ===
As of the 2020 census, Silver Springs Shores had a population of 24,846. The median age was 38.0 years. 25.4% of residents were under the age of 18 and 17.1% of residents were 65 years of age or older. For every 100 females there were 90.8 males, and for every 100 females age 18 and over there were 87.6 males age 18 and over.

99.0% of residents lived in urban areas, while 1.0% lived in rural areas.

There were 9,057 households in Silver Springs Shores, of which 35.0% had children under the age of 18 living in them. Of all households, 44.9% were married-couple households, 16.5% were households with a male householder and no spouse or partner present, and 29.4% were households with a female householder and no spouse or partner present. About 22.7% of all households were made up of individuals and 11.2% had someone living alone who was 65 years of age or older.

There were 9,893 housing units, of which 8.5% were vacant. The homeowner vacancy rate was 2.1% and the rental vacancy rate was 6.4%.

Racial composition as of the 2020 census
Race	Number	Percent
White	13,131	52.8%
Black or African American	5,715	23.0%
American Indian and Alaska Native	141	0.6%
Asian	442	1.8%
Native Hawaiian and Other Pacific Islander	17	0.1%
Some other race	1,914	7.7%
Two or more races	3,486	14.0%
Hispanic or Latino (of any race)	5,727	23.0%

=== 2000 census ===
As of the census of 2000, there were 6,690 people, 2,846 households, and 1,886 families residing in the CDP. The population density was 1,401.2 inhabitants per square mile (541.0/km^{2}). There were 3,372 housing units at an average density of 706.3 per square mile (272.7/km^{2}). The racial makeup of the CDP was 63.36% White, 28.45% African American, 0.31% Native American, 1.08% Asian, 3.35% from other races, and 3.45% from two or more races. Hispanic or Latino of any race were 12.08% of the population.

There were 2,846 households, out of which 24.3% had children under the age of 18 living with them, 48.1% were married couples living together, 14.8% had a female householder with no husband present, and 33.7% were non-families. 29.0% of all households were made up of individuals, and 19.5% had someone living alone who was 65 years of age or older. The average household size was 2.34 and the average family size was 2.87.

In the CDP, the population was spread out, with 23.9% under the age of 18, 5.9% from 18 to 24, 22.2% from 25 to 44, 19.0% from 45 to 64, and 29.1% who were 65 years of age or older. The median age was 43 years. For every 100 females, there were 80.5 males. For every 100 females age 18 and over, there were 76.6 males.

The median income for a household in the CDP was $26,493, and the median income for a family was $30,723. Males had a median income of $24,798 versus $18,279 for females. The per capita income for the CDP was $13,884. About 8.9% of families and 12.0% of the population were below the poverty line, including 18.5% of those under age 18 and 9.7% of those age 65 or over.

== Schools ==
Most elementary-level students are served by Greenway Elementary and Emerald Shores Elementary schools; most middle school students attend Lake Weir Middle School, with the exception of the far western part of the community attending Fort King Middle School in Ocala. Most high school students attend Lake Weir High School which is located on Oak Road, with the remainder of the students in the far western part of the community attending Forest High School
