= Belleview, Florida =

- City
- City of Belleview
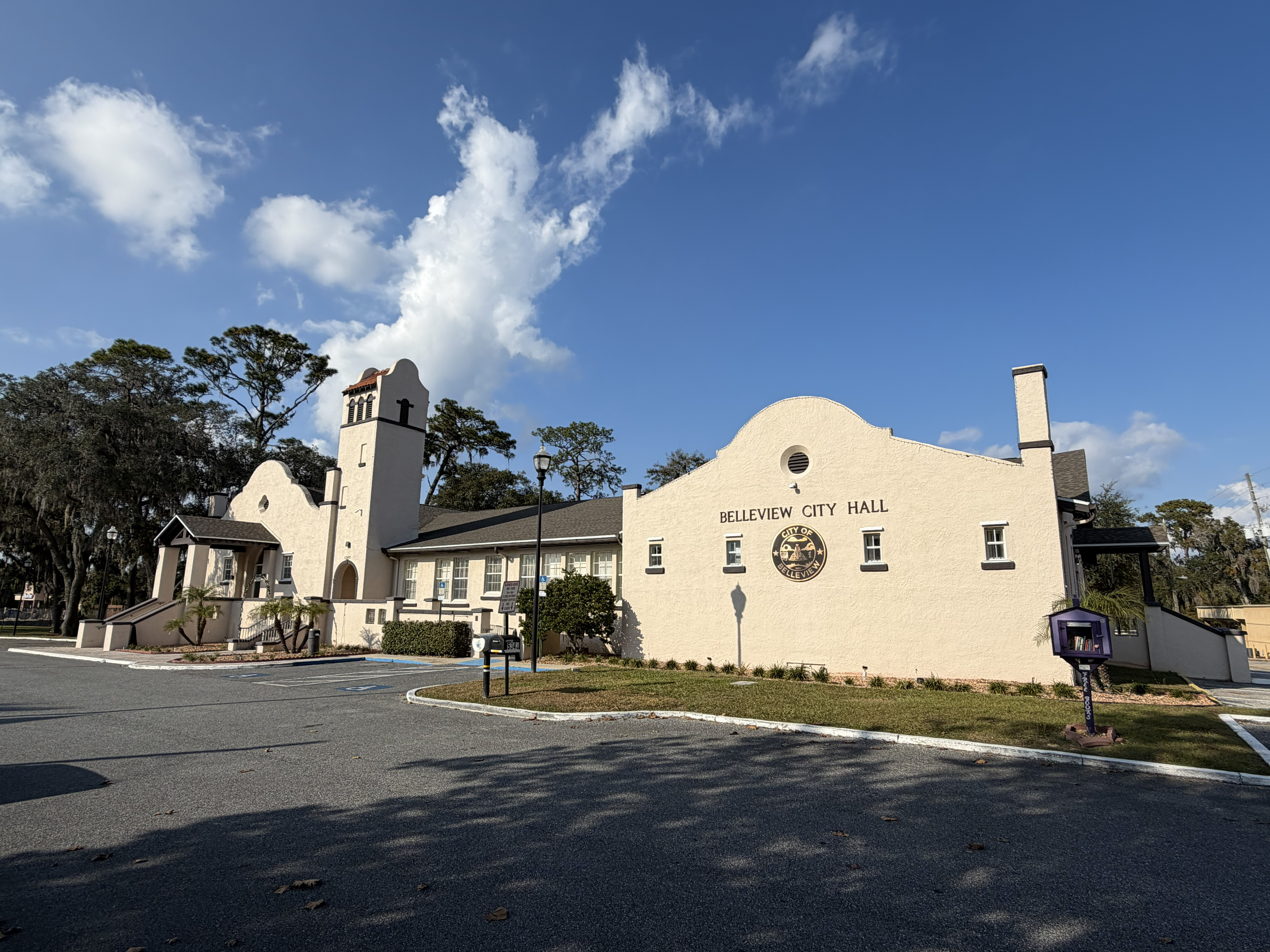
- Old Belleview School, now the City Hall

- Flag Seal
- Motto: "City with Small Town Charm"
- Location in Marion County and the state of Florida
- Coordinates: 29°3′41″N 82°3′18″W
- Country: United States
- State: Florida
- County: Marion
- Incorporated: May 8, 1885

Government
  - Type: Mayor–Commission

Area
  - Total: 3.96 sq mi (10.25 km^{2})
  - Land: 3.95 sq mi (10.24 km^{2})
  - Water: 0.0039 sq mi (0.01 km^{2})
- Elevation: 105 ft (32 m)

Population (2020)
  - Total: 5,413
  - Density: 1,369.7/sq mi (528.85/km^{2})
- Time zone: UTC-5 (Eastern (EST))
  - Summer (DST): UTC-4 (EDT)
- ZIP codes: 34420-34421
- Area code: 352
- FIPS code: 12-05375
- GNIS feature ID: 2403844
- Website: www.belleviewfl.org

Belleview is a city in Marion County, Florida, United States. The population was 5,413 at the 2020 census, up from 4,492 in 2010. It is part of the Ocala Metropolitan Statistical Area. The city's name comes from the French words belle and vue, meaning "beautiful view". "City with Small Town Charm" is the city's motto.

== History ==
A post office has been in operation at Belleview since 1883. The city officially incorporated on May 8, 1885.

== Geography ==
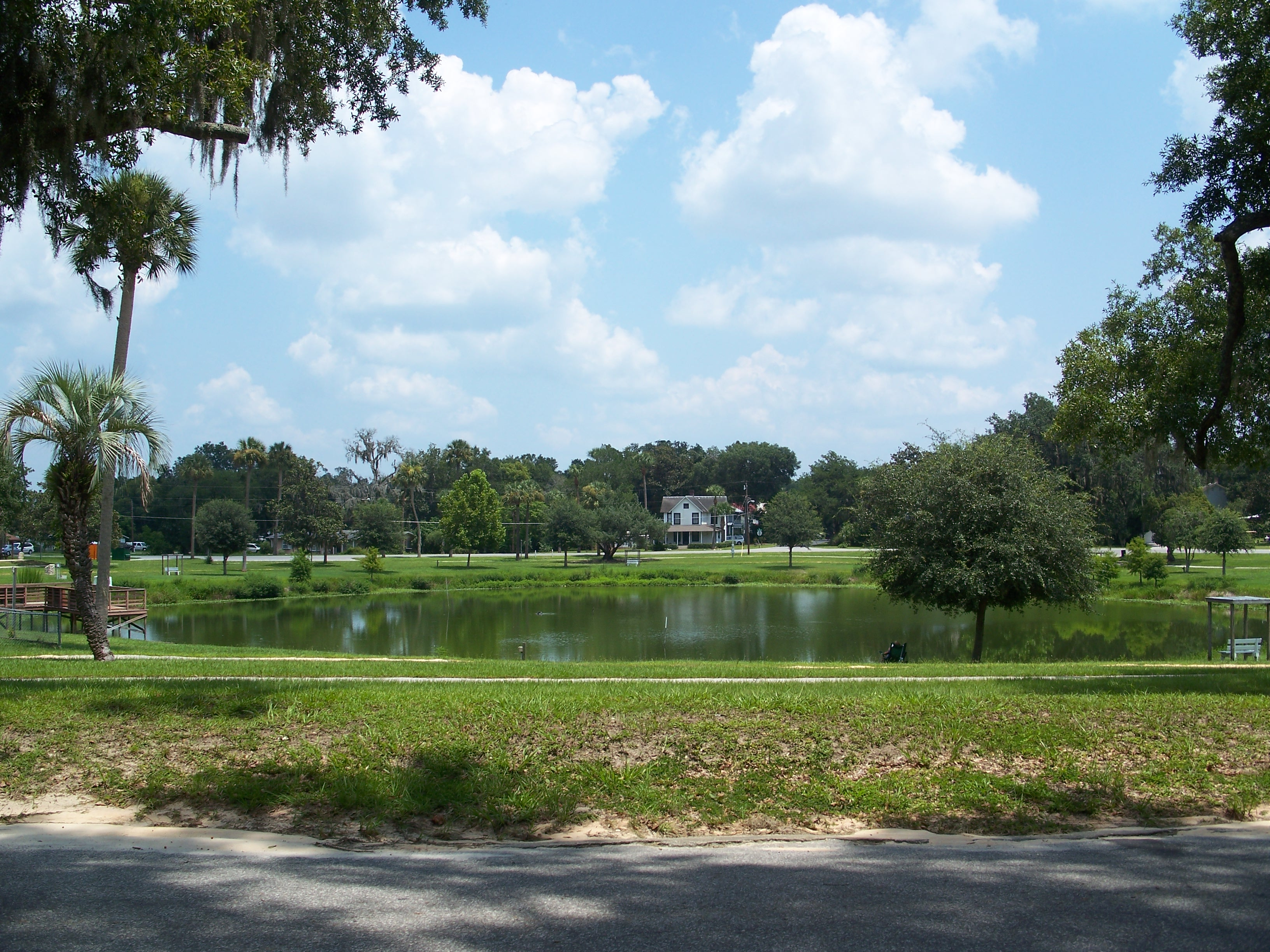
Lake Lillian and its historic district

Belleview is located in southern Marion County. U.S. Routes 27, 301 and 441 pass through the center of town. All three lead northwest 10 miles (16 km) to Ocala, the county seat. Routes 27 and 441 lead southeast 22 miles (35 km) to Leesburg, while Route 301 leads south 13 miles (21 km) to Wildwood.

According to the United States Census Bureau, Belleview has a total area of 4.0 square miles (10 km^{2}), of which 0.004 square miles (2.6 acres), or 0.10%, are water.

== Demographics ==
Historical population
Census	Pop.	Note	%±
1890	130		—
1900	137		5.4%
1910	190		38.7%
1920	237		24.7%
1930	400		68.8%
1940	433		8.3%
1950	595		37.4%
1960	864		45.2%
1970	916		6.0%
1980	1,913		108.8%
1990	2,666		39.4%
2000	3,478		30.5%
2010	4,492		29.2%
2020	5,413		20.5%
U.S. Decennial Census

=== Racial and ethnic composition ===
Belleview racial composition (Hispanics excluded from racial categories) (NH = Non-Hispanic)
Race	Pop 2010	Pop 2020	% 2010	% 2020
White (NH)	3,513	3,745	78.21%	69.19%
Black or African American (NH)	230	312	5.12%	5.76%
Native American or Alaska Native (NH)	20	9	0.45%	0.17%
Asian (NH)	51	50	1.14%	0.92%
Pacific Islander or Native Hawaiian (NH)	2	5	0.04%	0.09%
Some other race (NH)	11	26	0.24%	0.48%
Two or more races/Multiracial (NH)	71	285	1.58%	5.27%
Hispanic or Latino (any race)	594	981	13.22%	18.12%
Total	4,492	5,413	100.00%	100.00%

=== 2020 census ===
As of the 2020 census, Belleview had a population of 5,413. The median age was 40.5 years. 22.4% of residents were under the age of 18 and 20.2% of residents were 65 years of age or older. For every 100 females, there were 92.6 males, and for every 100 females age 18 and over there were 89.0 males age 18 and over.

99.7% of residents lived in urban areas, while 0.3% lived in rural areas.

There were 2,224 households in Belleview, of which 30.0% had children under the age of 18 living in them. Of all households, 36.1% were married-couple households, 21.0% were households with a male householder and no spouse or partner present, and 34.3% were households with a female householder and no spouse or partner present. About 33.7% of all households were made up of individuals and 15.9% had someone living alone who was 65 years of age or older.

There were 2,464 housing units, of which 9.7% were vacant. The homeowner vacancy rate was 2.4% and the rental vacancy rate was 6.8%.

According to the Census Bureau's 2020 ACS 5-year estimates, there were 1,342 families residing in the city.

=== 2010 census ===
As of the 2010 United States census, there were 4,492 people, 1,897 households, and 1,337 families residing in the city.

=== 2000 census ===
As of the census of 2000, there were 3,478 people, 1,600 households, and 956 families residing in the city. The population density was 1,905.5 inhabitants per square mile (735.7/km^{2}). There were 1,806 dwelling units at an average density of 989.5 per square mile (382.0/km^{2}). The racial makeup of the city was 91.14% White, 4.23% African American, 0.46% Native American, 0.58% Asian, 2.10% from other races, and 1.50% from two or more races. Hispanic or Latino of any race were 7.68% of the population.

In 2000, there were 1,600 households, out of which 22.5% had children under the age of 18 living with them, 41.8% were married couples living together, 14.4% had a female householder with no husband present, and 40.2% were non-families. 34.6% of all households were made up of individuals, and 19.7% had someone living alone who was 65 years of age or older. The average household size was 2.14 and the average family size was 2.72.

In 2000, in the city, the population was spread out, with 20.2% under the age of 18, 8.3% from 18 to 24, 23.5% from 25 to 44, 20.4% from 45 to 64, and 27.5% who were 65 years of age or older. The median age was 43 years. For every 100 females, there were 87.7 males. For every 100 females age 18 and over, there were 82.3 males.

In 2000, the median income for a household in the city was $26,250, and the median income for a family was $33,701. Males had a median income of $27,500 versus $18,250 for females. The per capita income for the city was $18,241. About 8.8% of families and 12.3% of the population were below the poverty line, including 12.8% of those under age 18 and 7.4% of those age 65 or over.

== Educational facilities ==
The city's school district is Marion County Public Schools. The schools in Belleview are:

- Belleview High School
- Belleview Middle School
- Belleview Elementary School
- Belleview-Santos Elementary School
