= Gina Tuttle =

American actress

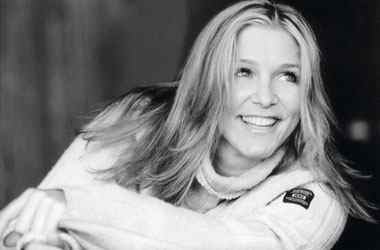
- Born: California
- Occupations: Actress, voice over artist
- Years active: 1989—present
- Website: ginatuttle.com

Gina Tuttle is an American actress and voice-over artist. She has been the announcer for the Academy Awards on four occasions.

== Early life ==
Gina Tuttle was born in California. She spent her teenage years in the Ocala, Florida area, where she graduated from Lake Weir High School. When she was 16, she began modeling bathing suits and clothing for Belk Lindsey department store advertisements.

== Career ==
When she was 19 years old, Tuttle returned to California and began working as an actress and announcer. She has been an announcer for the Academy Awards on multiple occasions, beginning in 2001 with Steve Martin and also 2007 with Ellen DeGeneres, co-hosting with Don LaFontaine, and on camera. She was the announcer, again, in 2009 with Hugh Jackman, and subsequently at the 82nd Academy Awards with Alec Baldwin and Steve Martin as co-hosts.
