= Ocala Estates, Florida =

- Census-designated place
- Location within Florida Location within the United States
- Coordinates: 29°12′06″N 82°18′35″W
- Country: United States
- State: Florida
- County: Marion

Area
  - Total: 0.98 sq mi (2.53 km^{2})
  - Land: 0.98 sq mi (2.53 km^{2})
  - Water: 0 sq mi (0.00 km^{2})
- Elevation: 62 ft (19 m)

Population (2020)
  - Total: 2,991
  - Density: 3,066.2/sq mi (1,183.86/km^{2})
- Time zone: UTC-5 (Eastern (EST))
  - Summer (DST): UTC-4 (EDT)
- ZIP Code: 34482 (Ocala)
- Area code: 352
- FIPS code: 12-50756
- GNIS feature ID: 2805182

Ocala Estates is an unincorporated community and census-designated place (CDP) in western Marion County, Florida, United States. It is 11 miles (18 km) west of Ocala, the county seat.

Ocala Estates was first listed as a CDP for the 2020 census, at which time it had a population of 2,991. It is part of the Ocala, Florida Metropolitan Statistical Area.

== Demographics ==
Historical population
Census	Pop.	Note	%±
2020	2,991		—
U.S. Decennial Census

Ocala Estates first appeared as a census designated place in the 2020 U.S. census.

=== 2020 census ===
As of the 2020 census, Ocala Estates had a population of 2,991. The median age was 34.8 years. 22.6% of residents were under the age of 18 and 7.4% of residents were 65 years of age or older. For every 100 females there were 57.4 males, and for every 100 females age 18 and over there were 45.8 males age 18 and over.

0.0% of residents lived in urban areas, while 100.0% lived in rural areas.

There were 656 households in Ocala Estates, of which 41.0% had children under the age of 18 living in them. Of all households, 42.1% were married-couple households, 20.4% were households with a male householder and no spouse or partner present, and 27.1% were households with a female householder and no spouse or partner present. About 17.9% of all households were made up of individuals and 6.4% had someone living alone who was 65 years of age or older.

There were 735 housing units, of which 10.7% were vacant. The homeowner vacancy rate was 3.2% and the rental vacancy rate was 6.2%.

Racial composition as of the 2020 census
Race	Number	Percent
White	1,567	52.4%
Black or African American	319	10.7%
American Indian and Alaska Native	30	1.0%
Asian	11	0.4%
Native Hawaiian and Other Pacific Islander	0	0.0%
Some other race	697	23.3%
Two or more races	367	12.3%
Hispanic or Latino (of any race)	1,241	41.5%
