= On Top of the World, Florida =

On Top of the World
- Census-designated place
- Location within Florida Location within the United States
- Coordinates: 29°06′36″N 82°17′12″W
- Country: United States
- State: Florida
- County: Marion

Area
  - Total: 17.51 sq mi (45.34 km^{2})
  - Land: 17.51 sq mi (45.34 km^{2})
  - Water: 0 sq mi (0.00 km^{2})
- Elevation: 69 ft (21 m)

Population (2020)
  - Total: 12,668
  - Density: 724/sq mi (279.4/km^{2})
- Time zone: UTC-5 (Eastern (EST))
  - Summer (DST): UTC-4 (EDT)
- ZIP Codes: 34481, 34476 (Ocala); 34432 (Dunnellon)
- Area code: 352
- FIPS code: 12-51587
- GNIS feature ID: 2805184

On Top of the World is a census-designated place (CDP) in southwestern Marion County, Florida, United States. It is 11 miles (18 km) southwest of Ocala, the county seat.

On Top of the World was first listed as a CDP for the 2020 census, when it had a population of 12,668. It is part of the Ocala, Florida Metropolitan Statistical Area.

== Demographics ==
Historical population
Census	Pop.	Note	%±
2020	12,668		—
U.S. Decennial Census

On Top of the World first appeared as a census designated place in the 2020 U.S. census.

=== 2020 census ===
As of the 2020 census, On Top of the World had a population of 12,668. The median age was 72.5 years. 0.5% of residents were under the age of 18 and 80.8% of residents were 65 years of age or older. For every 100 females there were 82.6 males, and for every 100 females age 18 and over there were 82.4 males age 18 and over.

72.3% of residents lived in urban areas, while 27.7% lived in rural areas.

There were 7,203 households in On Top of the World, of which 1.6% had children under the age of 18 living in them. Of all households, 61.1% were married-couple households, 9.8% were households with a male householder and no spouse or partner present, and 25.8% were households with a female householder and no spouse or partner present. About 30.7% of all households were made up of individuals and 27.1% had someone living alone who was 65 years of age or older.

There were 7,838 housing units, of which 8.1% were vacant. The homeowner vacancy rate was 2.1% and the rental vacancy rate was 16.6%.

Racial composition as of the 2020 census
Race	Number	Percent
White	11,646	91.9%
Black or African American	249	2.0%
American Indian and Alaska Native	20	0.2%
Asian	159	1.3%
Native Hawaiian and Other Pacific Islander	3	0.0%
Some other race	82	0.6%
Two or more races	509	4.0%
Hispanic or Latino (of any race)	536	4.2%
