= Marion Oaks, Florida =

- Census-designated place
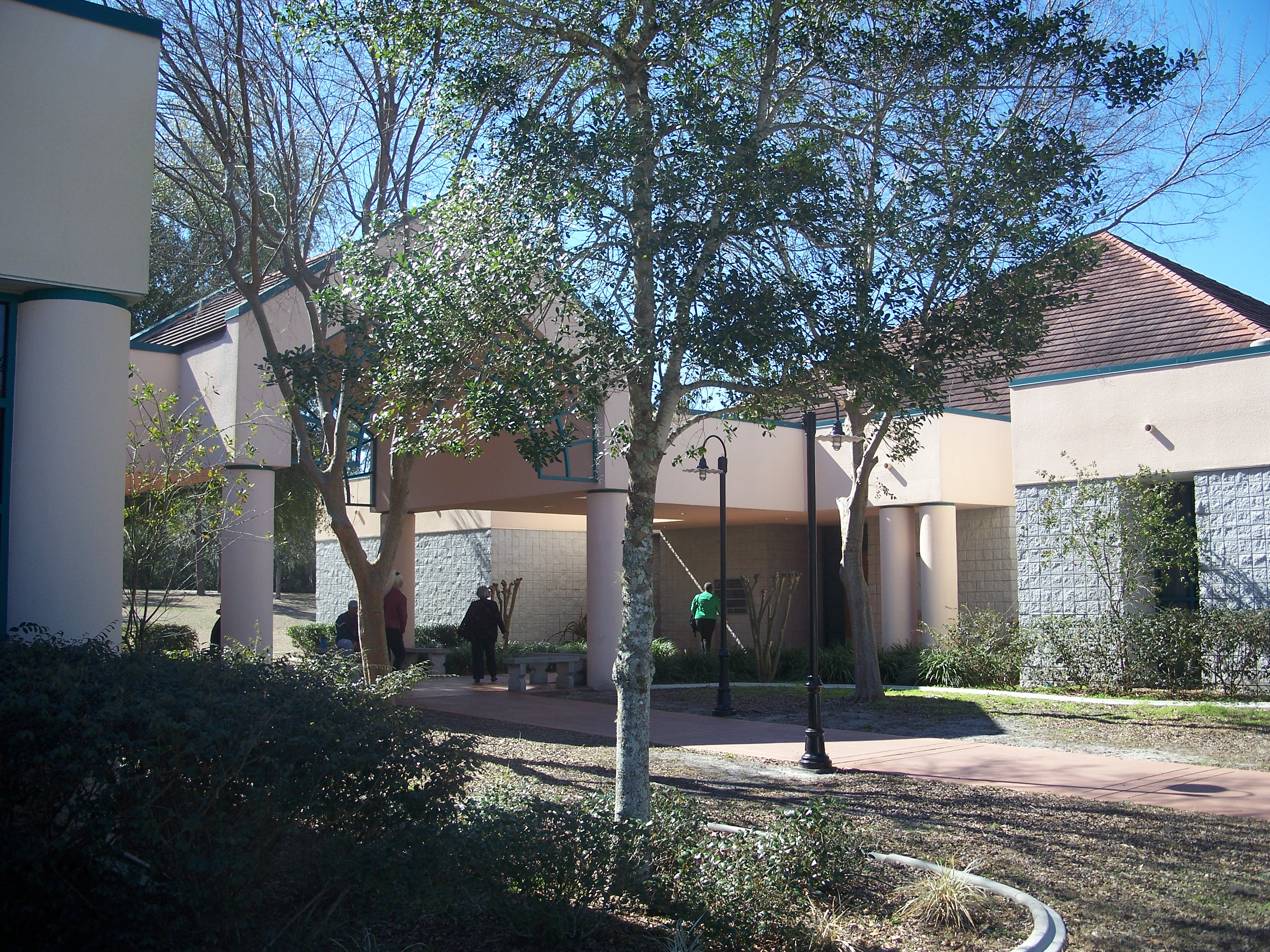
- Marion Oaks Community Center

- Flag

- Location within Florida Location within the United States
- Coordinates: 29°0′30″N 82°10′59″W
- Country: United States
- State: Florida
- County: Marion

Area
  - Total: 29.53 sq mi (76.5 km^{2})
  - Land: 29.35 sq mi (76.0 km^{2})
  - Water: 0.18 sq mi (0.47 km^{2})
- Elevation: 95 ft (29 m)

Population (2020)
  - Total: 19,034
  - Density: 648.5/sq mi (250.4/km^{2})
- Time zone: UTC-5 (Eastern (EST))
  - Summer (DST): UTC-4 (EDT)
- ZIP Code: 34473 (Ocala)
- Area code: 352
- FIPS code: 12-43300
- GNIS feature ID: 2805178

Marion Oaks is an unincorporated community and census-designated place (CDP) in Marion County, Florida, United States. It is part of the Ocala Metropolitan Statistical Area. As of the 2020 census, the population was 19,034.

== Geography ==
The community is in southern Marion County, extending south to the Sumter County line. It is bordered to the east by Interstate 75, with access from Exit 341 (County Road 484). Ocala, the county seat, is 14 miles (23 km) to the north, and Bushnell is 27 miles (43 km) to the south.

According to the U.S. Census Bureau, the Marion Oaks CDP has a total area of 29.5 square miles (76 km^{2}), of which 0.2 square miles (0.5 km^{2}), or 0.62%, are water.

== Demographics ==
Marion Oaks first appeared as a census designated place in the 2020 U.S. census.

=== 2020 census ===
As of the 2020 census, Marion Oaks had a population of 19,034. The median age was 39.3 years. 24.1% of residents were under the age of 18 and 18.4% of residents were 65 years of age or older. For every 100 females there were 92.5 males, and for every 100 females age 18 and over there were 89.6 males age 18 and over.

90.3% of residents lived in urban areas, while 9.7% lived in rural areas.

There were 6,710 households in Marion Oaks, of which 34.5% had children under the age of 18 living in them. Of all households, 49.2% were married-couple households, 14.9% were households with a male householder and no spouse or partner present, and 27.2% were households with a female householder and no spouse or partner present. About 19.1% of all households were made up of individuals and 9.8% had someone living alone who was 65 years of age or older.

There were 7,261 housing units, of which 7.6% were vacant. The homeowner vacancy rate was 3.1% and the rental vacancy rate was 6.9%.

Racial composition as of the 2020 census
Race	Number	Percent
White	7,353	38.6%
Black or African American	4,856	25.5%
American Indian and Alaska Native	102	0.5%
Asian	264	1.4%
Native Hawaiian and Other Pacific Islander	10	0.1%
Some other race	2,541	13.3%
Two or more races	3,908	20.5%
Hispanic or Latino (of any race)	7,623	40.0%

== Education ==
=== Compulsory education ===
Marion Oaks has three schools: Sunrise Elementary School (K-4), Marion Oaks Elementary (K-4), and Horizon Academy at Marion Oaks (5-8). Marion Oaks Elementary has an ESE wing.

The majority of Marion Oaks is zoned for Sunrise Elementary School, Horizon Academy and South Marion High school (Coming august 2026). The Northern section of Marion Oaks is zoned for Marion Oaks Elementary and South Marion High School (coming August 2026).

=== College and vocational ===
College of Central Florida is a large community college which provides service to the entire Ocala metro area. CF offers multiple programs of study including bachelor's degrees and vocational training. Also on the campus is the University Center which houses satellites for state and private schools including University of Central Florida, Florida State University, University of Florida and St. Leo University.

== Emergency services ==
Marion Oaks public safety services are currently provided by Marion County.

=== Fire and rescue ===
Marion Oaks has one fire station, which is located at the corner of Marion Oaks Lane and Marion Oaks Course. The fire station currently has 18 career firefighters.

=== Sheriff's office ===
Law enforcement for Marion Oaks is provided by the Marion County Sheriff's Office. A lieutenant, detective and eight patrol deputies are assigned to the area. The MCSO has a district office located in the Marion Oaks Community Center on Marion Oaks Lane at the intersection of Marion Oaks Boulevard.
