= Rainbow Park, Florida =

- Census-designated place
- Location within Florida Location within the United States
- Coordinates: 29°09′47″N 82°22′20″W
- Country: United States
- State: Florida
- County: Marion

Area
  - Total: 4.83 sq mi (12.50 km^{2})
  - Land: 4.83 sq mi (12.50 km^{2})
  - Water: 0 sq mi (0.00 km^{2})
- Elevation: 85 ft (26 m)

Population (2020)
  - Total: 1,672
  - Density: 346.4/sq mi (133.74/km^{2})
- Time zone: UTC-5 (Eastern (EST))
  - Summer (DST): UTC-4 (EDT)
- ZIP Code: 34481 (Ocala)
- Area code: 352
- FIPS code: 12-59466
- GNIS feature ID: 2805190

Rainbow Park is an unincorporated community and census-designated place (CDP) in western Marion County, Florida, United States. It is on the northwest side of Florida State Road 40, 14 miles (23 km) west of Ocala, the county seat, and 10 miles (16 km) northeast of Dunnellon.

Rainbow Park was first listed as a CDP for the 2020 census, at which time it had a population of 1,672. It is part of the Ocala, Florida Metropolitan Statistical Area.

== Demographics ==
Historical population
Census	Pop.	Note	%±
2020	1,672		—
U.S. Decennial Census

Rainbow Park first appeared as a census designated place in the 2020 U.S. census.

=== 2020 census ===
As of the 2020 census, Rainbow Park had a population of 1,672. The median age was 38.3 years. 26.4% of residents were under the age of 18 and 15.0% of residents were 65 years of age or older. For every 100 females there were 100.7 males, and for every 100 females age 18 and over there were 96.0 males age 18 and over.

0.0% of residents lived in urban areas, while 100.0% lived in rural areas.

There were 604 households in Rainbow Park, of which 33.4% had children under the age of 18 living in them. Of all households, 46.2% were married-couple households, 19.7% were households with a male householder and no spouse or partner present, and 23.2% were households with a female householder and no spouse or partner present. About 19.7% of all households were made up of individuals and 6.4% had someone living alone who was 65 years of age or older.

There were 675 housing units, of which 10.5% were vacant. The homeowner vacancy rate was 4.0% and the rental vacancy rate was 1.2%.

Racial composition as of the 2020 census
Race	Number	Percent
White	1,111	66.4%
Black or African American	128	7.7%
American Indian and Alaska Native	10	0.6%
Asian	15	0.9%
Native Hawaiian and Other Pacific Islander	1	0.1%
Some other race	148	8.9%
Two or more races	259	15.5%
Hispanic or Latino (of any race)	441	26.4%
