= Liberty Triangle, Florida =

- Census-designated place
- Location within Florida Location within the United States
- Coordinates: 29°04′14″N 82°14′23″W
- Country: United States
- State: Florida
- County: Marion

Area
  - Total: 18.24 sq mi (47.25 km^{2})
  - Land: 18.24 sq mi (47.25 km^{2})
  - Water: 0 sq mi (0.00 km^{2})
- Elevation: 66 ft (20 m)

Population (2020)
  - Total: 23,759
  - Density: 1,302.4/sq mi (502.87/km^{2})
- Time zone: UTC-5 (Eastern (EST))
  - Summer (DST): UTC-4 (EDT)
- ZIP Codes: 34476, 34481 (Ocala)
- Area code: 352
- FIPS code: 12-40387
- GNIS feature ID: 2813336

Liberty Triangle is an unincorporated area and census-designated place (CDP) in southwestern Marion County, Florida, United States. It is bordered to the north by Ocala, the county seat, to the east by Interstate 75, and to the northwest by Florida State Road 200.

Liberty Triangle was first listed as a CDP prior to the 2020 census, at which time the population was 23,759. It is part of the Ocala, Florida Metropolitan Statistical Area.

== Demographics ==
Historical population
Census	Pop.	Note	%±
2020	23,759		—
U.S. Decennial Census

Liberty Triangle first appeared as a census designated place in the 2020 U.S. census.

=== 2020 census ===
As of the 2020 census, Liberty Triangle had a population of 23,759. The median age was 62.3 years. 13.4% of residents were under the age of 18 and 45.4% of residents were 65 years of age or older. For every 100 females there were 87.3 males, and for every 100 females age 18 and over there were 84.9 males age 18 and over.

95.5% of residents lived in urban areas, while 4.5% lived in rural areas.

There were 10,995 households in Liberty Triangle, of which 16.2% had children under the age of 18 living in them. Of all households, 54.5% were married-couple households, 13.0% were households with a male householder and no spouse or partner present, and 27.6% were households with a female householder and no spouse or partner present. About 29.7% of all households were made up of individuals and 23.1% had someone living alone who was 65 years of age or older.

There were 11,842 housing units, of which 7.2% were vacant. The homeowner vacancy rate was 2.2% and the rental vacancy rate was 8.6%.

Racial composition as of the 2020 census
Race	Number	Percent
White	17,515	73.7%
Black or African American	2,049	8.6%
American Indian and Alaska Native	66	0.3%
Asian	603	2.5%
Native Hawaiian and Other Pacific Islander	13	0.1%
Some other race	1,010	4.3%
Two or more races	2,503	10.5%
Hispanic or Latino (of any race)	3,526	14.8%
