= Tim Hicks (American football) =

American football player (born 1979)

No. 16
- Position: Quarterback

Personal information
- Born: October 20, 1979 (age 47)
- Listed height: 6 ft 4 in (1.93 m)
- Listed weight: 255 lb (116 kg)

Career information
- High school: Lake Weir (Ocala, Florida)
- College: West Liberty State
- NFL draft: 2003: undrafted

Career history
- Charleston Swamp Foxes (2003); Wilkes-Barre/Scranton Pioneers (2004); Nashville Kats (2005); Bossier–Shreveport Battle Wings (2005); Columbus Destroyers (2006); Quad City Steamwheelers (2006); Los Angeles Avengers (2007–2008); Alabama Vipers (2010)

Career AFL statistics
- Comp. / Att.: 196 / 338
- Passing yards: 2,388
- TD–INT: 45–14
- QB rating: 95.87
- Rushing TD: 2
- Stats at ArenaFan.com

Tim Hicks (born October 20, 1979) is an American professional former football quarterback who played three seasons in the Arena Football League (AFL) with the Los Angeles Avengers and Alabama Vipers. He played college football at West Liberty State College and attended Lake Weir High School in Ocala, Florida. He was also a member of the Charleston Swamp Foxes, Wilkes-Barre/Scranton Pioneers, Nashville Kats, Bossier–Shreveport Battle Wings, Columbus Destroyers and Quad City Steamwheelers.
