= Rainbow Springs, Florida =

- Census-designated place
- Location within Florida Location within the United States
- Coordinates: 29°06′36″N 82°25′42″W
- Country: United States
- State: Florida
- County: Marion

Area
  - Total: 11.68 sq mi (30.25 km^{2})
  - Land: 11.54 sq mi (29.89 km^{2})
  - Water: 0.14 sq mi (0.36 km^{2})
- Elevation: 62 ft (19 m)

Population (2020)
  - Total: 5,091
  - Density: 441.1/sq mi (170.32/km^{2})
- Time zone: UTC-5 (Eastern (EST))
  - Summer (DST): UTC-4 (EDT)
- ZIP Codes: 34431, 34432 (Dunnellon)
- Area code: 352
- FIPS code: 12-59470
- GNIS feature ID: 2805191

Rainbow Springs is an unincorporated community and census-designated place (CDP) in southwestern Marion County, Florida, United States. It is named for the first-magnitude artesian spring found in the community. U.S. Route 41 passes through the CDP, leading south 3.5 miles (5.6 km) to Dunnellon and north 20 miles (32 km) to Williston. Ocala, the Marion county seat, is 20 miles (32 km) to the northeast.

The community was first listed as a CDP for the 2020 census, at which time it had a population of 5,091. It is part of the Ocala, Florida Metropolitan Statistical Area.

== Demographics ==
Historical population
Census	Pop.	Note	%±
2020	5,091		—
U.S. Decennial Census

Rainbow Springs first appeared as a census designated place in the 2020 U.S. census.

=== 2020 census ===
As of the 2020 census, Rainbow Springs had a population of 5,091. The median age was 66.5 years. 8.3% of residents were under the age of 18 and 53.6% of residents were 65 years of age or older. For every 100 females there were 91.2 males, and for every 100 females age 18 and over there were 90.6 males age 18 and over.

80.3% of residents lived in urban areas, while 19.7% lived in rural areas.

There were 2,507 households in Rainbow Springs, of which 10.2% had children under the age of 18 living in them. Of all households, 61.5% were married-couple households, 12.3% were households with a male householder and no spouse or partner present, and 22.0% were households with a female householder and no spouse or partner present. About 25.3% of all households were made up of individuals and 18.4% had someone living alone who was 65 years of age or older.

There were 2,812 housing units, of which 10.8% were vacant. The homeowner vacancy rate was 1.4% and the rental vacancy rate was 7.9%.

Racial composition as of the 2020 census
Race	Number	Percent
White	4,540	89.2%
Black or African American	110	2.2%
American Indian and Alaska Native	28	0.5%
Asian	39	0.8%
Native Hawaiian and Other Pacific Islander	4	0.1%
Some other race	76	1.5%
Two or more races	294	5.8%
Hispanic or Latino (of any race)	316	6.2%
