= Marion Technical Institute =

Coordinates: 29.1837269°N 82.1132129°W

Marion Technical Institute (MTI) is a vocational school in Marion County, Florida. The school offers nine courses: information technology, building sciences, robotics, culinary arts, automotive technology, business & finance, law & government, career academy, and global logistics.
