= McIntosh, Florida =

Town in the state of Florida, United States

- Town
- Town of McIntosh
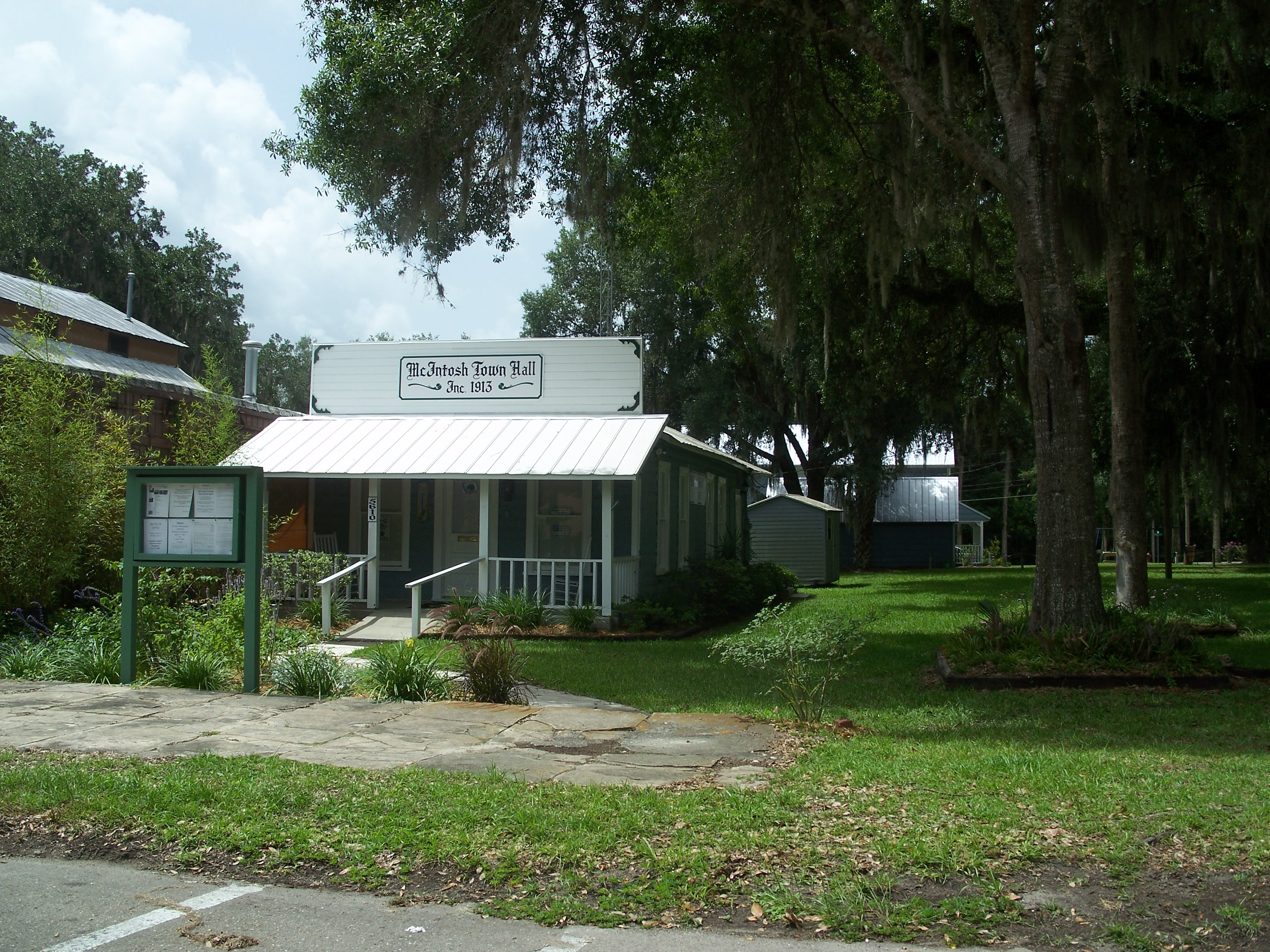
- McIntosh Town Hall

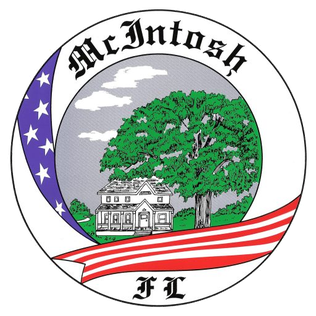
- Seal

- Location in Marion County and the state of Florida
- Coordinates: 29°26′58″N 82°13′16″W
- Country: United States
- State: Florida
- County: Marion
- Settled: c. Early 1820s–February 2, 1849
- Plattled: 1885–1888
- Incorporated: May 22, 1913

Government
  - Type: Council-Manager
  - Mayor: Alison Scott
  - Council President: Frank Ciotti
  - Councilmembers: Lee Deaderick, Donald "Don" Medeiros, Melinda Jones, and Council Vice President; Scott Mullikin
  - Town Manager and Town Clerk: Jessica Gonzalez
  - Town Attorney: Stacie Lynne Corbett

Area
  - Total: 0.71 sq mi (1.84 km^{2})
  - Land: 0.71 sq mi (1.84 km^{2})
  - Water: 0 sq mi (0.00 km^{2})
- Elevation: 102 ft (31 m)

Population (2020)
  - Total: 463
  - Density: 651.1/sq mi (251.38/km^{2})
- Time zone: UTC-5 (Eastern (EST))
  - Summer (DST): UTC-4 (EDT)
- ZIP code: 32664
- Area code: 352
- FIPS code: 12-42150
- GNIS feature ID: 2406132
- Website: www.townofmcintosh.org

McIntosh is a town in Marion County, Florida, United States. It is part of the Ocala, Florida Metropolitan Statistical Area. As of the 2020 census, the town population was 463, up from 452 at the 2010 census.

== History ==
The earliest documented colonizer to inhabit the area near McIntosh was in the early 1820s by Colonel John Houstoun McIntosh, who lived in a plantation until it was destroyed by Seminoles, along with them burning his sugar mill, during the Second Seminole War.

On February 2, 1849, a merchant from Baltimore named Nehemiah Brush, bought a large portion of land at a government auction in Micanopy, which included 4,000 acres of the Arrendondo Spanish land grant that today encompasses McIntosh. His son, Colonel Charles Brush, along with his brother-in-law Eugene Van Ness and sister Julia Brush (née Van Ness) developed present-day McIntosh, into building lots and ten-acre plots for citrus crops.

The current town was platted in 1885, and named after the founding settler, Col. John McIntosh. His brother-in-law, Eugene Van Ness, filed the second plat in 1888 when Col. McIntosh became seriously ill. A post office has been in operation at McIntosh since 1887.

The "Town of McIntosh" was officially incorporated as a municipality on May 22, 1913.

== Geography ==
The Town of McIntosh is located in northern Marion Count. The town itself is bordered to the east by Orange Lake in Alachua County.

U.S. Route 441 passes through the town, leading south 19 miles (31 km) to Ocala, the county seat, and northwest 17 miles (27 km) to Gainesville.

According to the United States Census Bureau, McIntosh has a total area of 0.7 square miles (1.8 km^{2}), all land.

=== Climate ===
The climate in this area is characterized by hot, humid summers and generally mild winters. According to the Köppen climate classification, the Town of McIntosh has a humid subtropical climate zone (Cfa).

== Demographics ==
Historical population
Census	Pop.	Note	%±
1920	440		—
1930	272		−38.2%
1940	397		46.0%
1950	247		−37.8%
1960	258		4.5%
1970	287		11.2%
1980	404		40.8%
1990	411		1.7%
2000	453		10.2%
2010	452		−0.2%
2020	463		2.4%
U.S. Decennial Census

=== 2010 and 2020 census ===
McIntosh racial composition (Hispanics excluded from racial categories) (NH = Non-Hispanic)
Race	Pop 2010	Pop 2020	% 2010	% 2020
White (NH)	415	403	91.81%	87.04%
Black or African American (NH)	8	20	1.77%	4.32%
Native American or Alaska Native (NH)	1	0	0.22%	0.00%
Asian (NH)	3	1	0.66%	0.22%
Pacific Islander or Native Hawaiian (NH)	0	1	0.00%	0.22%
Some other race (NH)	0	0	0.00%	0.00%
Two or more races/Multiracial (NH)	5	22	1.11%	4.75%
Hispanic or Latino (any race)	20	16	4.42%	3.46%
Total	452	463		

As of the 2020 United States census, there were 463 people, 148 households, and 86 families residing in the town.

As of the 2010 United States census, there were 452 people, 142 households, and 101 families residing in the town.

=== 2000 census ===
At the 2000 census, there were 453 people, 227 households, and 133 families in the town. The population density was 650.8 inhabitants per square mile (251.3/km^{2}). There were 271 dwelling units at an average density of 389.4 per square mile (150.3/km^{2}). The racial makeup of the town was 96.91% White, 2.43% African American, 0.22% Native American, and 0.44% from two or more races. Hispanic or Latino of any race were 1.55%.

Of the 227 households in 2000, 11.9% had children under the age of 18 living with them, 52.9% were married couples living together, 5.3% had a female householder with no husband present, and 41.4% were non-families. 34.8% of households were one person and 16.3% were one person aged 65 or older. The average household size was 2.00 and the average family size was 2.53.

The age distribution in 2000 was 13.2% under the age of 18, 3.5% from 18 to 24, 19.2% from 25 to 44, 38.4% from 45 to 64, and 25.6% 65 or older. The median age was 53 years. For every 100 females, there were 81.2 males. For every 100 females age 18 and over, there were 81.1 males.

In 2000, the median household income was $36,250, and the median family income was $58,500. Males had a median income of $33,750 versus $20,500 for females. The per capita income for the town was $20,617. About 2.7% of families and 6.3% of the population were below the poverty line, including none of those under age 18 and 14.5% of those age 65 or over.
