= National Register of Historic Places listings in Marion County, Florida =

Location of Marion County in Florida

This is a list of the National Register of Historic Places listings in Marion County, Florida.

This is intended to be a complete list of the properties and districts on the National Register of Historic Places in Marion County, Florida, United States. The locations of National Register properties and districts for which the latitude and longitude coordinates are included below, may be seen in a map.

There are 33 properties and districts listed on the National Register in the county, including 1 National Historic Landmark.

This National Park Service list is complete through NPS recent listings posted March 21, 2025.

Contents: Counties in Florida (non-linked contain no National Register listings)
Alachua - Baker - Bay - Bradford - Brevard - Broward - Calhoun - Charlotte - Citrus - Clay - Collier - Columbia - DeSoto - Dixie - Duval - Escambia - Flagler - Franklin - Gadsden - Gilchrist - Glades - Gulf - Hamilton - Hardee - Hendry - Hernando - Highlands - Hillsborough (Tampa) - Holmes - Indian River - Jackson - Jefferson - Lafayette - Lake - Lee - Leon - Levy - Liberty - Madison - Manatee - Marion - Martin - Miami-Dade (Miami) - Monroe - Nassau - Okaloosa - Okeechobee - Orange - Osceola - Palm Beach - Pasco - Pinellas - Polk - Putnam - St. Johns - St. Lucie - Santa Rosa - Sarasota - Seminole - Sumter - Suwannee - Taylor - Union - Volusia - Wakulla - Walton - Washington

== Current listings ==
	Name on the Register	Image	Date listed	Location	City or town	Description
1	Armstrong House	Armstrong House	June 9, 2000 (#00000638)	18050 U.S. Route 301 North; 29°24′44″N 82°06′38″W	Citra	
2	Alfred Ayer House	Alfred Ayer House	July 13, 1993 (#93000590)	Alternate U.S. Routes 27/441 west of Oklawaha; 29°02′21″N 81°57′00″W	Ocklawaha	Part of the Early Residences of Rural Marion County MPS
3	Thomas R. Ayer House	Thomas R. Ayer House	July 13, 1993 (#93000588)	11885 Southeast 128th Place; 29°02′09″N 81°57′22″W	Ocklawaha	Part of the Early Residences of Rural Marion County MPS
4	Belleview School	Belleview School	March 25, 1999 (#99000372)	5343 Southeast Abshier Boulevard; 29°03′37″N 82°03′35″W	Belleview	
5	Gen. Robert Bullock House	Gen. Robert Bullock House	July 13, 1993 (#93000589)	Junction of Southeast 119th Court and Southeast 128 Place; 29°02′06″N 81°57′15″W	Ocklawaha	Part of the Early Residences of Rural Marion County MPS
6	Carr Family Cabin		February 28, 2017 (#100000683)	Nicotoon Lake, Ocala NF, FS Tract #C-2233; 28°59′56″N 81°42′36″W	Umatilla vicinity	More info here
7	Citra Methodist Episcopal Church-South	Citra Methodist Episcopal Church-South	March 5, 1998 (#98000177)	2010 Northeast 180th Street; 29°24′40″N 82°06′51″W	Citra	
8	Coca-Cola Bottling Plant	Coca-Cola Bottling Plant	May 4, 1979 (#79000682)	939 North Magnolia Avenue; 29°11′47″N 82°08′11″W	Ocala	
9	Dunnellon Boomtown Historic District	Dunnellon Boomtown Historic District	December 8, 1988 (#88002807)	Roughly bounded by McKinney Avenue, Illinois Street, Pennsylvania Avenue, and Cedar Street; 29°03′05″N 82°27′48″W	Dunnellon	
10	East Hall	East Hall	July 28, 1995 (#95000924)	307 Southeast 26th Terrace; 29°11′03″N 82°06′02″W	Ocala	
11	Federal Building, United States Post Office, and Court House	Federal Building, United States Post Office, and Court House	September 6, 2022 (#100008120)	207 NW 2nd St. 29°11′19″N 82°08′20″W	Ocala	
12	Robert W. Ferguson House	Robert W. Ferguson House	March 23, 1995 (#95000288)	Off County Road 326, east of its junction with U.S. Route 27; 29°17′00″N 82°17′13″W	Emathla	Part of the Early Residences of Rural Marion County MPS
13	Fort King Site	Fort King Site	February 24, 2004 (#04000320)	Address Restricted; 29°11′20″N 82°04′56″W	Ocala	A National Historic Landmark
14	James Riley Josselyn House	James Riley Josselyn House	July 13, 1993 (#93000591)	13845 Alternate U.S. Route 27; 29°01′20″N 81°54′30″W	Eastlake Weir	Part of the Early Residences of Rural Marion County MPS
15	Kerr City Historic District	Kerr City Historic District	September 29, 1995 (#95001150)	South of County Road 316, north of Lake Kerr; 29°22′29″N 81°46′39″W	Fort McCoy	
16	Lake Lillian Neighborhood Historic District	Lake Lillian Neighborhood Historic District	August 20, 1999 (#99001012)	Roughly bounded by Lillian Circle, Southeast Stetson Road, Southeast Mimosa Road, Southeast Earp Road, and the CSX railroad tracks 29°03′44″N 82°03′10″W	Belleview	
17	Lake Weir Yacht Club	Lake Weir Yacht Club	April 22, 1993 (#93000319)	New York Avenue; 29°01′15″N 81°54′50″W	Eastlake Weir	
18	Marion Hotel	Marion Hotel	October 16, 1980 (#80000955)	108 North Magnolia Avenue; 29°11′16″N 82°08′14″W	Ocala	
19	McIntosh Historic District	McIntosh Historic District	November 18, 1983 (#83003550)	Roughly bounded by the railroad right-of-way, 10th Street, and Avenues C and H 29°26′57″N 82°13′11″W	McIntosh	
20	Morgan-Townsend House	Morgan-Townsend House	September 26, 2013 (#13000794)	13535 N. FL 19; 29°21′00″N 81°44′03″W	Salt Springs	
21	Mount Zion A.M.E. Church	Mount Zion A.M.E. Church	December 17, 1979 (#79000683)	623 South Magnolia Avenue; 29°10′52″N 82°08′13″W	Ocala	
22	Ocala Historic Commercial District	Ocala Historic Commercial District	June 3, 1999 (#99000656)	Roughly bounded by 1st Street NW, 1st Avenue SE, 2nd Street SW, and 1st Avenue SW; 29°11′08″N 82°08′12″W	Ocala	
23	Ocala Historic District	Ocala Historic District	January 12, 1984 (#84000912)	Roughly bounded by Broadway, Southeast 8th Street, Silver Springs Place, and Southeast 3rd, 13th, and Watula Avenues; 29°11′00″N 82°07′42″W	Ocala	
24	Ocala Union Station	Ocala Union Station	December 22, 1997 (#97001557)	531 Northeast First Avenue; 29°11′31″N 82°08′09″W	Ocala	
25	Old Fessenden Academy Historic District	Old Fessenden Academy Historic District	September 29, 1994 (#94001141)	4200 Northwest 90th Street; 29°16′52″N 82°11′28″W	Ocala	
26	Orange Springs Methodist Episcopal Church and Cemetery	Orange Springs Methodist Episcopal Church and Cemetery	December 22, 1988 (#88002805)	State Road 315 and Church Street; 29°30′09″N 81°56′44″W	Orange Springs	
27	T. W. Randall House	T. W. Randall House	April 6, 1995 (#95000289)	11685 Northeast County Highway C-314; 29°13′57″N 81°57′39″W	Silver Springs	Part of the Early Residences of Rural Marion County MPS
28	The Ritz Apartment	The Ritz Apartment	August 21, 1986 (#86001722)	1205 East Silver Springs Boulevard; 29°11′13″N 82°07′05″W	Ocala	
29	Silver Springs	Silver Springs	November 19, 2011 (#100004353)	5656 East Silver Springs Blvd. 29°13′05″N 82°03′16″W	Silver Springs	
30	E. C. Smith House	E. C. Smith House	May 24, 1990 (#90000806)	507 Northeast 8th Avenue; 29°11′32″N 82°07′47″W	Ocala	
31	James W. Townsend House	James W. Townsend House	October 17, 1988 (#88001849)	Main and Spring Streets; 29°30′25″N 81°56′39″W	Orange Springs	
32	Tuscawilla Park Historic District	Tuscawilla Park Historic District	March 30, 1988 (#87002015)	Northeast Fourth Street, Sanchez Avenue, Second Street, Tuscawilla Avenue, and Watula Street; 29°11′21″N 82°07′57″W	Ocala	
33	West Ocala Historic District	West Ocala Historic District	June 27, 2002 (#02000682)	Roughly Northwest 4th Street, West Silver Springs Boulevard, and Northwest 12th Avenue; 29°11′17″N 82°08′47″W	Ocala	

== See also ==
- List of National Historic Landmarks in Florida
- National Register of Historic Places listings in Florida
