= Ayer House =

Ayer House may refer to:

- Alfred Ayer House, Oklawaha, Florida
- Thomas R. Ayer House, Oklawaha, Florida
- Caleb R. Ayer House, Cornish, Maine
- Albert Ayer House, Winchester, Massachusetts
- Thomas Ayer House, Winchester, Massachusetts
- W. B. Ayer House, Portland, Oregon, listed on the National Register of Historic Places
- Ayer–Shea House, Portland, Oregon
