= Early Residences of Rural Marion County MPS =

- U.S. National Register of Historic Places
- Location within Florida Location within the United States
- Location: Marion County, Florida
- Coordinates: 29°11′16″N 82°7′50″W
- MPS: Early Residences of Rural Marion County, Florida
- NRHP reference No.: 64500103

These buildings were added to the National Register of Historic Places as part of the Early Residences of Rural Marion County multiple property submission.

Resource name	Also known as	Address	City	County	Added
Alfred Ayer House		US Alt. 27/441 West of Oklawaha	Oklawaha	Marion County	July 13, 1993
Thomas R. Ayer House		11885 Southeast 128th Place	Oklawaha	Marion County	July 13, 1993
Gen. Robert Bullock House		Junction of Southeast 119th Court and Southeast 128 Place	Oklawaha	Marion County	July 13, 1993
Robert W. Ferguson House		Off County Road 326, east of junction with US 27	Emathla	Marion County	March 23, 1995
James Riley Josselyn House		13845 Alt. US 27	East Lake Weir	Marion County	July 13, 1993
T. W. Randall House		11685 Northeast County Highway C-314	Silver Springs	Marion County	April 6, 1995
