= Tauscher Cronacher Professional Engineers =

- Company type: Private company
- Industry: Engineering
- Founded: 1957
- Headquarters: Baldwin, NY
- Area served: United States and Canada
- Key people: Richard Koller (COO)
- Website: Tauscher Cronacher Professional Engineers

Tauscher Cronacher Professional Engineers is a New York-based provider of building related engineering services for the residential and commercial sectors, primarily building inspection services. It is the first professional engineering firm in the U.S. to set standards for home inspections and building safety.

== Milestones ==
- 1957 - Tauscher Engineers is established.
- 1986 – Warren Cronacher purchases Tauscher Engineers and established Tauscher Cronacher Professional Engineers.
- 1989 - Warren Cronacher, Arthur Tauscher and H.Alan Mooney found the National Academy of Building Inspections Engineers (NABIE). NABIE is an affinity group of The National Society of Professional Engineers (NPSE) and controls the certification for building inspection engineers.

== Operations ==
Tauscher Cronacher has five main operational units: residential, commercial, association services, environmental services and forensic.
