= Gen. Robert Bullock House =

Historic house in Florida, United States

- U.S. National Register of Historic Places
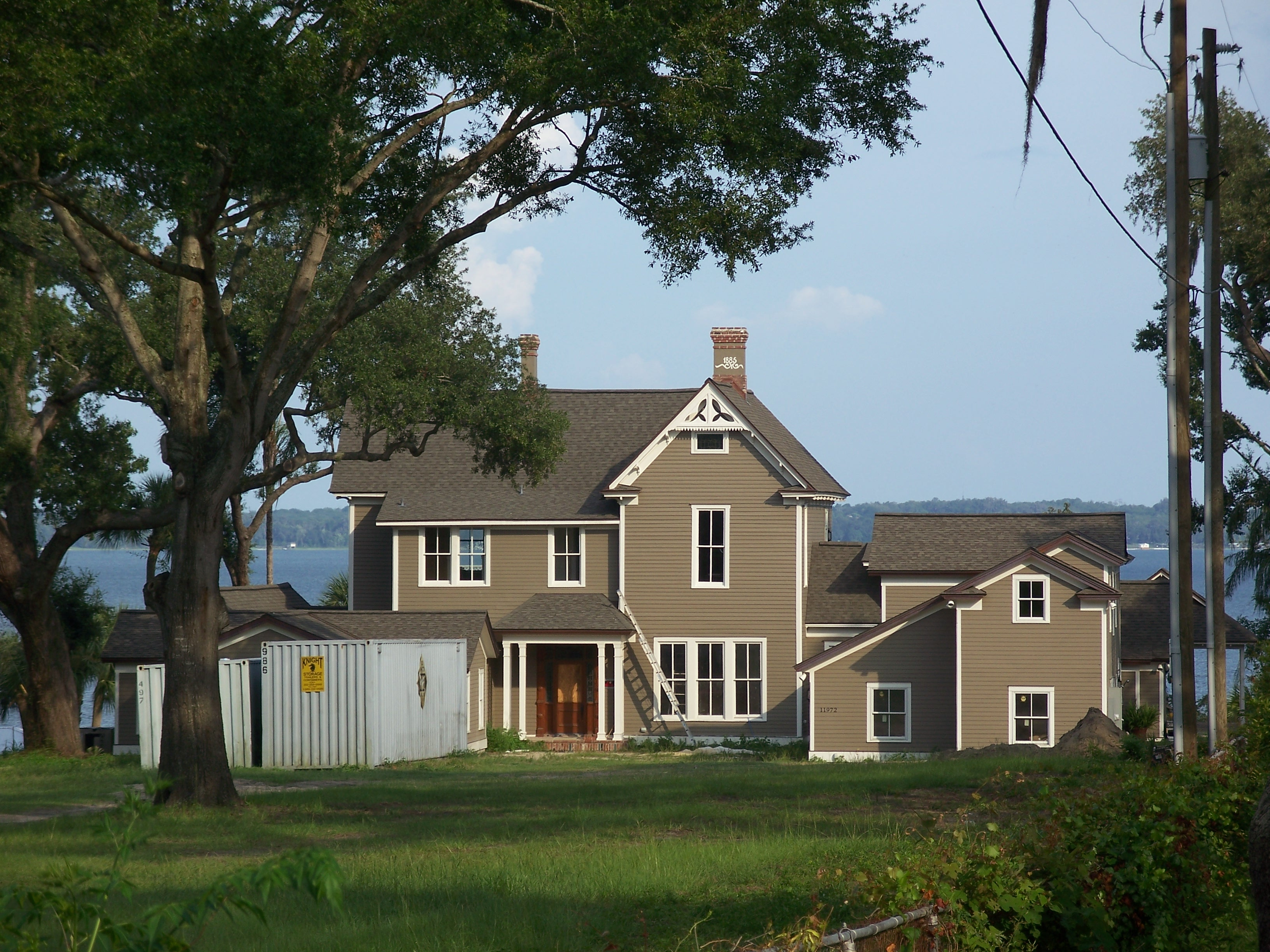

- Location within Florida Location within the United States
- Location: Oklawaha, Marion County
- Nearest city: Ocala
- Coordinates: 29°2′6″N 81°57′15″W
- Built: 1885
- Architectural style: Frame Vernacular, Folk Victorian
- MPS: Early Residences of Rural Marion County MPS
- NRHP reference No.: 93000589
- Added to NRHP: July 13, 1993

The Gen. Robert Bullock House is an historic house located at the junction of Southeast 119th Court and Southeast 128 Place in Oklawaha, Florida. The house was the residence of Robert Bullock. The house was added to the National Register of Historic Places on July 13, 1993.
