= Commercial area =

Areas with mostly commercial buildings

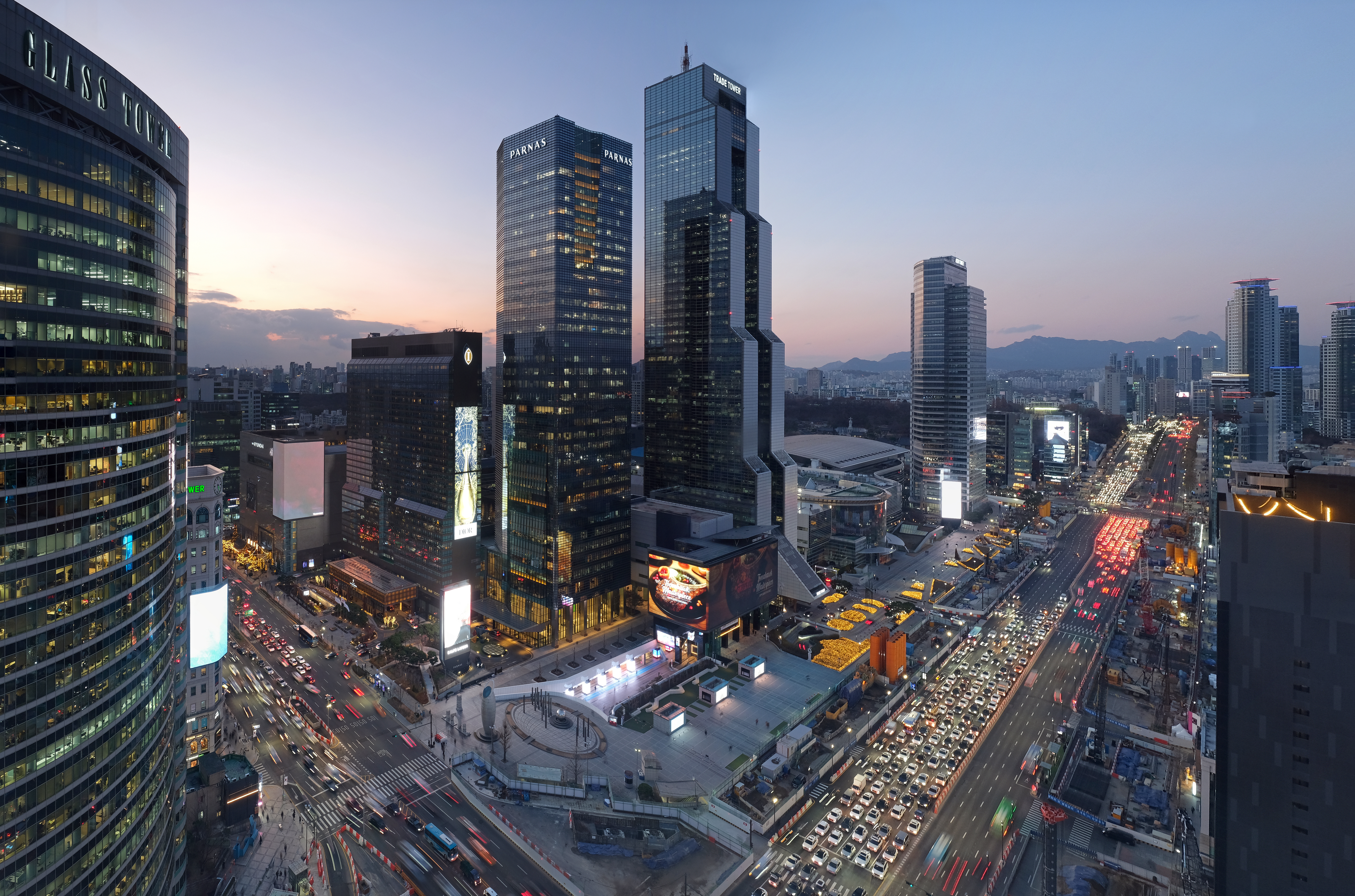
Main Street in Gangnam District of Seoul, South Korea

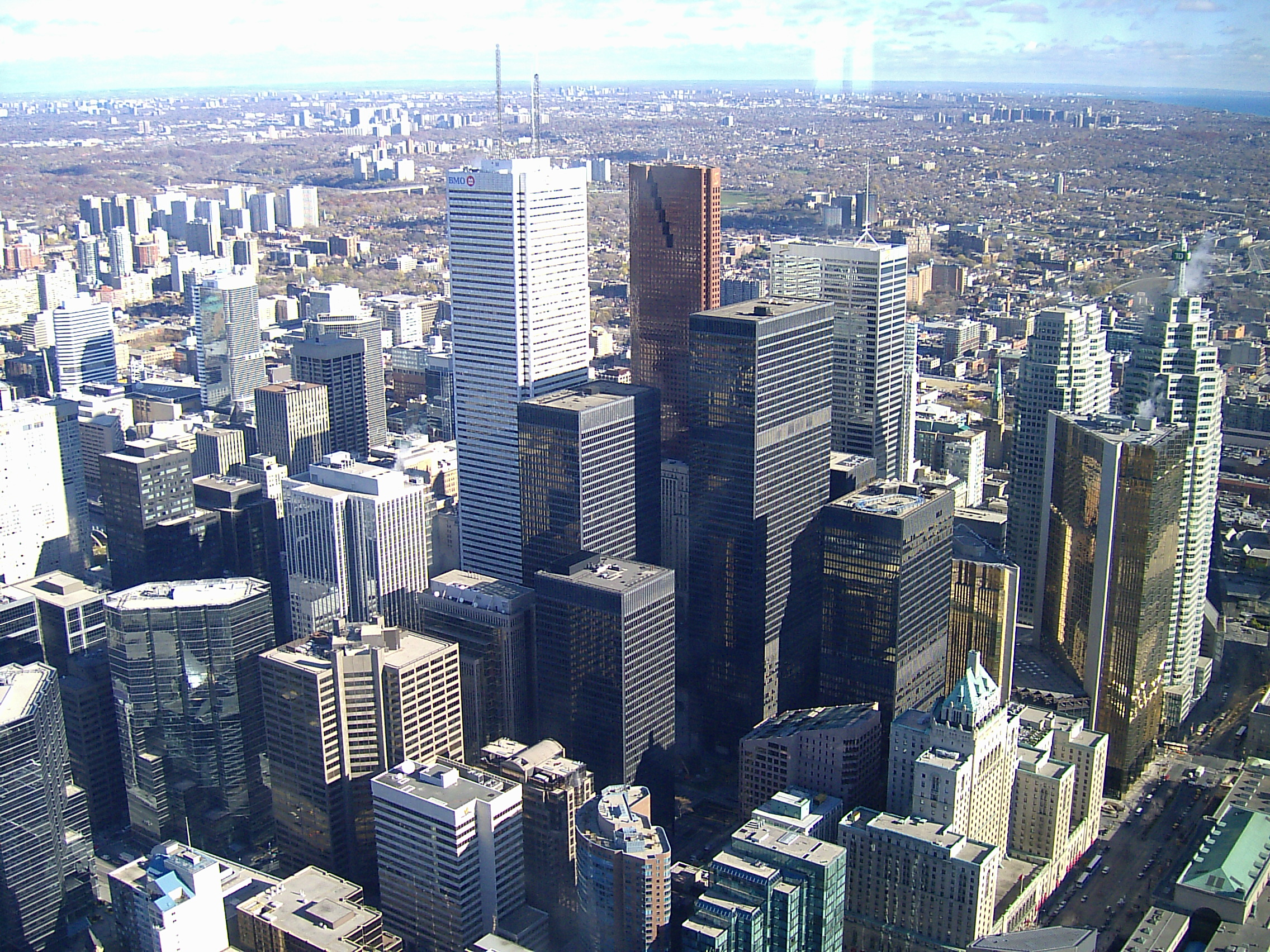
Aerial view of the Financial District in Downtown Toronto

A commercial area, commercial district, or commercial zone is a part of a city or neighborhoods primarily composed of commercial buildings, including districts such as downtowns, central business districts, and financial districts, as well as commercial developments such as shopping centers and strip malls. Commercial activity includes the buying and selling of goods and services in retail businesses, wholesale buying and selling, financial establishments, and a wide variety of activities that are broadly classified as business activities." Although commercial land often occupies a smaller share of urban land than residential areas, they are extremely important to a community's economy. They provide employment, facilitate economic activity and the flow of goods, services, and capital, and often serve many other roles important to the community, such as public gathering and cultural events.

A commercial area is real estate intended for use by for-profit businesses, such as office complexes, shopping malls, service stations, bars and restaurants. It may be purchased outright by a developer for future projects or leased through a real estate broker. This type of property falls somewhere between residential and industrial property. Practically every incomer must grant permission to build a new office complex or other profit-making business, the city government must determine that the chosen area is indeed commercial area. If the zones which separate commercial, industrial, and residential area are clearly zoned for commercial use, the city will allow the sale to proceed for the stated use. If any part of the property extends into a residential or industrial zone, however, then the buyer must seek a 'variance', special permission to cross over a zone boundary.

A commercial area can be held by real estate agents who treat it the same as residential areas. Signs advertising the availability and size of the real estate can be erected, and arrangements can be made to buy or lease smaller lots. Sellers may also agree to make improvements to the land, such as grading off uneven spots or clearing out unwanted trees. A professional developer may purchase huge swatches of this type of property simply to guarantee its availability for later projects.

== Terminology ==
=== English ===
In the United Kingdom, commercial districts that are primarily for shopping are called high streets. In North America, in smaller towns and cities there is often only one main commercial district, which is located on the main street. In larger cities and towns there may be multiple commercial districts, often with more specialized functions. If a city has one large central area of offices and professional buildings, this is called the Central Business District or CBD (term used especially, but not exclusively, in Australian and New Zealand English), or downtown (North American English with the exception of Liverpool, England, who also uniquely use the term 'downtown' ). "CBD" and "downtown" usually refer to centrally located areas of a city and are of predominate importance within their city, which differentiates them from other commercial districts. The financial district of a city is the specific area of either a larger CBD or downtown or separate zone and would typically house a stock exchange or several bank headquarters. Likewise, city centre is sometimes used as a synonym for CBD or downtown, but often the geographical centre of a city not a commercial district. Often the centre of a city in older cities has many historic, institutional, or cultural areas.

=== Other languages ===
Most languages do not have a direct cognate for commercial district, but will have a related term such as the French quartier d'affaires ("business quarter"), or the Japanese shōtengai (literally, "commerce shop street").

== History ==
The workplace grew up in tandem with the city, which by the late 19th century was often perceived as polluted, congested and riven by social and economic strife. Although the city continued its rise until the mid-20th century, the forces that would spell its decline had been gathering steam over many decades. Commuter rail, streetcars and eventually the automobile allowed a widening segment of residents to move out of city centers. While at first most people commuted back to industrial and commercial jobs downtown, eventually many employers followed suit, moving to suburban communities in search of educated workers, cheap land, fewer unions and a leafy suburban image. The now-familiar commercial landscape of office parks and corporate campuses was born.

== Zoning laws ==
Cities often use zoning laws to prevent conflicts between residential homeowners and businesses. Land designated as a commercial area is rarely located in the middle of residential zones. City planners encourage businesses to congregate along busier streets and central downtown areas. This helps to keep traffic to these sites manageable. Some areas of the city may be designated for 'mixed usage', which means some commercial areas may be used for residential purposes. A quaint downtown shopping area with apartments would be an example of mixed usage. Commercial areas definition may include industrial usage as well, although zoning laws still regulate the level of industry permitted. Heavier industries often purchase property on the fringes of cities or in unincorporated areas. Some commercial zones in the city do allow for light industrial usage, usually smaller factories with minimal emissions and transportation needs.

Some examples of commercial area buildings are:

- Arena
- Auditorium
- Bank
- Chain store
- Gas station
- Grocery store
- Hotel
- Movie theater
- Office
- Pharmacy
- Restaurant
- Shophouse
- Shopping mall
- Car Dealer
- Discount stores
- Warehouse clubs

== See also ==
=== Related terms ===
- Central Business District, downtown, city centre
- high street, main street
- shōtengai

=== Specific usage of "commercial district" as a name ===
- Boneyfiddle Commercial District, Portsmouth, Ohio
- Broadway Theater and Commercial District, Los Angeles, California
- Clematis Street Historic Commercial District, West Palm Beach, Florida
- Liverpool Commercial District, Liverpool, UK
- Ocala Historic Commercial District, Ocala, Florida
- Titusville Commercial District, Titusville, Florida

=== Other ===
- List of leading shopping streets and districts by city
- Joel Wachs, Los Angeles City Council member who authored law requiring commercial developers to set aside funds for art
