= United Hebrews of Ocala =

Historic Reform Jewish synagogue in Ocala, Florida, US

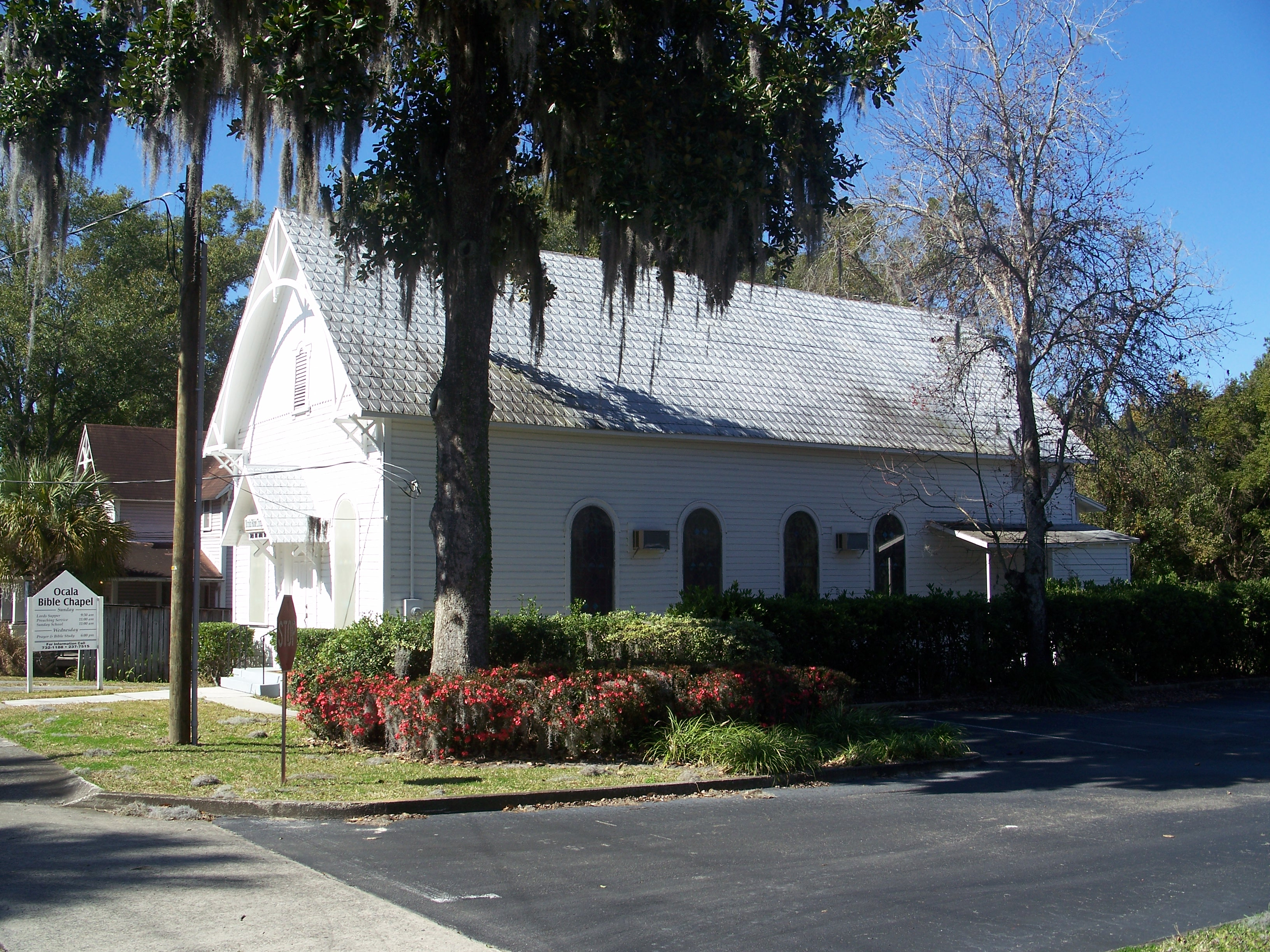

- Location in Florida

Religion
- Affiliation: Reform Judaism (former); Evangelicalism (former); Baptistism (former)
- Ecclesiastical or organizational status: Synagogue (1888–1976); Chapel (1978–2011); Church (2011–c. 2020)
- Status: Closed (as a synagogue); Repurposed

Location
- Location: 729 N.E. 2nd Street, Ocala, Marion County, Florida
- Country: United States
- Interactive map of United Hebrews of Ocala
- Coordinates: 29°11′19″N 82°7′50″W

Architecture
- Type: Synagogue
- Style: Carpenter Gothic
- Established: 1873 (as a congregation)
- Completed: 1888
- United Hebrews of Ocala
- U.S. Historic district – Contributing property
- Part of: Tuscawilla Park Historic District (ID87002015)
- Designated CP: March 30, 1988

The United Hebrews of Ocala is an historic former Reform Jewish synagogue building located at 729 N.E. 2nd Street, in the Tuscawilla Park Historic District of Ocala, Marion County, Florida, in the United States.

The building was used as a synagogue from 1888 until 1976. It has subsequently been used as a Christian place of worship.

== Jewish history ==
The historic Carpenter Gothic building was completed in 1888 and was one of the first synagogues in Florida. The building is a contributing property to the Tuscawilla Park Historic District. It is among the oldest synagogue buildings in the United States.

The congregation was founded in 1873 and, since 1963, has been known as Temple B'nai Darom. In 1975 a new congregation, Temple Beth Shalom, split from the original congregation, around the time that Temple B’nai Darom began to worship at 49 Banyan Course in Silver Springs Shores. In 2016, it was proposed that the two congregations amalgamate. However, it stalled. Since 2018, Temple B'nai Darom have worshiped at 7465 SW 38th Street. Since 2022, Temple Beth Shalom worship at 6140 SW 78th Avenue Road, having previously worshiped at 8th Avenue in Ocala. Their building, called the Ocala Tree of Life Sanctuary, is an interfaith place of worship for Temple Beth Shalom and the First Congregational United Church of Christ.

== Building adaptation ==
In 1978, the congregation sold the historic building on 2nd Street and it was initially used by the Ocala Bible Chapel, a non-denominational Christian congregation. The congregation used the historic building until 2011, and have since worshiped in a building located at 2810 NE 14th Street in Ocala. In 2011, the historic building was sold to the Good News Baptist Church of Ocala, a Pentecostal Christian congregation of the Baptists, that is part of the Good New Baptist Network. As of January 2024, this congregation worshiped at 5600 SE 24th Street, in Ocala.

== See also ==
- History of the Jews in South Florida
- List of the oldest synagogues in the United States

== Gallery ==
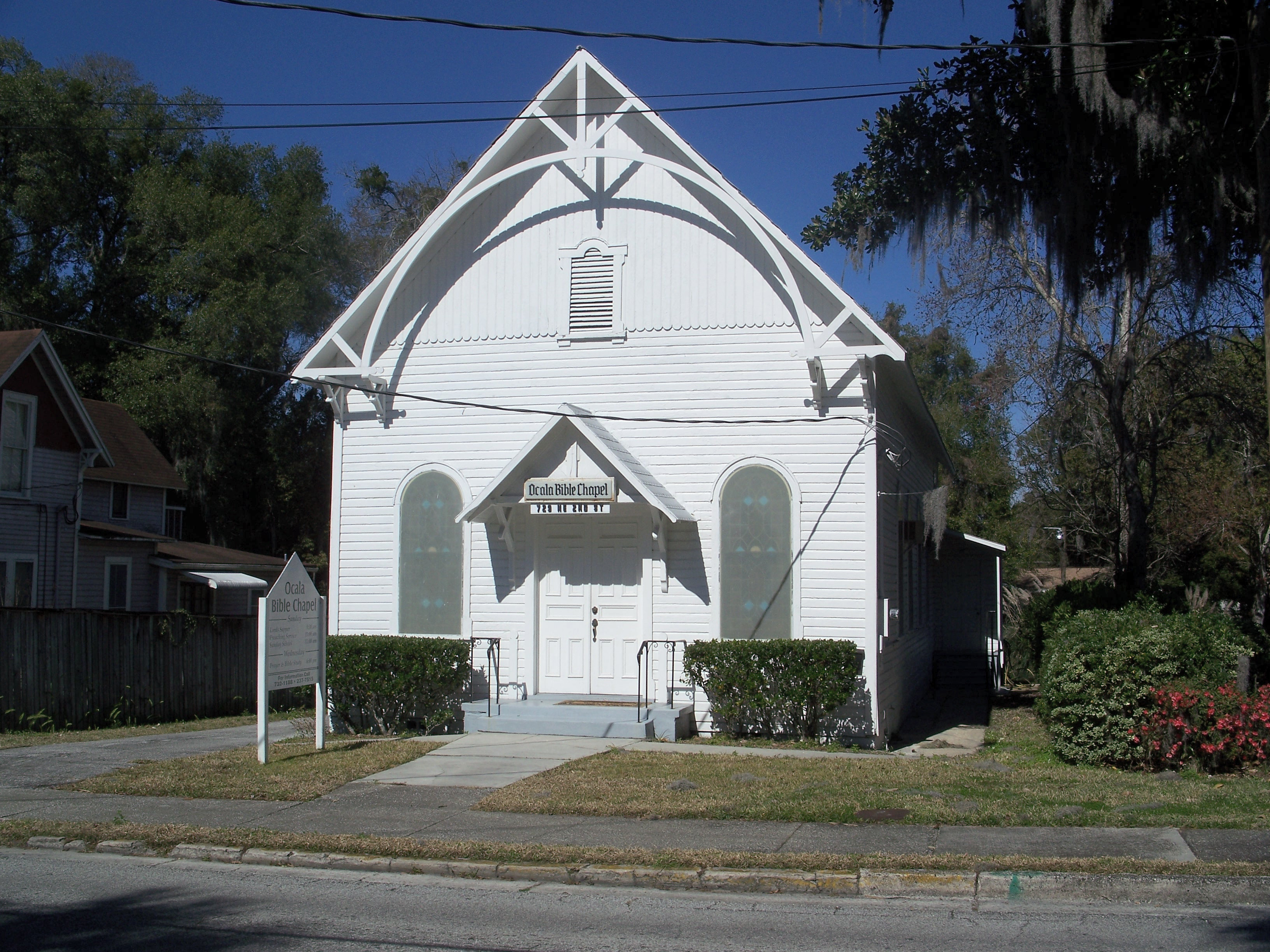

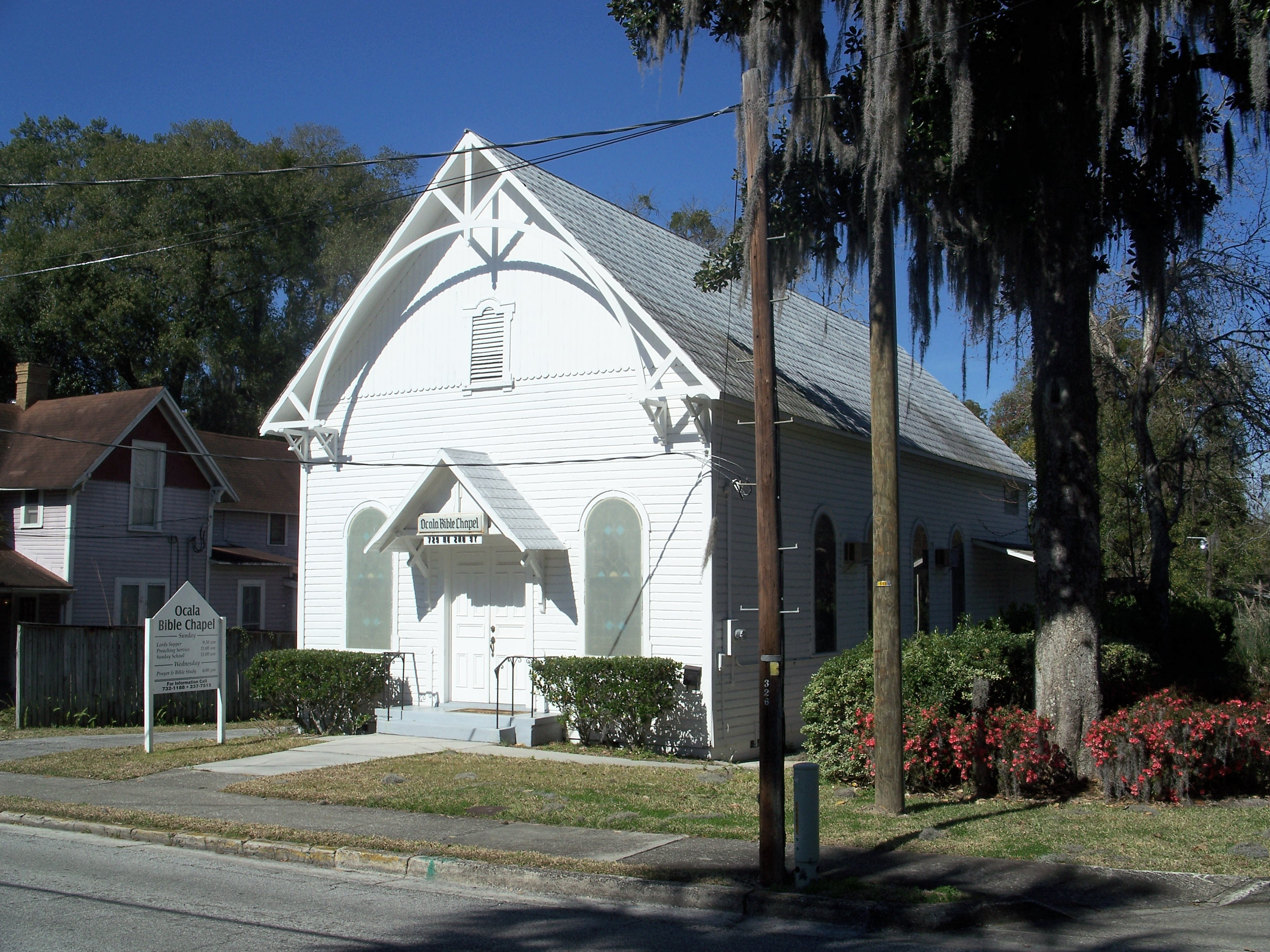

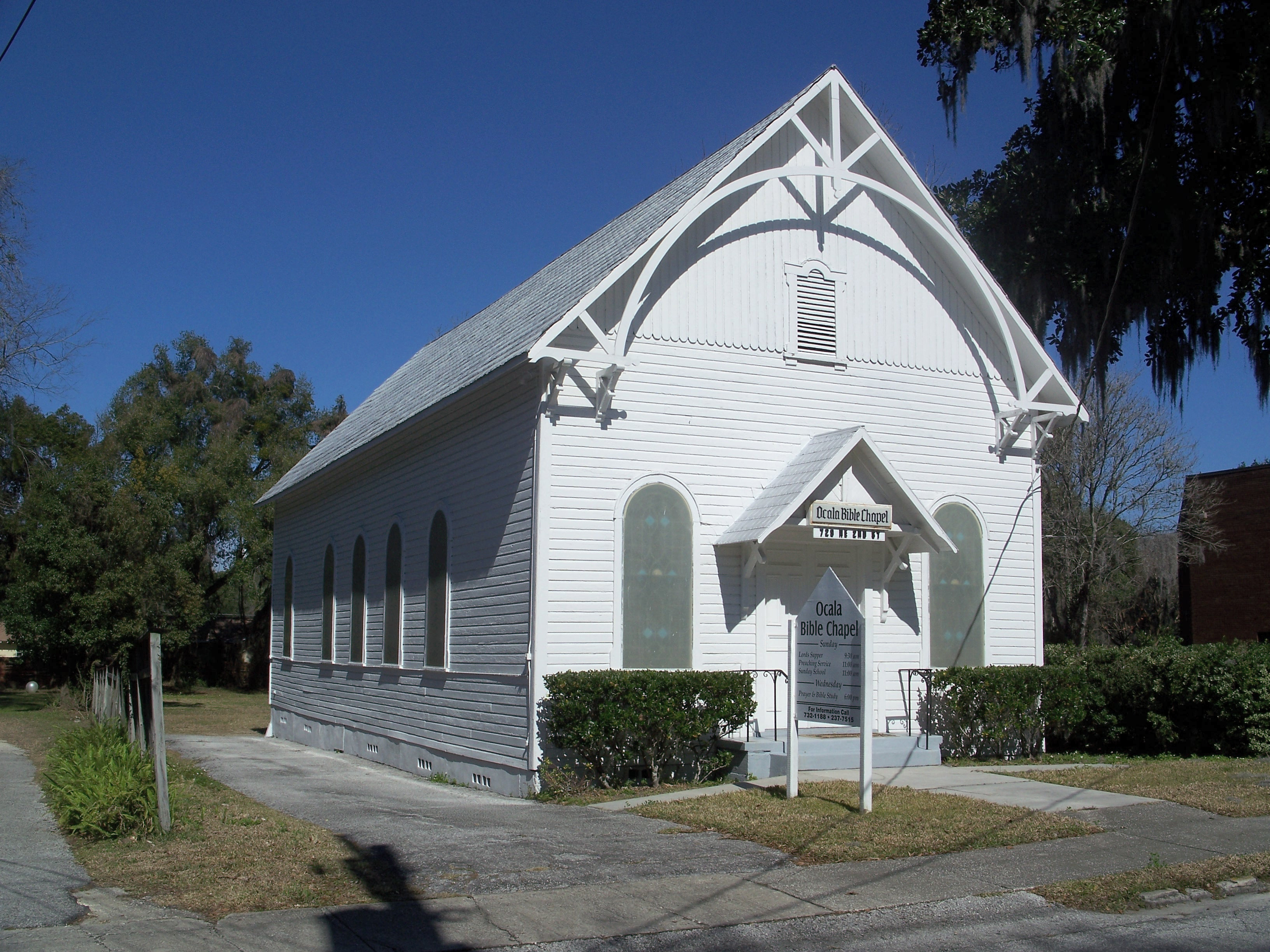
