= Silver Springs Shores East, Florida =

Silver Springs Shores East
- Census-designated place
- Location within Florida Location within the United States
- Coordinates: 29°02′46″N 81°52′42″W
- Country: United States
- State: Florida
- County: Marion

Area
  - Total: 8.22 sq mi (21.28 km^{2})
  - Land: 7.63 sq mi (19.76 km^{2})
  - Water: 0.58 sq mi (1.51 km^{2})
- Elevation: 118 ft (36 m)

Population (2020)
  - Total: 1,210
  - Density: 158.6/sq mi (61.22/km^{2})
- Time zone: UTC-5 (Eastern (EST))
  - Summer (DST): UTC-4 (EDT)
- ZIP Code: 32179 (Ocklawaha)
- Area code: 352
- FIPS code: 12-66179
- GNIS feature ID: 2805200

Silver Springs Shores East is a census-designated place (CDP) in southeastern Marion County, Florida, United States. It is bordered to the west by Ocklawaha and is 20 miles (32 km) southeast of Ocala, the Marion county seat.

Silver Springs Shores East was first listed as a CDP for the 2020 census, at which time it had a population of 1,210. It is part of the Ocala, Florida Metropolitan Statistical Area.

== Demographics ==
Historical population
Census	Pop.	Note	%±
2020	1,210		—
U.S. Decennial Census

Silver Springs Shores East first appeared as a census designated place in the 2020 U.S. census.

=== 2020 census ===
As of the 2020 census, Silver Springs Shores East had a population of 1,210. The median age was 47.5 years. 20.2% of residents were under the age of 18 and 25.5% of residents were 65 years of age or older. For every 100 females there were 100.0 males, and for every 100 females age 18 and over there were 95.7 males age 18 and over.

There were 463 households in Silver Springs Shores East, of which 27.6% had children under the age of 18 living in them. Of all households, 57.2% were married-couple households, 17.5% were households with a male householder and no spouse or partner present, and 17.5% were households with a female householder and no spouse or partner present. About 19.6% of all households were made up of individuals and 12.3% had someone living alone who was 65 years of age or older.

There were 525 housing units, of which 11.8% were vacant. The homeowner vacancy rate was 2.4% and the rental vacancy rate was 11.8%. 2.1% of residents lived in urban areas, while 97.9% lived in rural areas.

Racial composition as of the 2020 census
Race	Number	Percent
White	1,029	85.0%
Black or African American	53	4.4%
American Indian and Alaska Native	4	0.3%
Asian	6	0.5%
Native Hawaiian and Other Pacific Islander	1	0.1%
Some other race	25	2.1%
Two or more races	92	7.6%
Hispanic or Latino (of any race)	70	5.8%
