= Robert W. Ferguson House =

Historic house in Florida, United States

- U.S. National Register of Historic Places
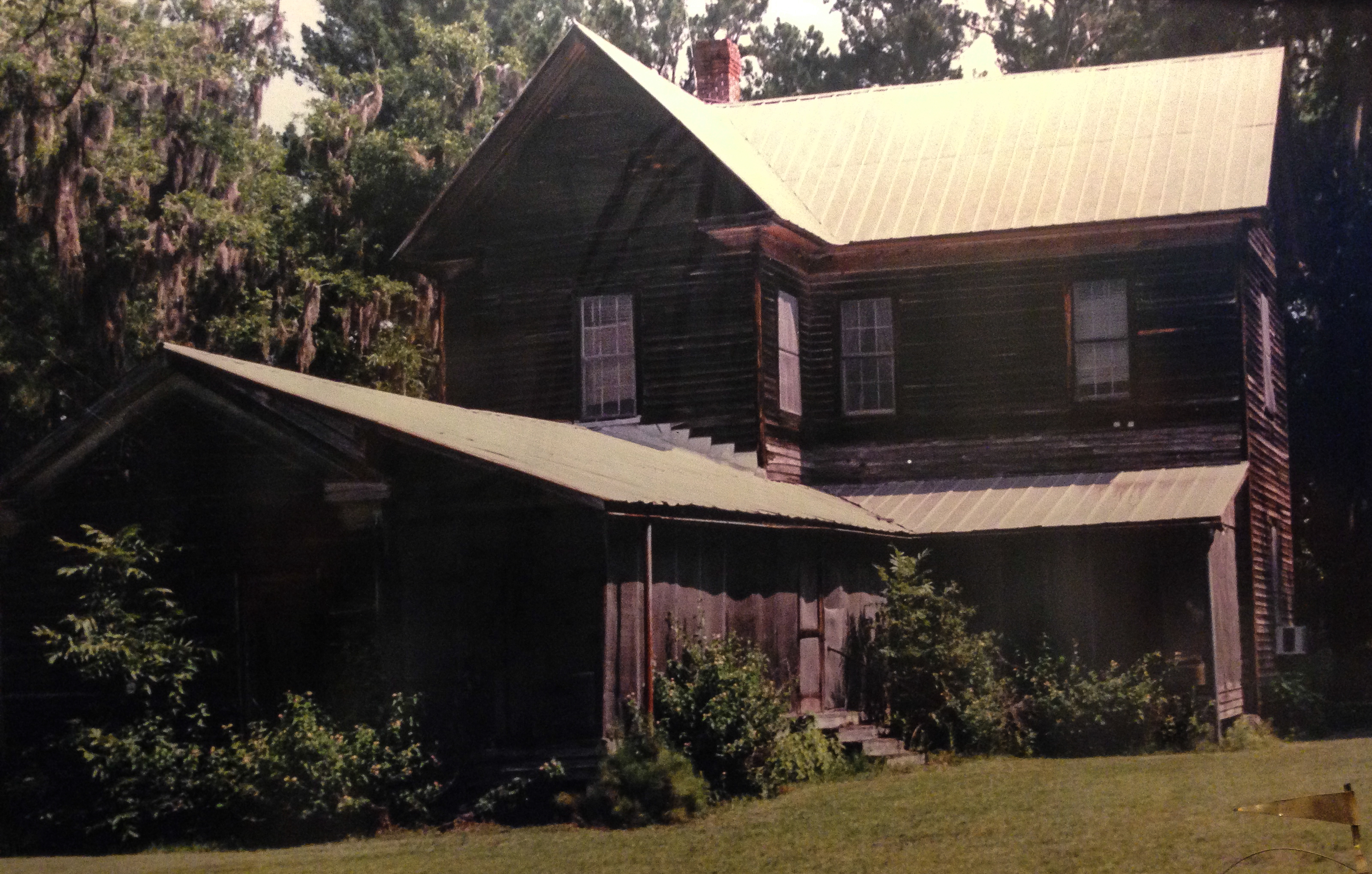

- Location within Florida Location within the United States
- Location: Emathla, Florida
- Coordinates: 29°17′0″N 82°17′13″W
- MPS: Early Residences of Rural Marion County MPS
- NRHP reference No.: 95000288
- Added to NRHP: March 23, 1995

The Robert W. Ferguson House is a historic home in Emathla, Florida. It is located off CR 326, east of the US 27 junction.

On March 23, 1995, it was added to the U.S. National Register of Historic Places.
