= Kerr City Historic District =

Historic district in Florida, United States

- U.S. National Register of Historic Places
- U.S. Historic district
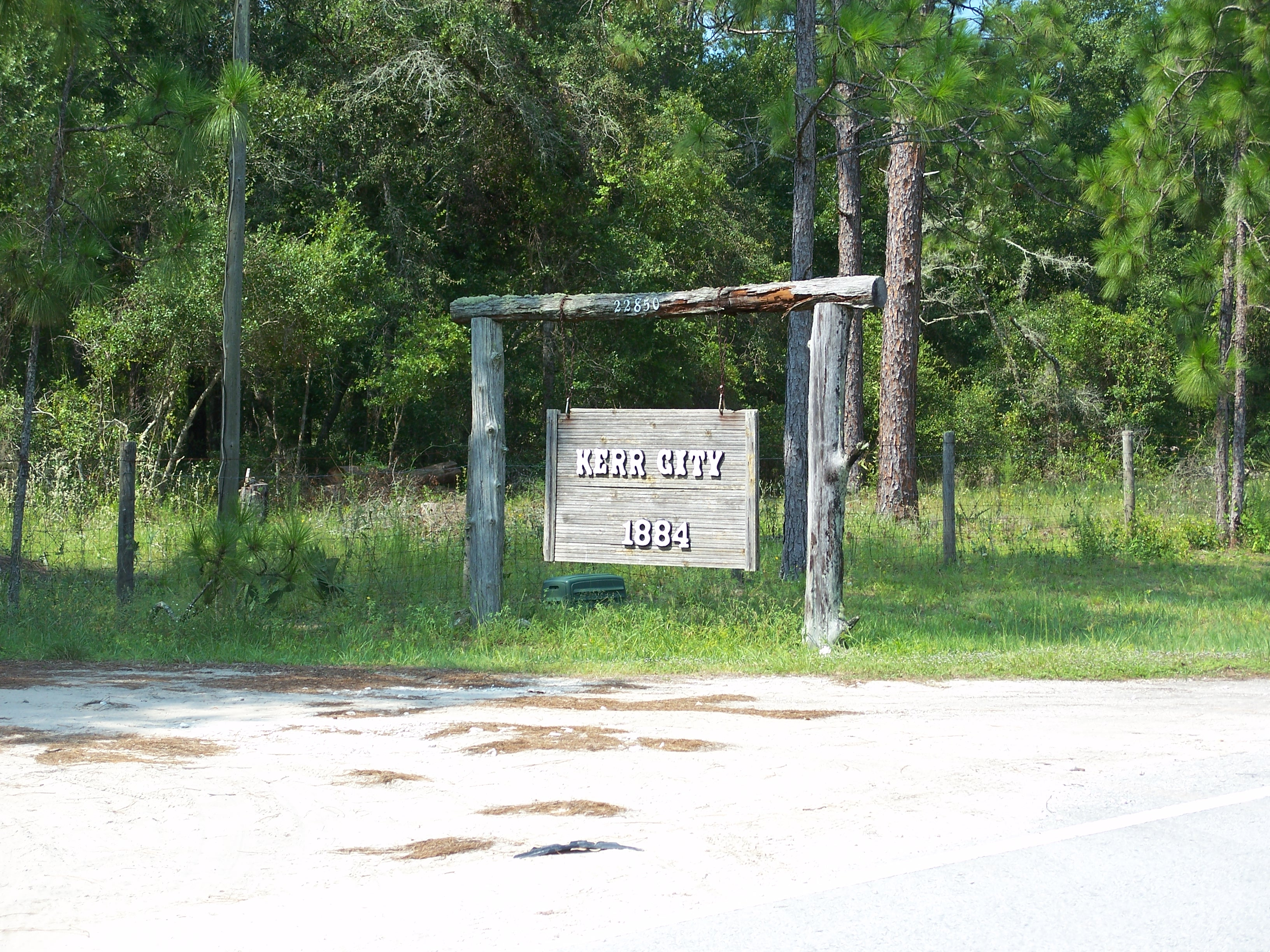
- Sign at the entrance to the district

- Location within Florida Location within the United States
- Location: Marion County, Florida United States
- Nearest city: Salt Springs
- Coordinates: 29°22′29″N 81°46′39″W
- Area: 41 acres (170,000 m^{2})
- NRHP reference No.: 95001150
- Added to NRHP: September 29, 1995

The Kerr City Historic District is a U.S. Historic District (designated as such on September 29, 1995) located east of Fort McCoy, Florida. The district is south of CR 316, and north of Lake Kerr. It contains 17 buildings and 1 structure.

== Gallery ==
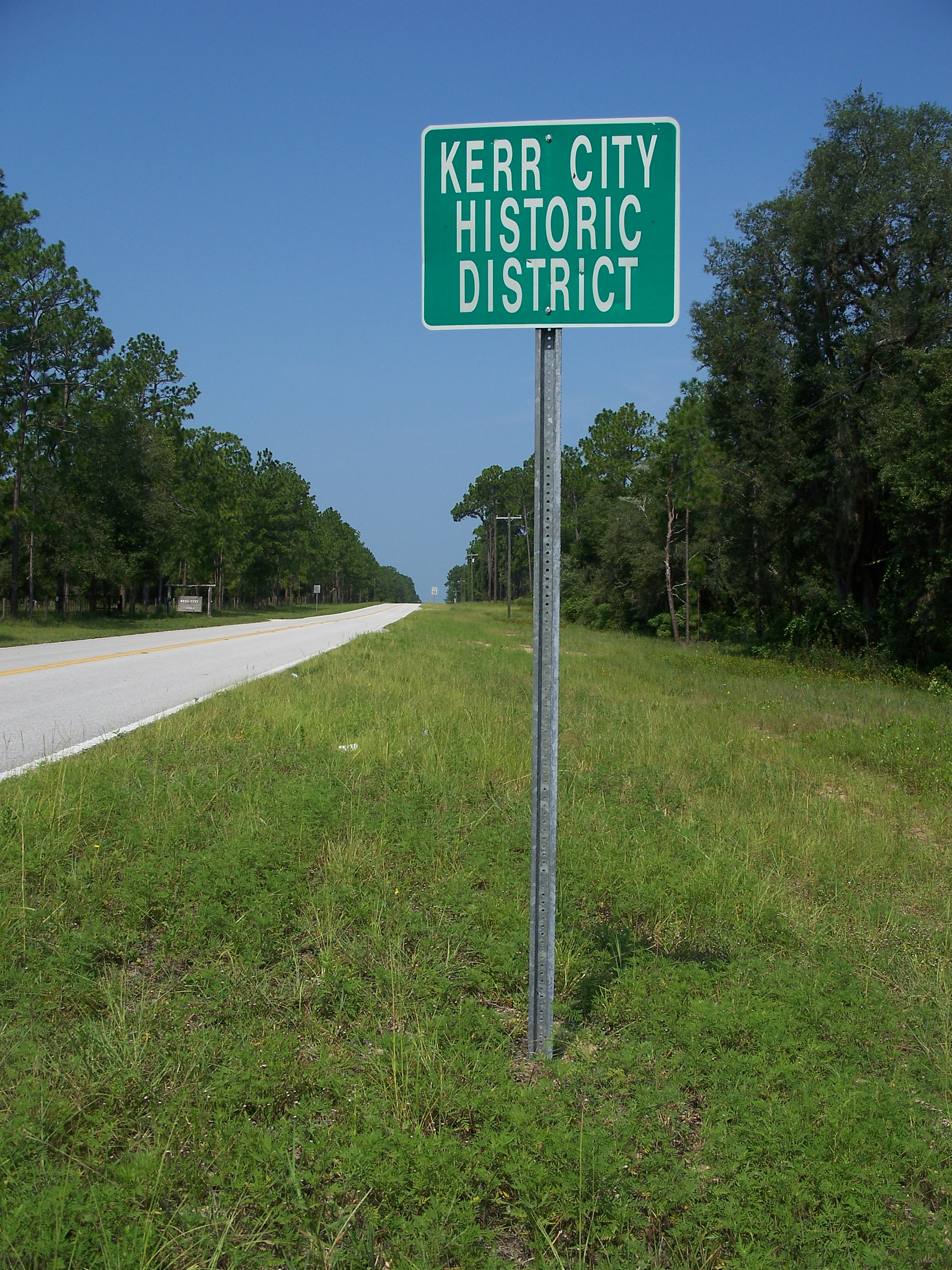
Eastern entry into the district

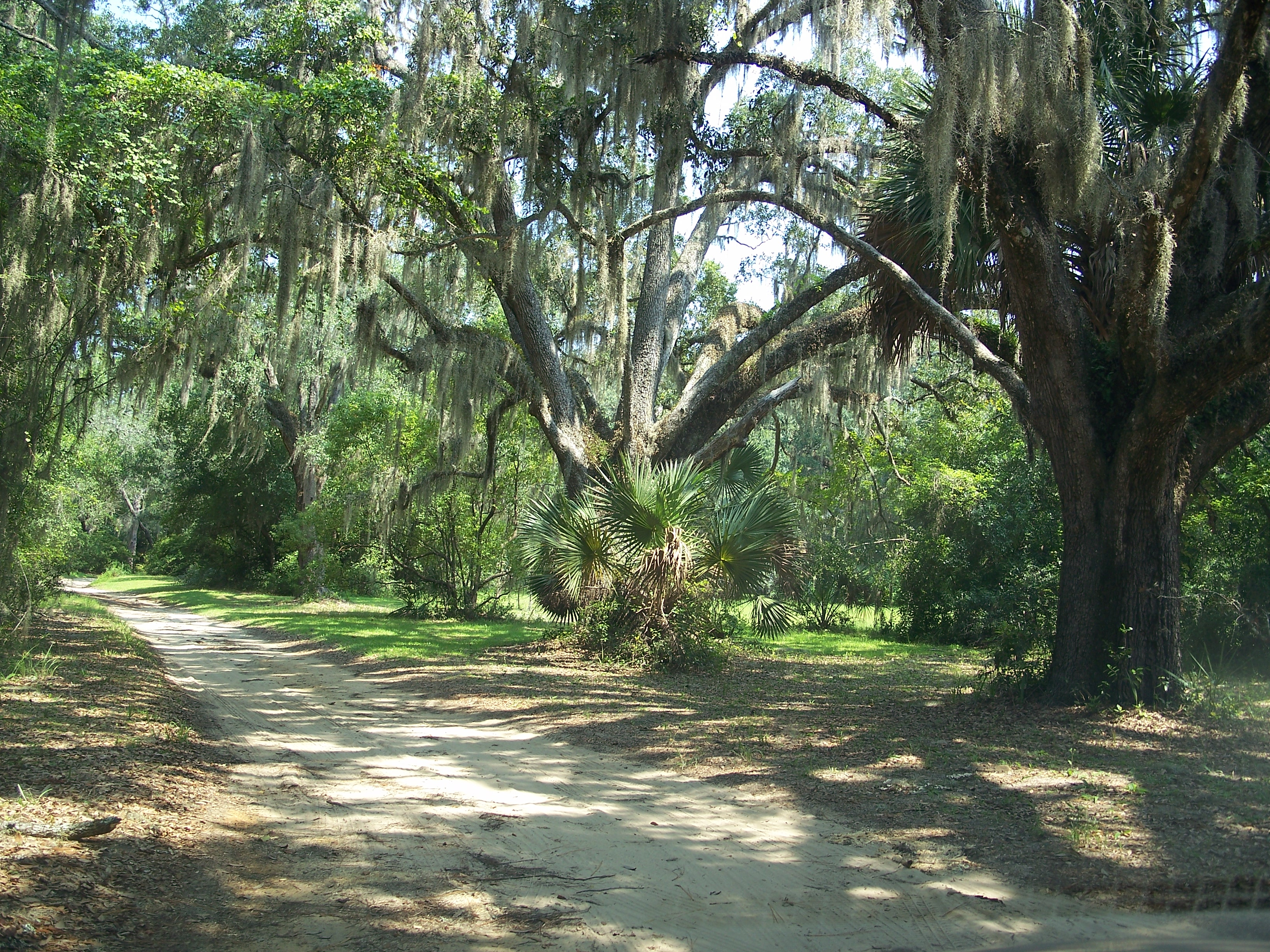
Road through the district

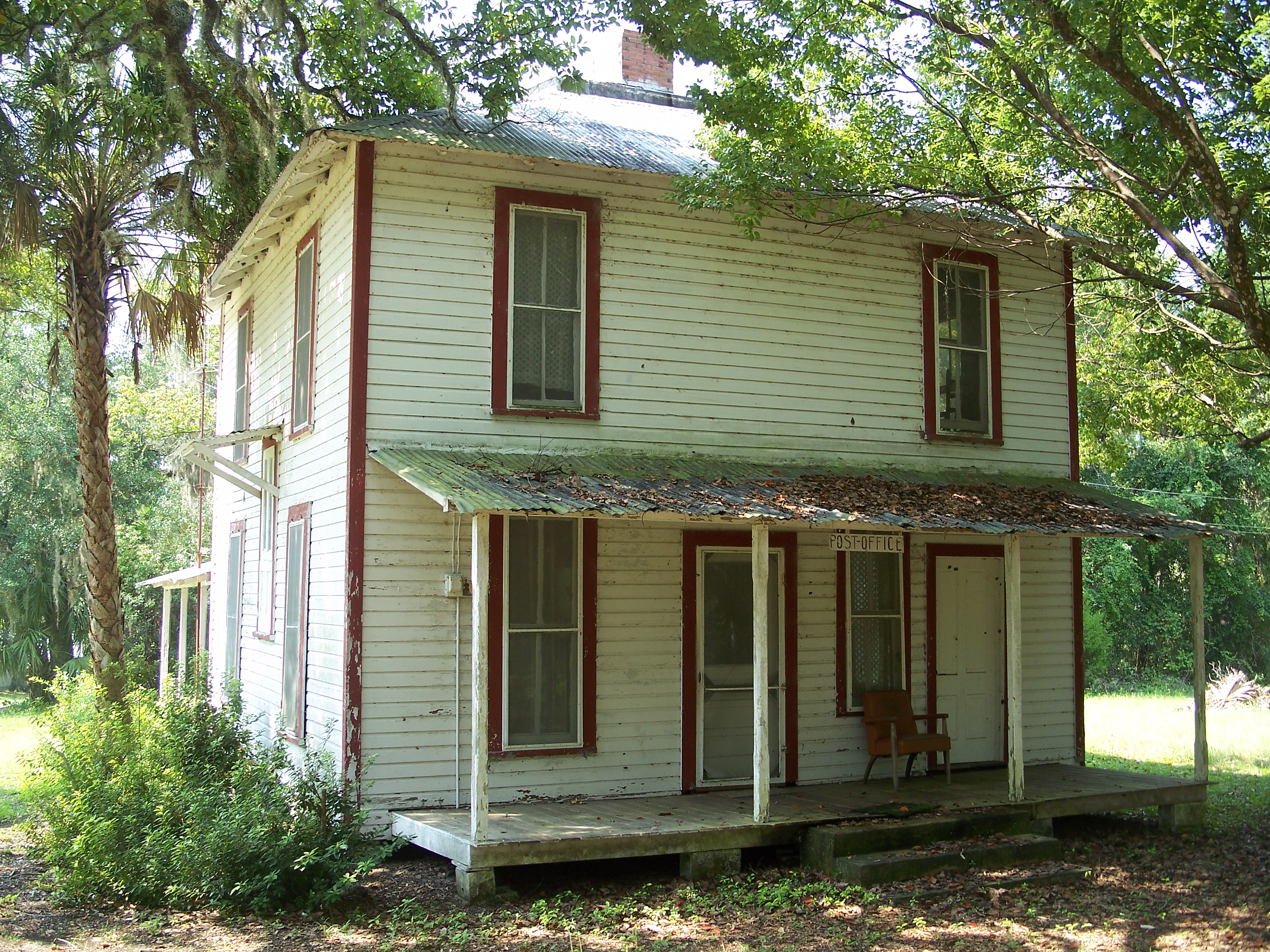
Former post office in the district

== See also ==
- National Register of Historic Places listings in Marion County, Florida
