= Tuscawilla Park Historic District =

Historic district in Florida, United States

- U.S. National Register of Historic Places
- U.S. Historic district
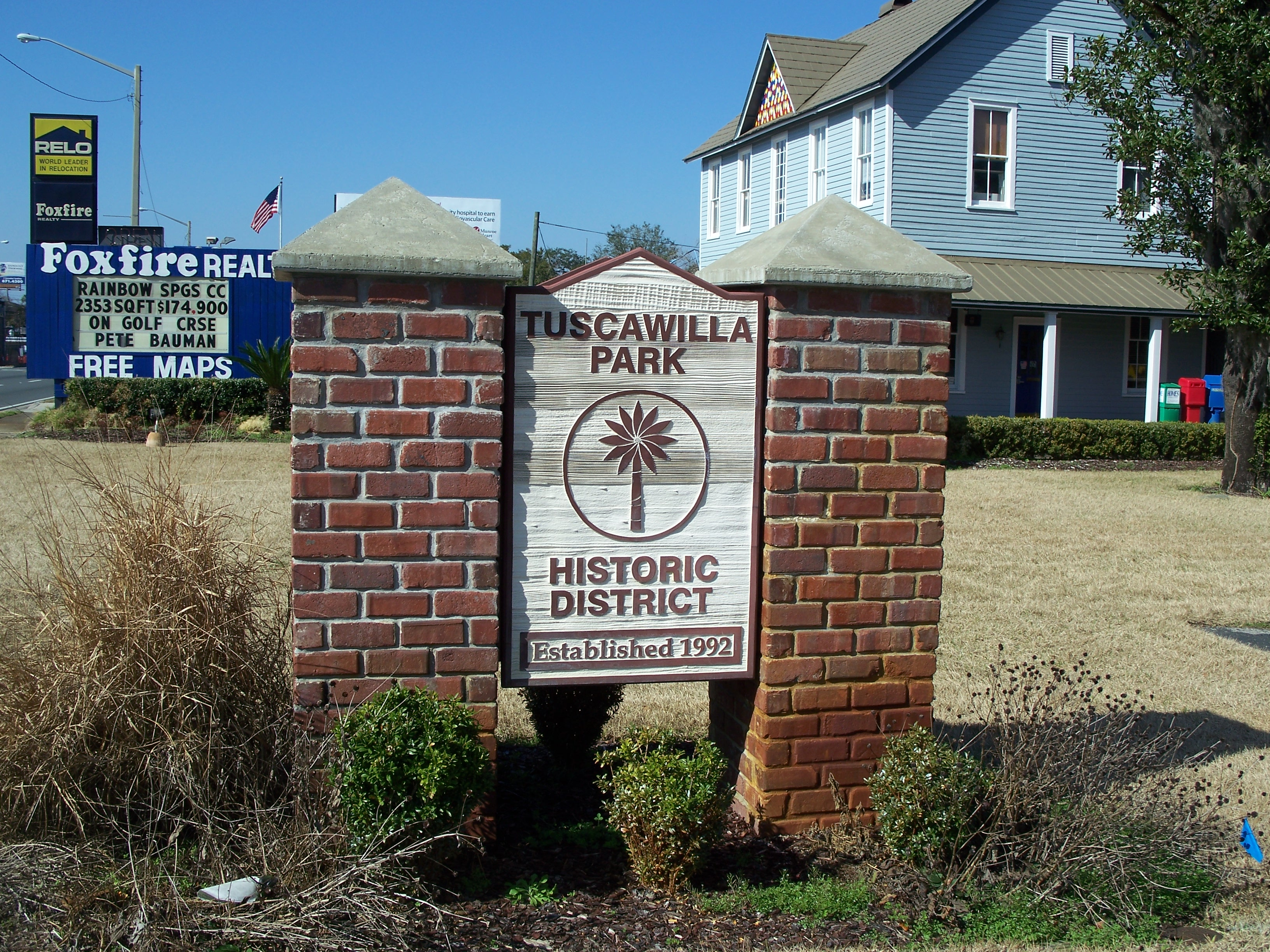

- Location within Florida Location within the United States
- Location: Ocala, Florida United States
- Coordinates: 29°11′21″N 82°7′57″W
- Area: 20 acres (81,000 m^{2})
- Built: 1877-1930
- NRHP reference No.: 87002015
- Added to NRHP: March 30, 1988

The Tuscawilla Park Historic District is a historic district in Ocala, Florida. It is bounded by Northeast 4th Street, Sanchez Avenue, 2nd Street, Tuscawilla Avenue, and Watula Street. It encompasses approximately 20 acres, and contains 37 historic buildings. On March 30, 1988, it was added to the National Register of Historic Places.

== See also ==
- United Hebrews of Ocala, a Carpenter Gothic structure built in 1888 at 729 N.E. 2nd street.
