= Morgan-Townsend House =

- U.S. National Register of Historic Places
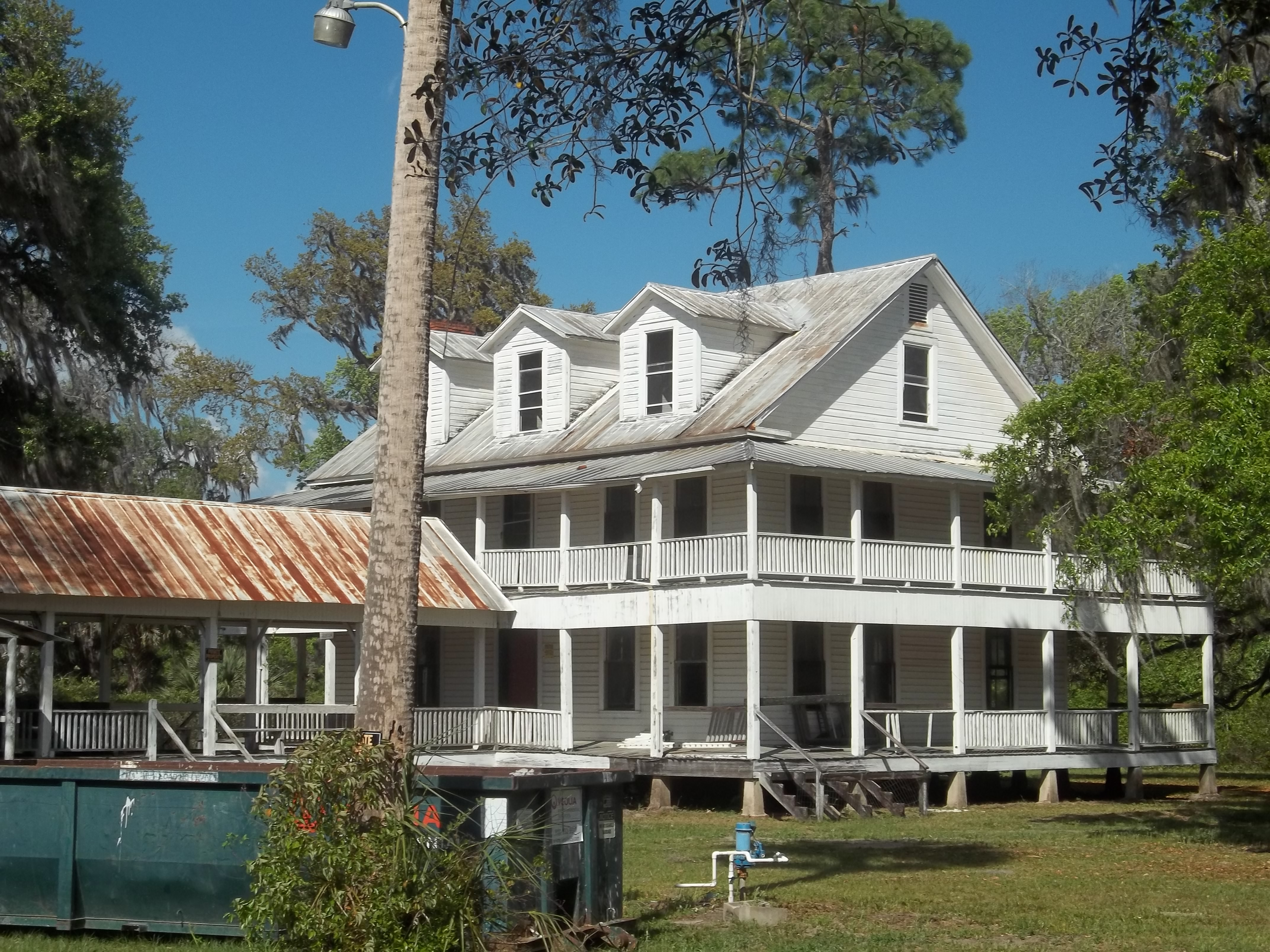

- Location within Florida Location within the United States
- Location: Salt Springs, Florida
- Coordinates: 29°21′00″N 81°44′03″W
- NRHP reference No.: 13000794
- Added to NRHP: September 26, 2013

Morgan-Townsend House is a national historic site located at 13535 North Highway 19, Salt Springs, Florida in Marion County. The rectangular two and one-half story house is an example of Frame Vernacular construction from the late nineteenth century.

It was added to the National Register of Historic Places on September 26, 2013.
