= James Riley Josselyn House =

Historic house in Florida, United States

- U.S. National Register of Historic Places
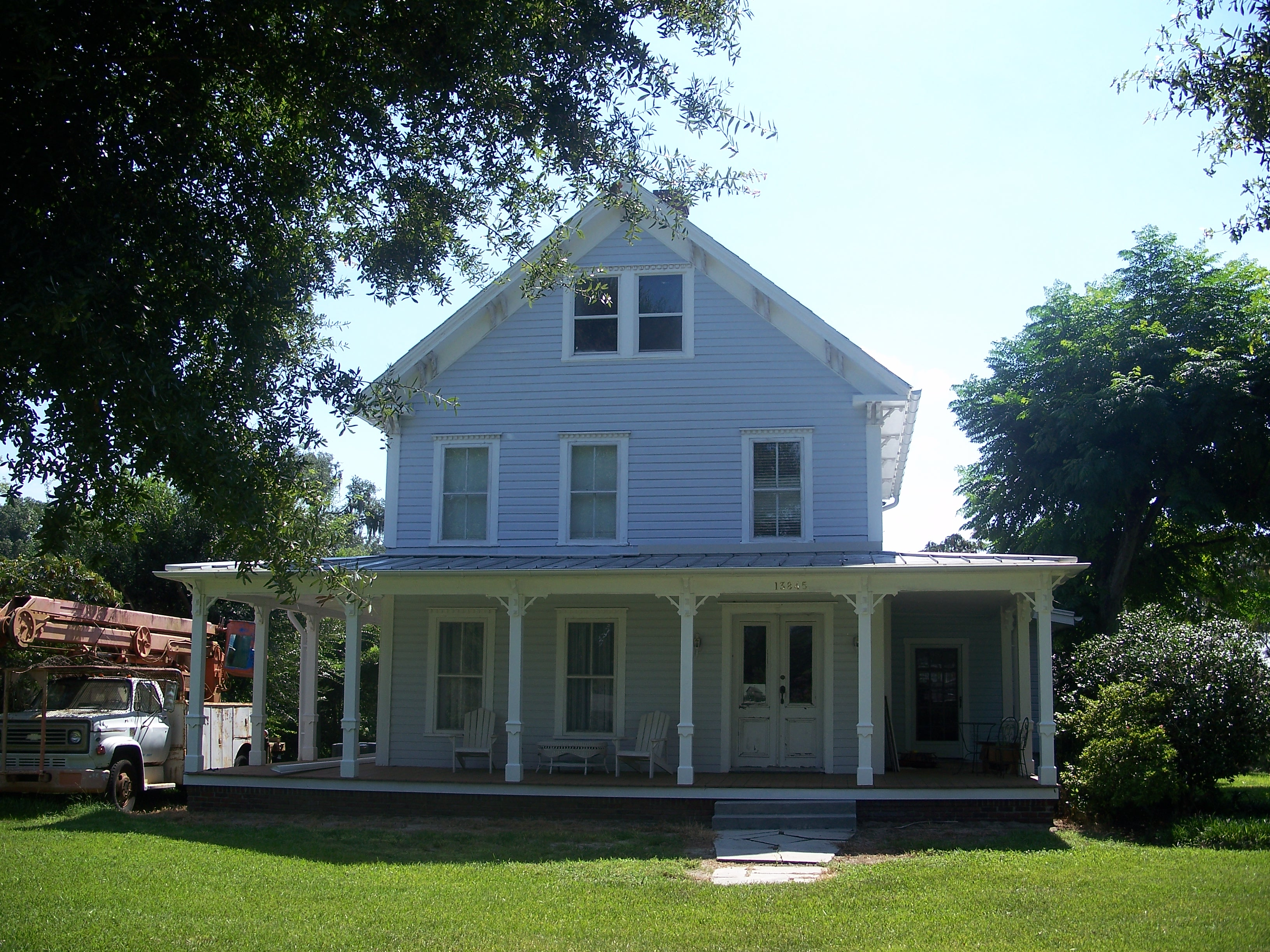

- Location within Florida Location within the United States
- Location: Eastlake Weir, Marion County
- Nearest city: Ocala
- Coordinates: 29°1′20″N 81°54′30″W
- Built: 1895
- MPS: Early Residences of Rural Marion County MPS
- NRHP reference No.: 93000591
- Added to NRHP: July 13, 1993

The James Riley Josselyn House is a historic home in Eastlake Weir, Florida, United States. It is located at 13845 Alternate US 27. On July 13, 1993, it was added to the U.S. National Register of Historic Places.
