= Lake Lillian Neighborhood Historic District =

Historic district in Florida, United States

- U.S. National Register of Historic Places
- U.S. Historic district
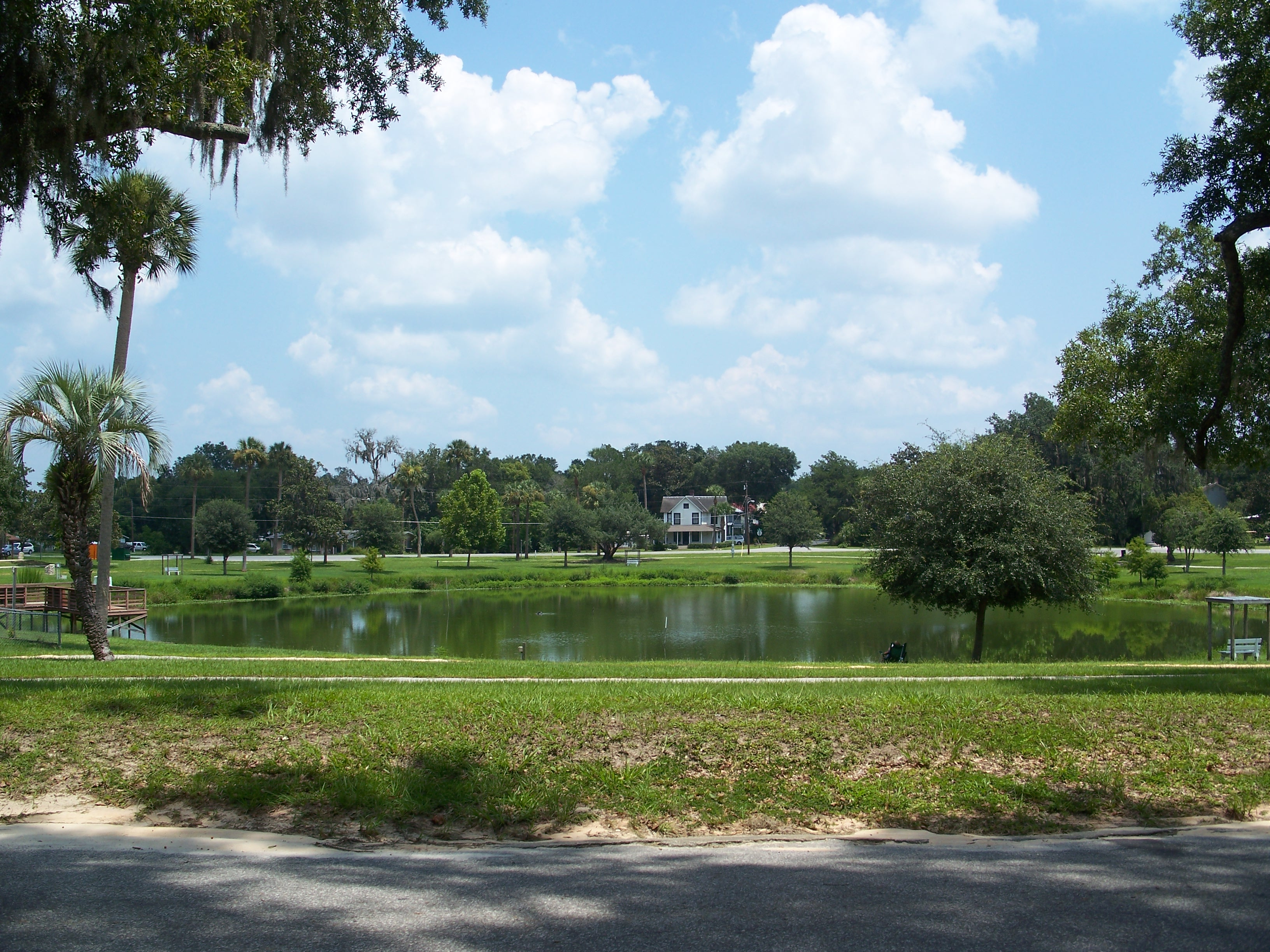
- View of Lake Lillian, the center of the district

- Location within Florida Location within the United States
- Location: Belleview, Marion County, U.S.
- Coordinates: 29°3′44″N 82°3′10″W
- Area: 30 acres (120,000 m^{2})
- NRHP reference No.: 99001012
- Added to NRHP: August 20, 1999

The Lake Lillian Neighborhood Historic District is a historic neighborhood located in Belleview, Florida. The district is bounded by Lillian Circle, Southeast Stetson Road, Southeast Mimosa Road, Southeast Earp Road and CSX RR tracks. It covers 300 acres (1.2 km^{2}), and contains 44 buildings. On August 20, 1999, it was added to the National Register of Historic Places.
