= E. C. Smith House =

Historic house in Florida, United States

- U.S. National Register of Historic Places
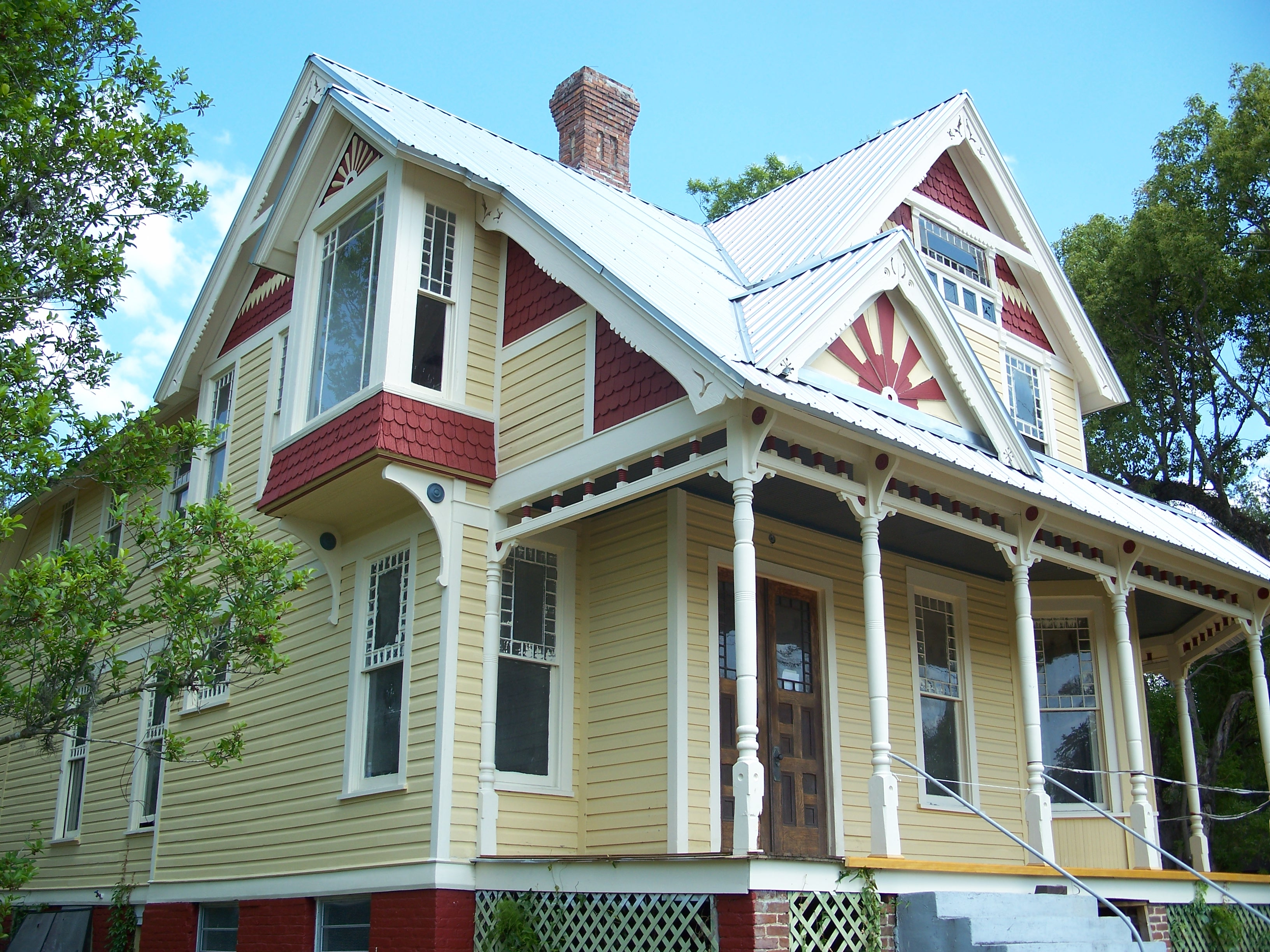

- Location within Florida Location within the United States
- Location: Ocala, Florida
- Coordinates: 29°11′32″N 82°7′47″W
- Architectural style: Queen Anne
- NRHP reference No.: 90000806
- Added to NRHP: May 24, 1990

The E. C. Smith House (also known as the James Hall House) is a historic home in Ocala, Florida. It is located at 507 Northeast 8th Avenue. On May 24, 1990, it was added to the U.S. National Register of Historic Places.
