= The Ritz Apartment (Ocala, Florida) =

- U.S. National Register of Historic Places
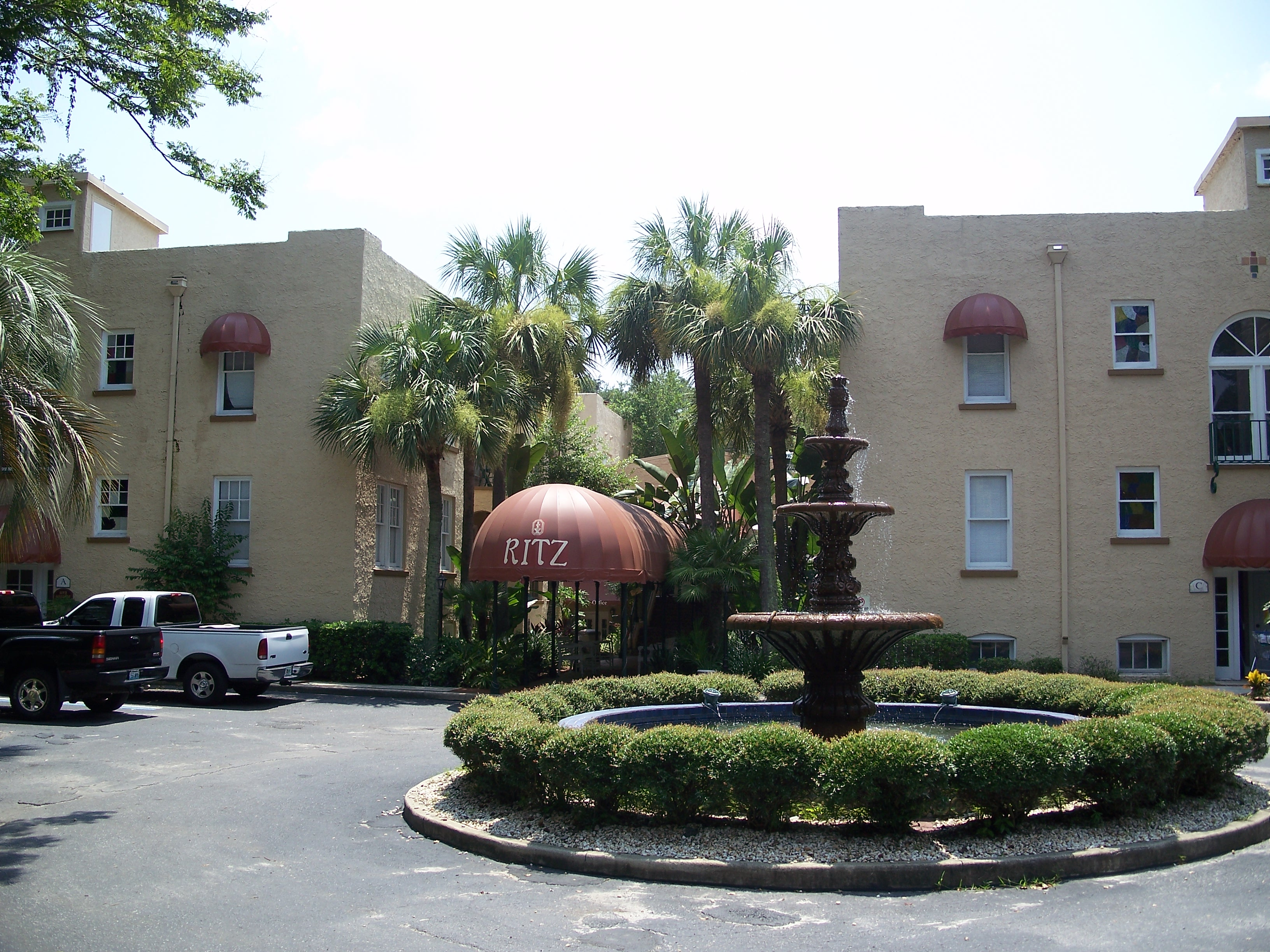
- Entrance to the Ritz Historic Inn (formerly the Ritz Apartment)

- Location within Florida Location within the United States
- Location: Ocala, Florida United States
- Coordinates: 29°11′13″N 82°7′5″W
- Built: 1925
- Architectural style: Mission/Spanish Colonial Revival Style architecture
- NRHP reference No.: 86001722
- Added to NRHP: August 21, 1986

The Ritz Apartment (also known as The Ritz-Ocala Apartments or The Acker-Ritz Apartments) is a historic building in Ocala, Florida, at 1205 East Silver Springs Boulevard, on the northeast corner of the intersection with Northeast 12th Avenue. On August 21, 1986, it was added to the U.S. National Register of Historic Places.
