= Alfred Ayer House =

Historic house in Florida, United States

- U.S. National Register of Historic Places
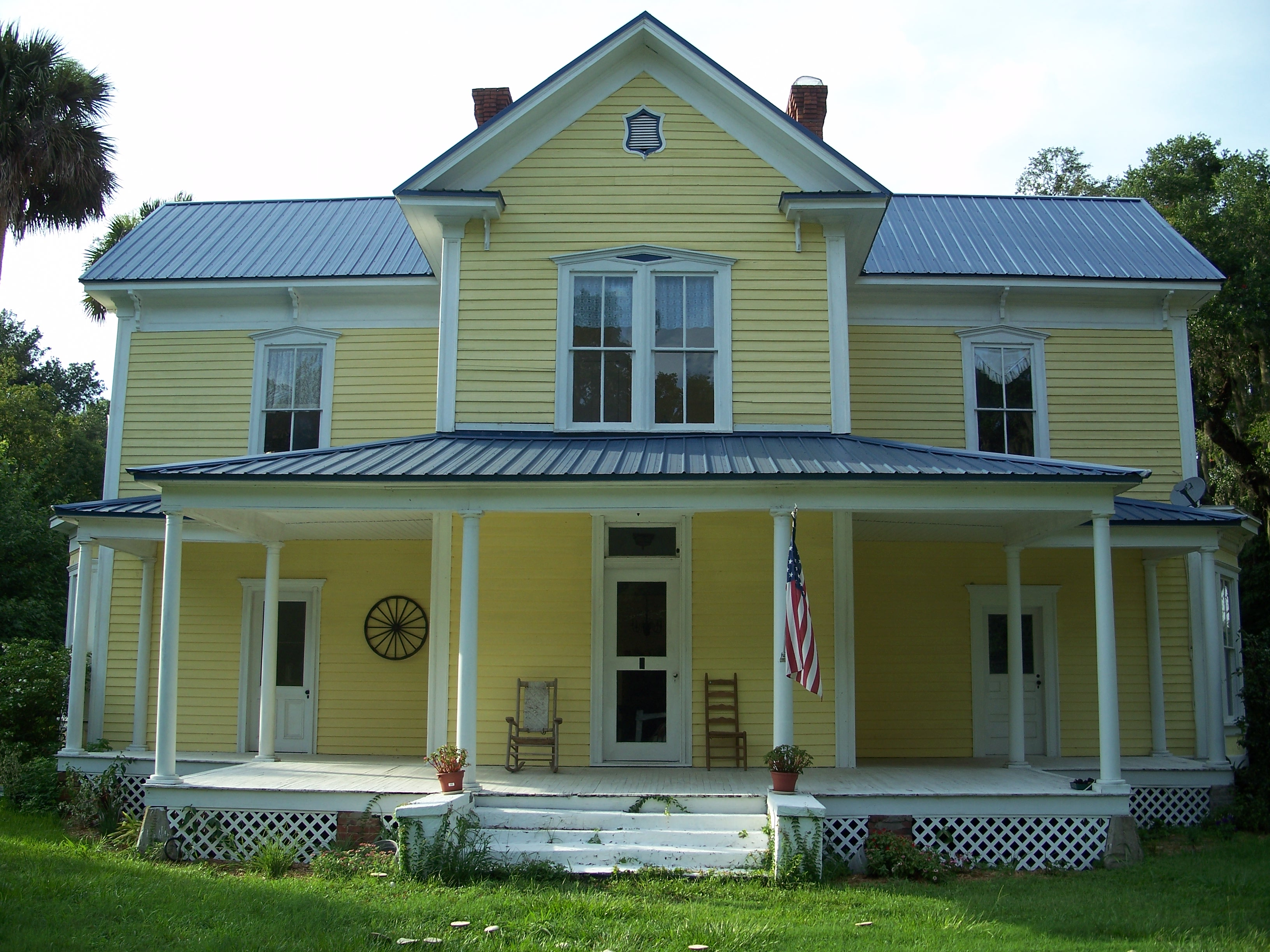

- Location within Florida
- Location: Oklawaha, Florida
- Coordinates: 29°2′21″N 81°57′0″W
- Built: circa 1885
- Architectural style: Frame Vernacular with Classical Revival elements
- MPS: Early Residences of Rural Marion County MPS
- NRHP reference No.: 93000590
- Added to NRHP: July 13, 1993

The Alfred Ayer House (also known as the James Eagleton House) is a historic house located on US Alternate 27, west of Oklawaha, Florida.

== Description and history ==
It was added to the National Register of Historic Places on July 13, 1993.
