= T. W. Randall House =

Historic house in Florida, United States

- U.S. National Register of Historic Places
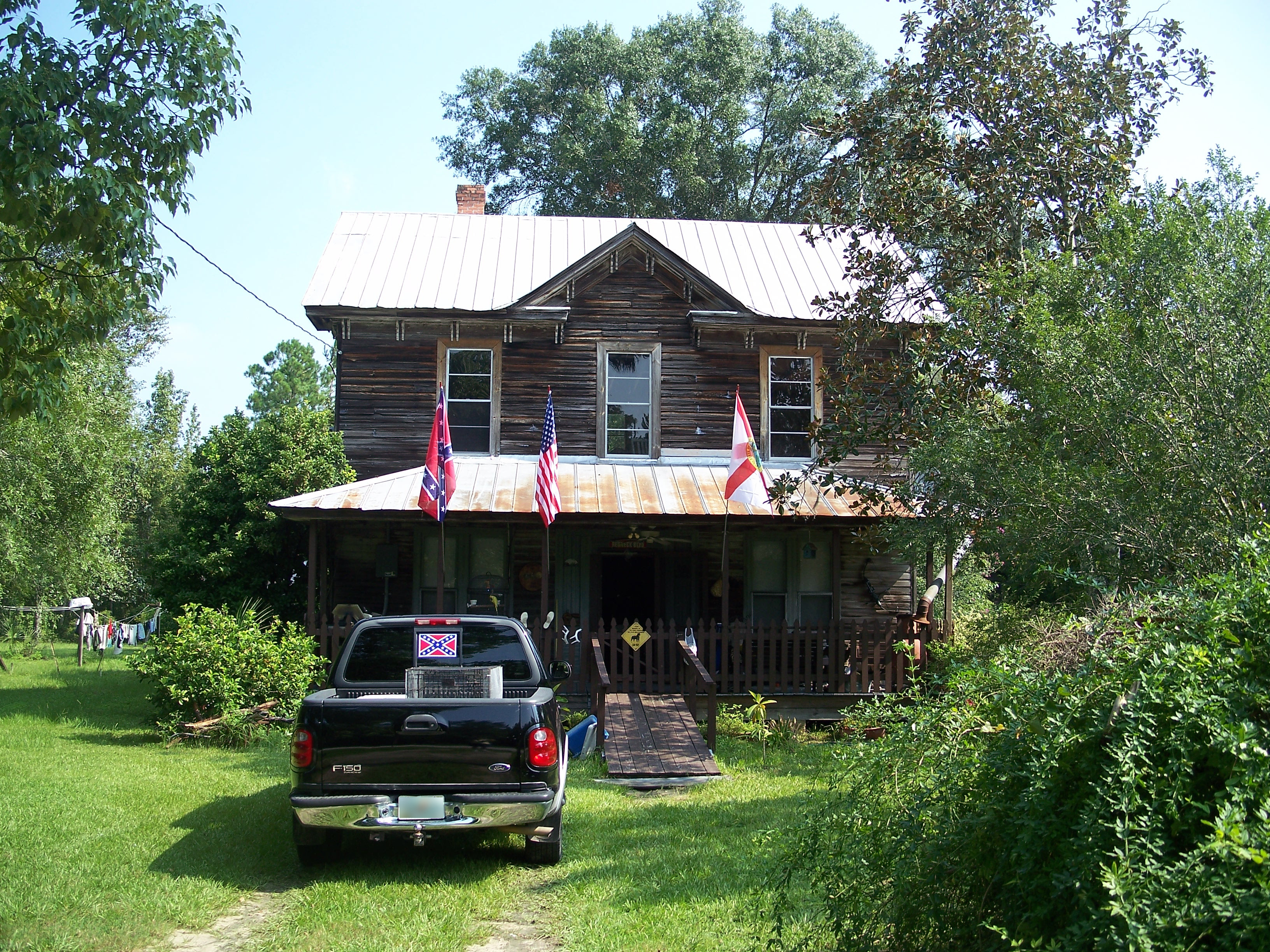

- Location within Florida Location within the United States
- Location: Marion County, Florida United States
- Nearest city: Silver Springs
- Coordinates: 29°13′57″N 81°57′39″W
- Built: 1887
- Architect: John W. Randall
- Architectural style: Frame Vernacular, Folk Victorian
- MPS: Early Residences of Rural Marion County MPS
- NRHP reference No.: 95000289
- Added to NRHP: April 6, 1995

The T. W. Randall House (also known as the Randall-Freeman-Leslie House) is an historic house located at 11685 Northeast State Road 314 in Silver Springs, Florida. It was added to the National Register of Historic Places on April 6, 1995.
