= Albert Ayer House =

Historic house in the United States

- U.S. National Register of Historic Places
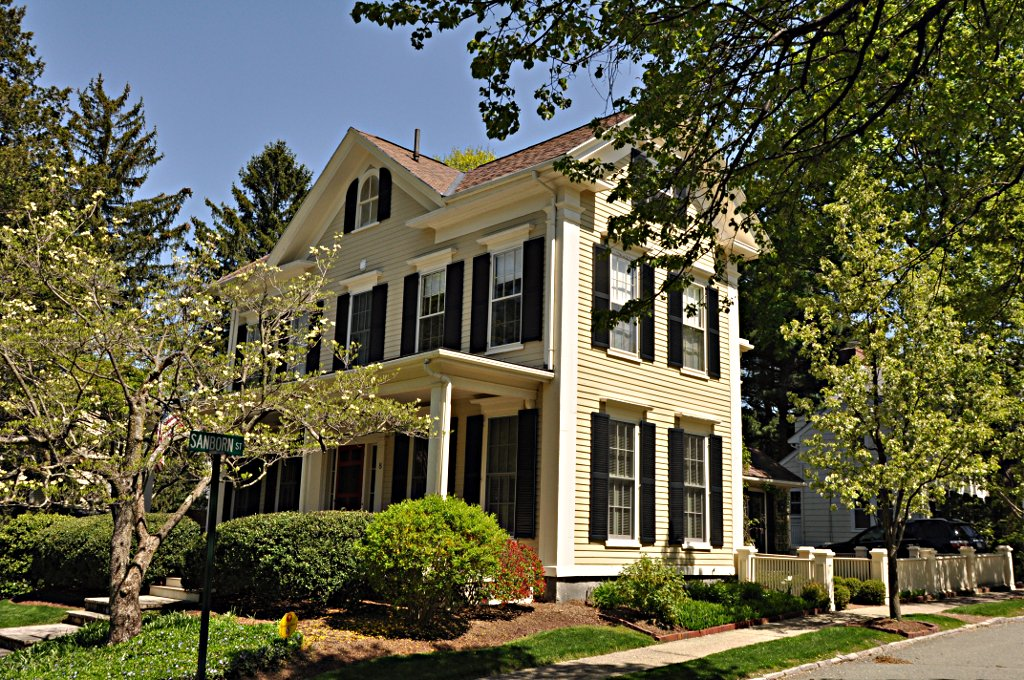

- Location within Massachusetts Location within the United States
- Location: 8 Brooks St., Winchester, Massachusetts
- Coordinates: 42°26′31″N 71°8′15″W
- Area: less than one acre
- Built: 1865
- Architectural style: Italianate
- MPS: Winchester MRA
- NRHP reference No.: 89000635
- Added to NRHP: July 5, 1989

The Albert Ayer House is a historic house in Winchester, Massachusetts. Built around the year 1865, it is a conservative but detailed example of early Italianate architecture. It was built for a locally prominent civic leader. The house was listed on the National Register of Historic Places in 1989.

== Description and history ==
The Albert Ayer House stands in a residential area of southeastern Winchester, at the northeast corner of Brooks and Sanborn Streets. It is a 2 1/2-story wood-frame structure, with a gable roof and clapboarded exterior. It has wide corner boards, and its porch, which spans the main facade, has chamfered square posts. The roof has side gables, with a center gable over the front, in which is a round-arch window. The front facade is five bays wide, with elongated first-floor windows in the Greek Revival style. Windows on the front and side are topped by shallow projecting peaked lintels.

The house was built about 1865, a period in which Winchester was early in a transition from more agricultural to suburban residential use. It was first owned by Albert Ayer, a prominent local politician who served for many years in a variety of civic roles. For more than 30 years Ayer was the town assessor, and also served four terms on the board of selectmen, and eight years as town clerk. He lived here until 1888. His brother Thomas lived next door on Grove Street.

== See also ==
- National Register of Historic Places listings in Winchester, Massachusetts
