= Thomas Ayer House =

Historic house in Massachusetts, United States

- U.S. National Register of Historic Places
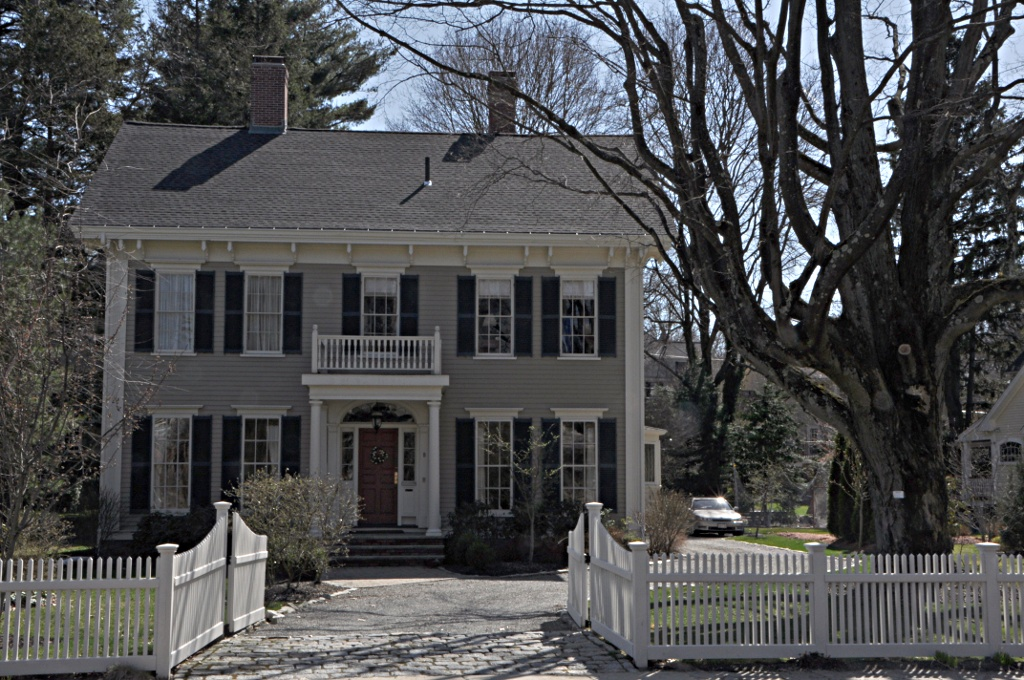

- Location within Massachusetts Location within the United States
- Location: 8 Grove St., Winchester, Massachusetts
- Coordinates: 42°26′31″N 71°8′15″W
- Area: less than one acre
- Built: 1854
- Architectural style: Italianate
- MPS: Winchester MRA
- NRHP reference No.: 89000630
- Added to NRHP: July 5, 1989

The Thomas Ayer House is a historic house at 8 Grove Street in Winchester, Massachusetts. Built about 1864, it is a conservative but detailed example of early Italianate architecture. It was built for a prominent local businessman and politician. The house was listed on the National Register of Historic Places in 1989.

== Description and history ==
The Thomas Ayer House stands in a residential area of southeastern Winchester, on the east side of Grove Street, a feeder road through the neighborhood. It is a 2 1/2-story wood-frame structure, with a side-gable roof, two interior chimneys, and a clapboarded exterior. It has pilastered corner boards, bracketed eaves, and tall windows with projecting sills and lintels. The main facade is five bays wide, with the entrance at the center, sheltered by a portico. The front portico has simple round columns supporting a roof with a low balcony, while the entry is flanked by sidelight windows and pilasters, and is topped by a fanlight window.

The house was built about 1864 by Thomas Ayer, a local businessman and politician. It was built at a time when Winchester was just beginning to undergo a transition from an agricultural to a residential suburban area. Ayer was prominent in civic affairs, raising funds and materials for the American Civil War effort, and serving on various town committees. He served for two years on the board of selectmen, and served one term in the state legislature. Ayer's brother Albert, also prominent in local affairs, lived in a house that was originally adjacent to this one on Brooks Street, but has since been separated from it by infill construction.

== See also ==
- National Register of Historic Places listings in Winchester, Massachusetts
