= Thomas R. Ayer House =

Historic house in Florida, United States

- U.S. National Register of Historic Places
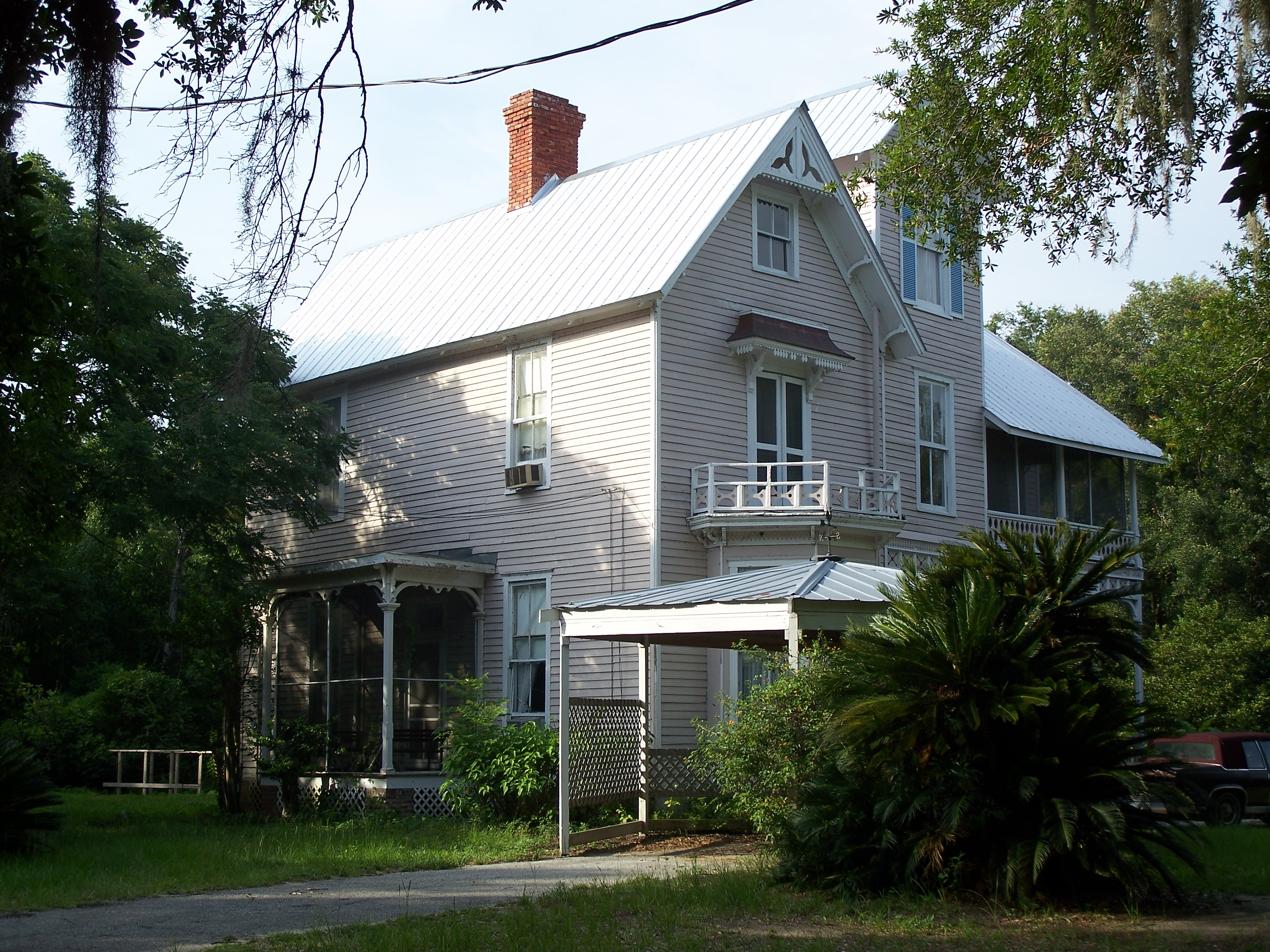

- Location within Florida
- Location: 11885 Southeast 128th Place, Oklawaha, Marion County
- Coordinates: 29°2′9″N 81°57′22″W
- Built: 1885
- Architectural style: Queen Anne
- MPS: Early Residences of Rural Marion County MPS
- NRHP reference No.: 93000588
- Added to NRHP: July 13, 1993

The Thomas R. Ayer House (also known as the Parr House) is a historic house located in Oklawaha, Florida. It is architecturally significant as the best example of the Queen Anne style in rural Marion County. It is also significant in that it is associated with Thomas Ayer, a citrus pioneer of Marion County.

== Description and history ==
The exterior finish of the house is horizontal, wooden weatherboard. The building has a variety of roof forms, most of which are gabled, with various degrees of pitch. Other types of roofs and roof features include a gable dormer, a flat roof, pent roof, and shed roofs. Both primary and secondary roof surfaces are covered by galvanized sheet metal in a V-crimp pattern. The roof is pierced by two brick, corbelled chimneys on the north and west sides of the building, and an exterior brick chimney is located on the east side of the rear addition.

At the time the house was built, the surrounding land was mostly orange groves and was sparsely populated. Although the property is named for Thomas Ayer, property records indicate the original owners of the house were actually L. J. and Lucy Parr, who bought the land from General Robert Bullock in 1885. By 1887, they had given the property and newly constructed house to Ayer.

It was added to the National Register of Historic Places on July 13, 1993.

== Gallery ==
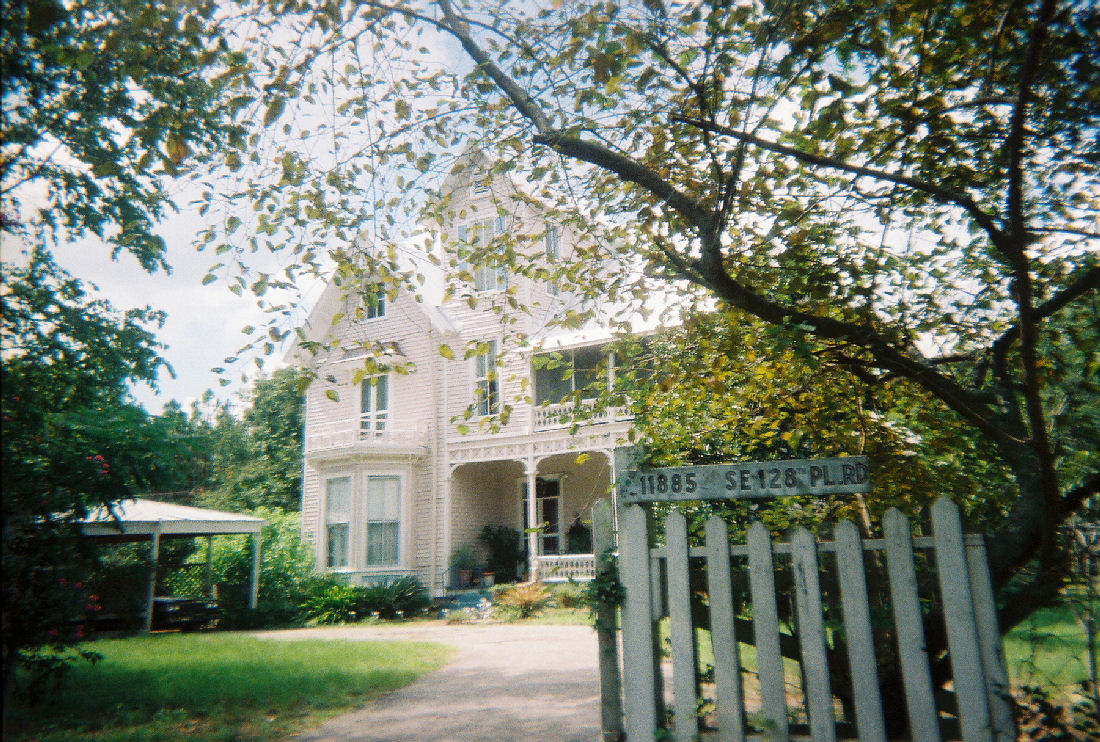
View with the address

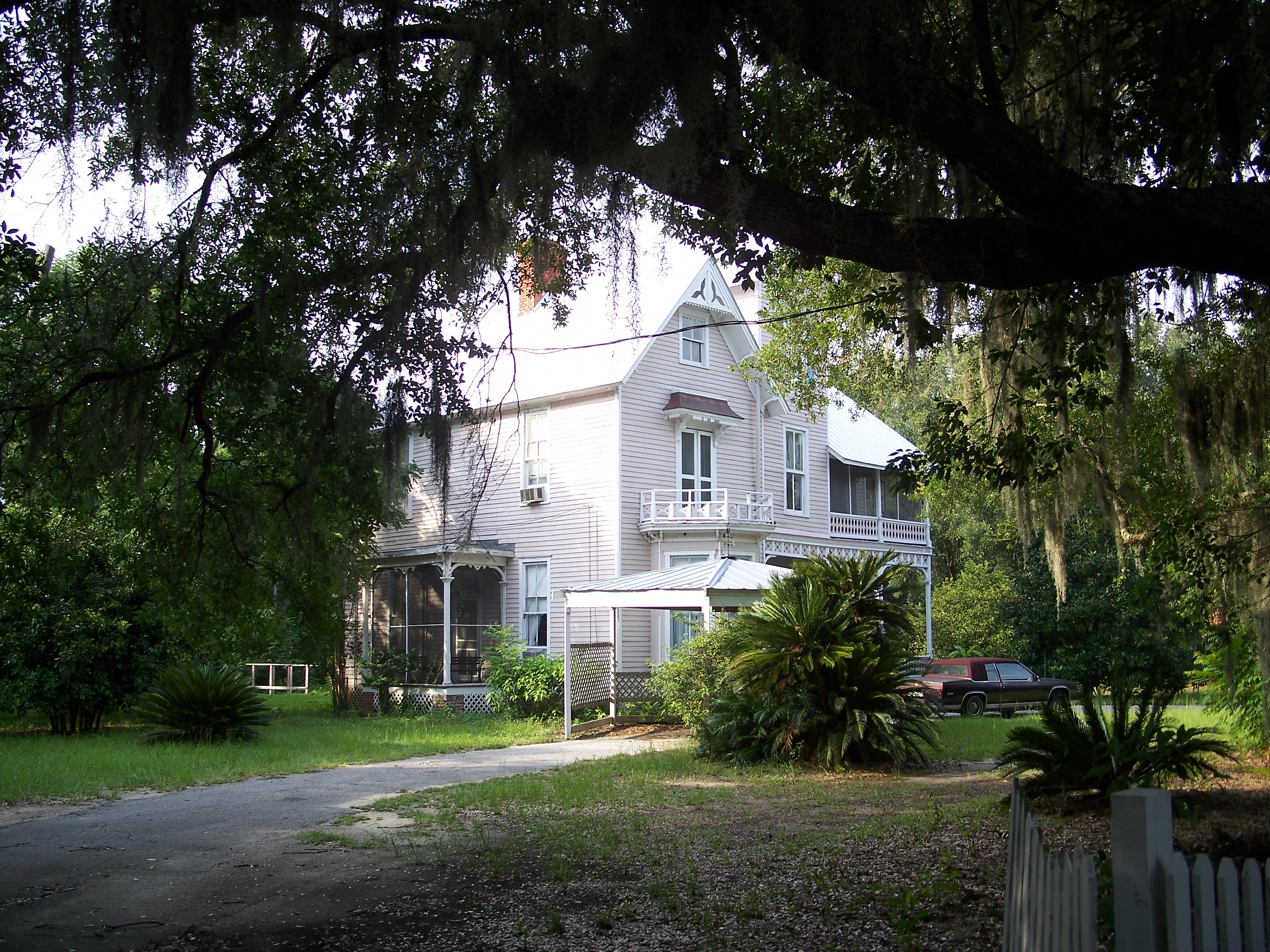

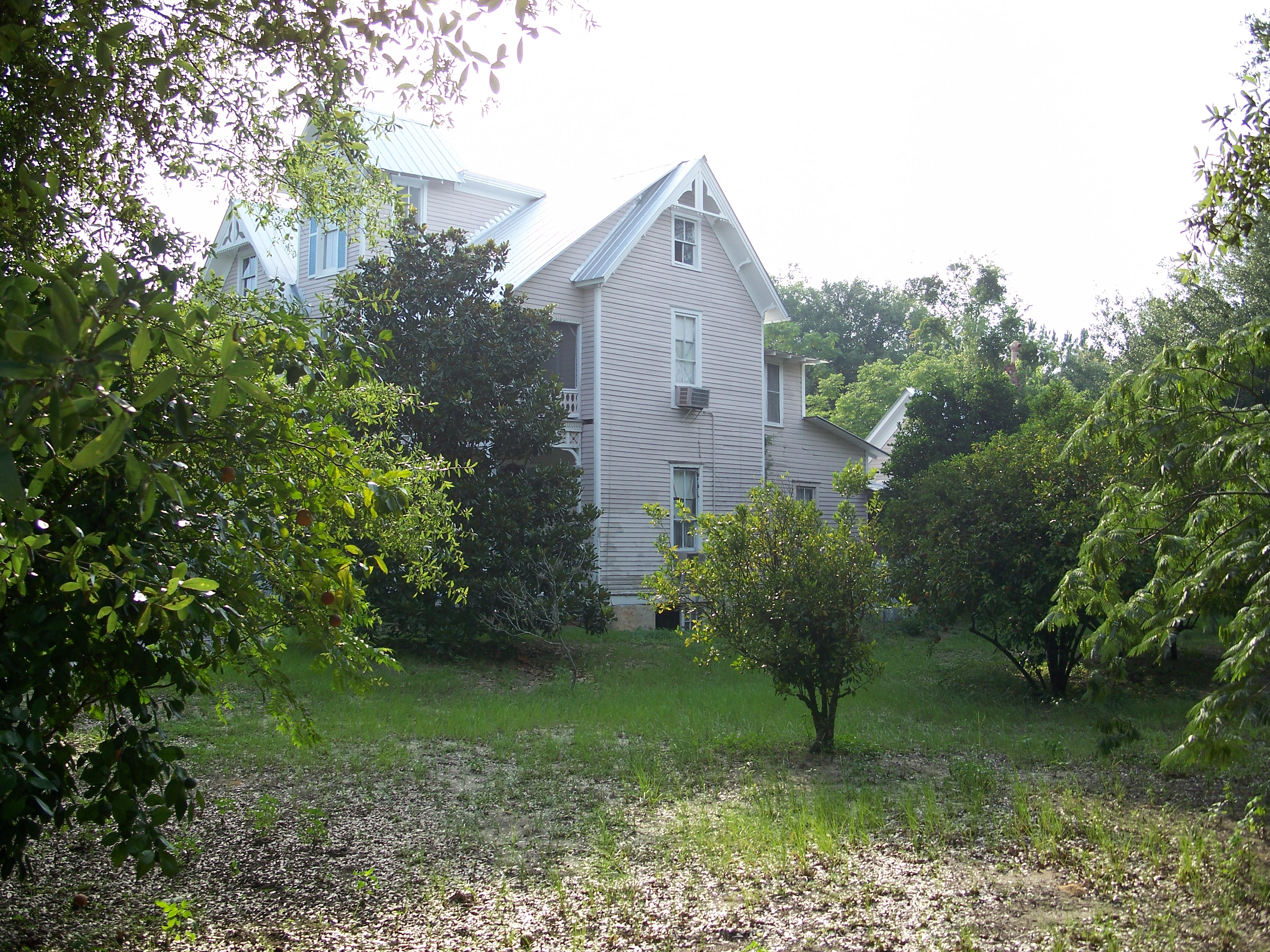

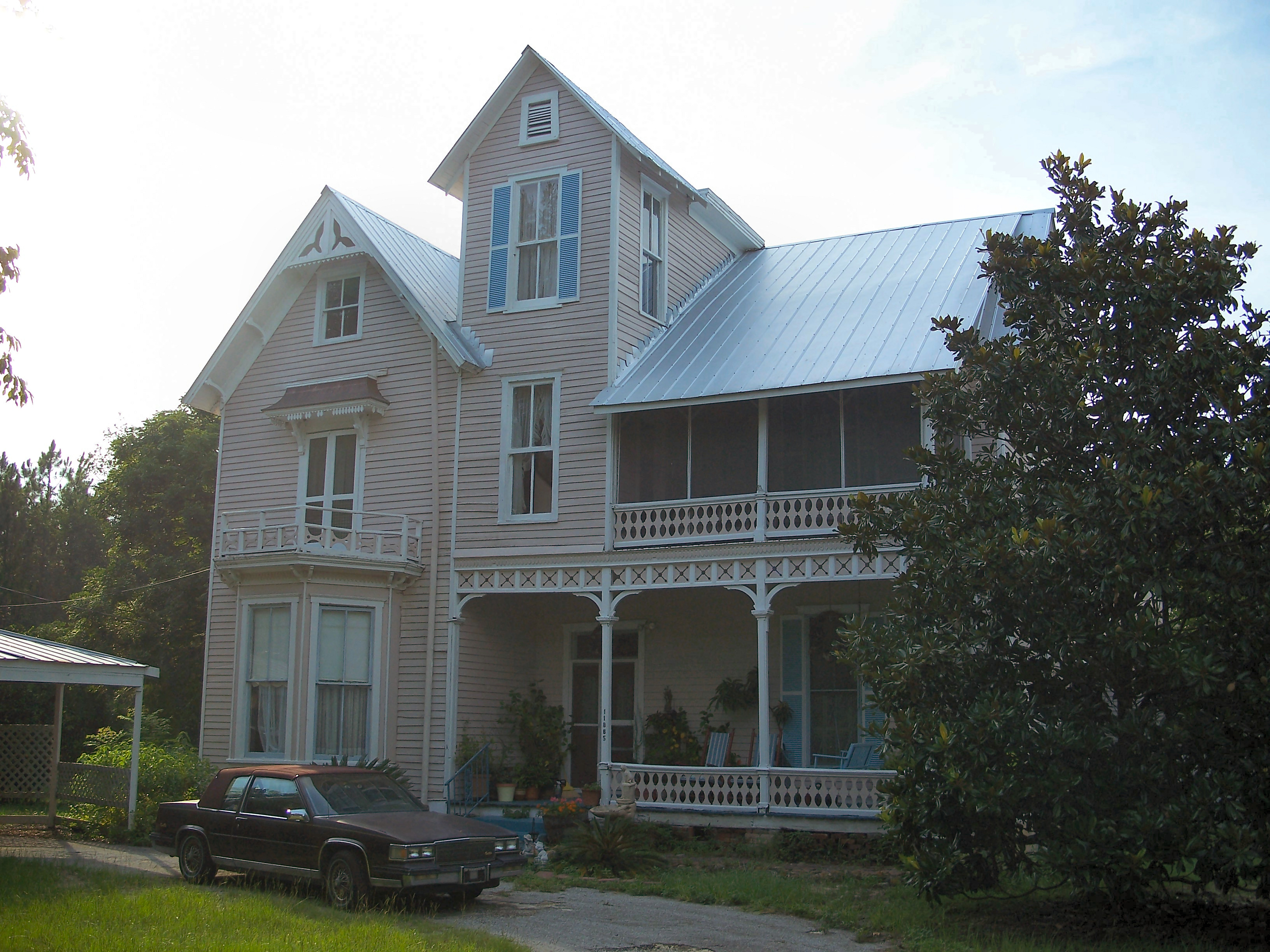
