= Ocala Historic Commercial District =

Historic district in Florida, United States

- U.S. National Register of Historic Places
- U.S. Historic district
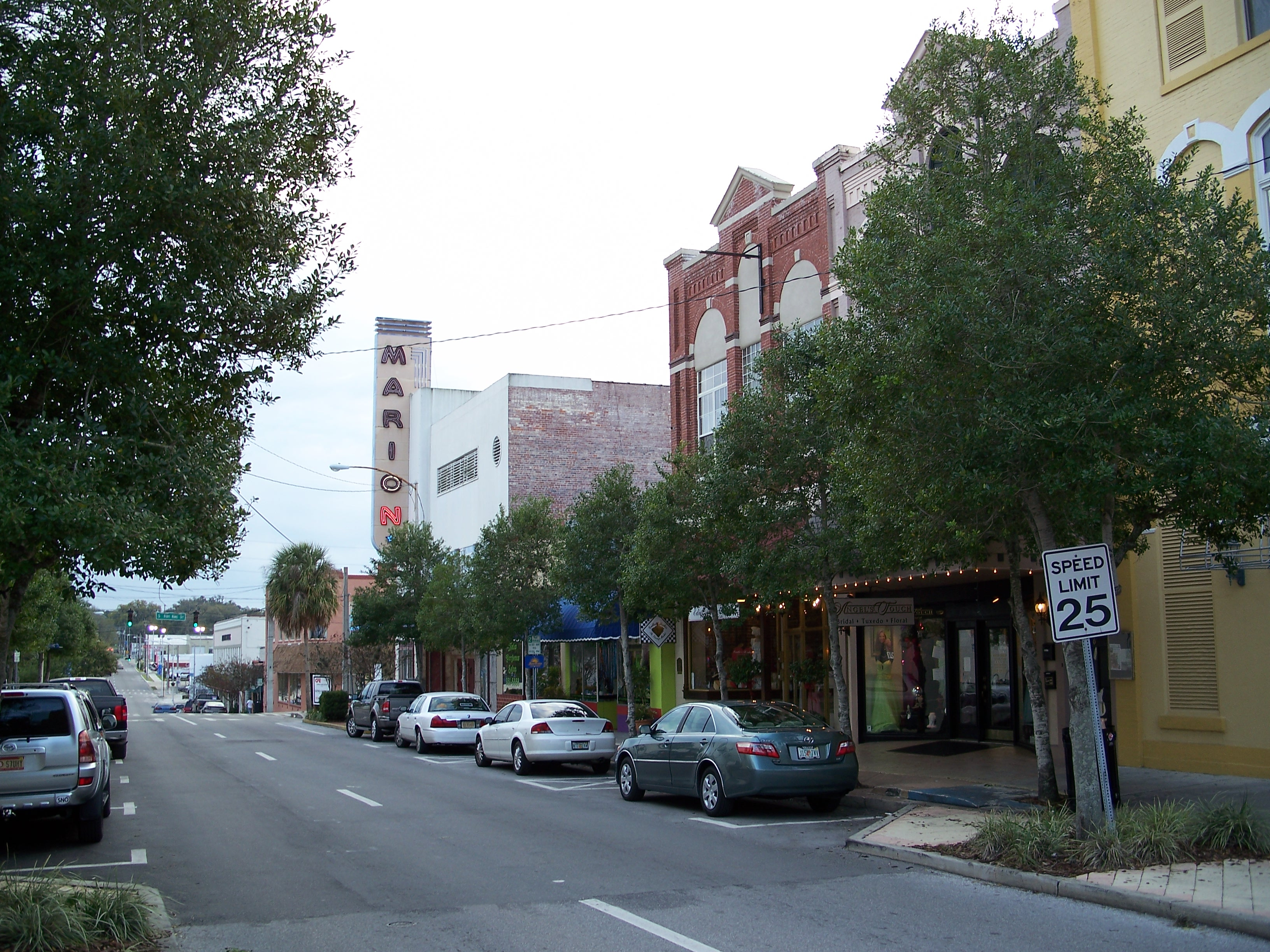
- View down Magnolia Avenue toward center of district

- Location within Florida Location within the United States
- Location: Ocala, Florida United States
- Coordinates: 29°11′8″N 82°8′12″W
- Area: 9 acres (36,000 m^{2})
- NRHP reference No.: 99000656
- Added to NRHP: June 3, 1999

The Ocala Historic Commercial District is a U.S. Historic District, designated on June 3, 1999, and located in Ocala, Florida. It encompasses approximately 90 acres (360,000 m^{2}) and is bounded by 1st Street Northwest, 1st Avenue Southeast, 2nd Street Southwest, and 1st Avenue Southwest. It encompasses approximately 90 acres (360,000 m²) and is bounded by 1st Street Northwest, 1st Avenue Southeast, 2nd Street Southwest, and 1st Avenue Southwest, containing 20 historic buildings.
