= Emathla, Florida =

Unincorporated community in Florida, U.S.

Emathla is an unincorporated community in northwestern Marion County, Florida, United States. It is located at the intersection of State Road 326 and County Road 225. Named for the Seminole chieftain this community is part of the Ocala Metropolitan Statistical Area.

== Geography ==
Emathla is located at 29°16′57″N 82°17′32″W.
