= Ocklawaha, Florida =

- Census-designated place
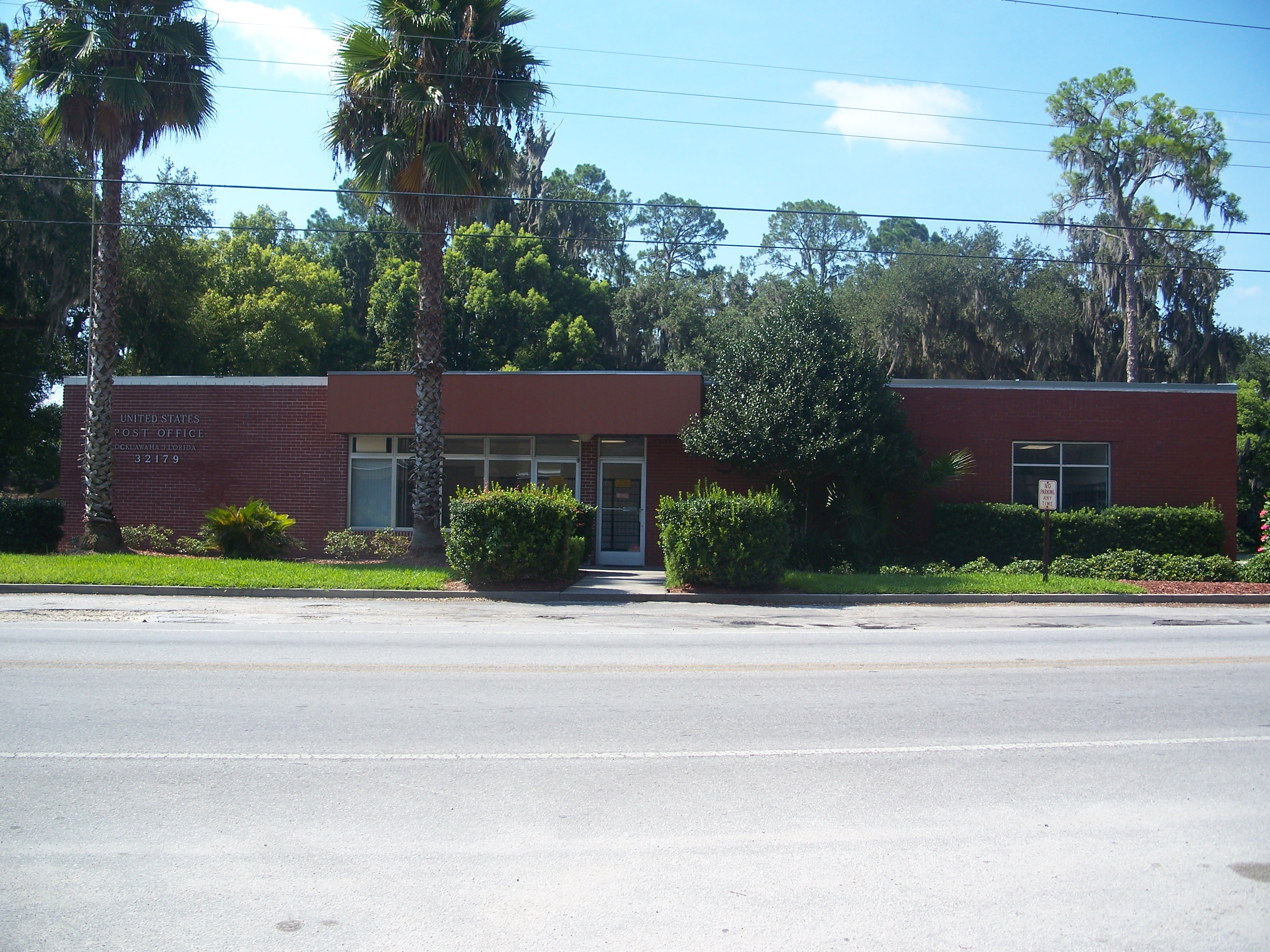
- Ocklawaha Post Office
- Interactive map of Ocklawaha, Florida
- Coordinates: 29°02′39″N 81°56′02″W

Area
  - Total: 3.39 sq mi (8.8 km^{2})
  - Land: 2.39 sq mi (6.2 km^{2})
  - Water: 1.00 sq mi (2.6 km^{2})
- Elevation: 69 ft (21 m)

Population (2020)
  - Total: 1,508
  - Density: 630.7/sq mi (243.5/km^{2})
- Time zone: UTC-5 (Eastern (EST))
  - Summer (DST): UTC-4 (EDT)
- ZIP Codes: 32179, 32183
- Area code: 352
- FIPS code: 12-51050
- GNIS feature ID: 2805183

Ocklawaha (also spelled Oklawaha) is an unincorporated community and census-designated place (CDP) in Marion County, Florida, United States. As of the 2020 census, the population was 1,508. The community is part of the Ocala Metropolitan Statistical Area.

== History ==
A post office was established at Ocklawaha in 1884. The area has its own postal district (32179) and post office. The community took its name from the nearby Ocklawaha River.

=== The Shootout ===
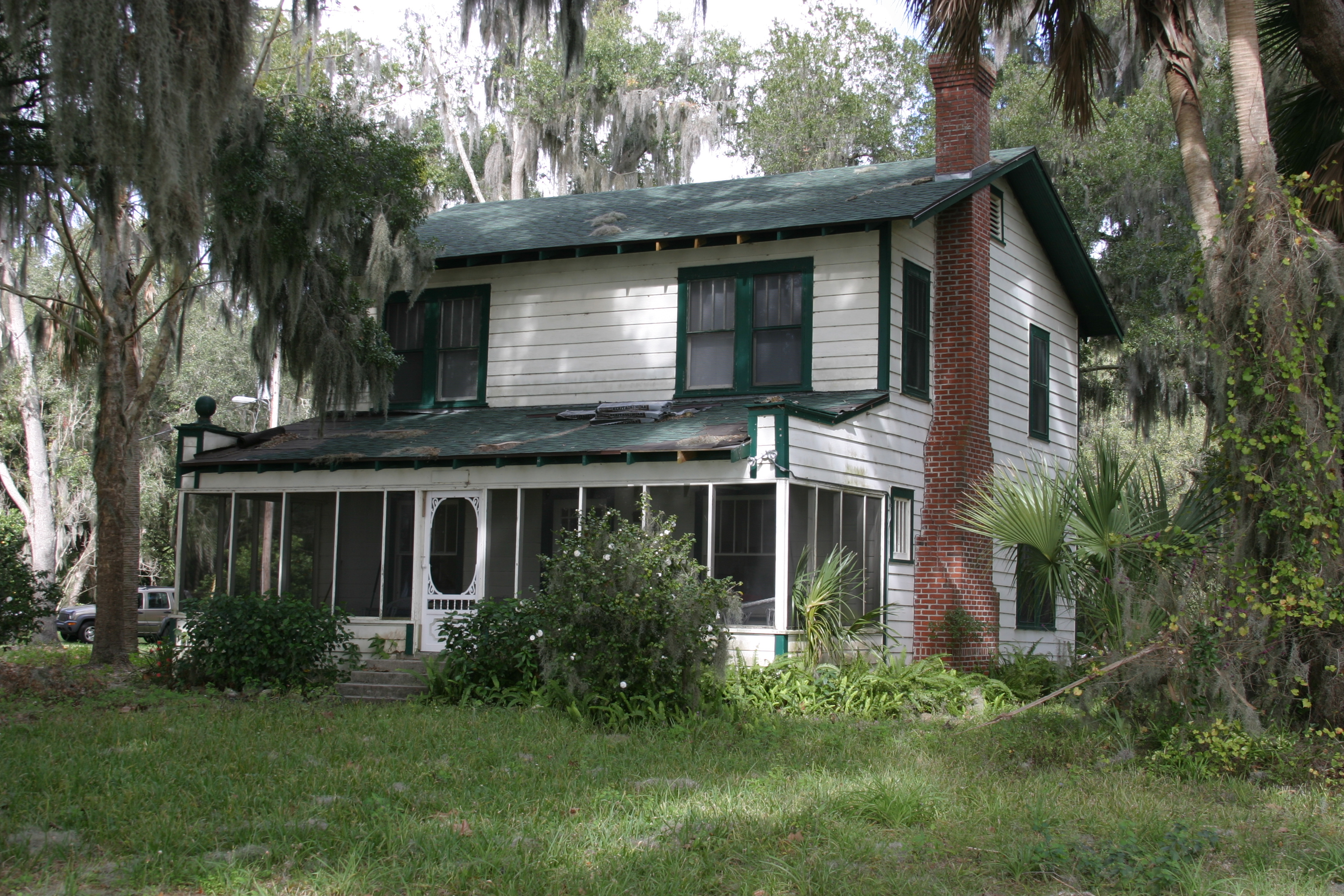
"Ma" and Fred Barker died in the upper left bedroom of this house beside Lake Weir in Florida

In 1935, Ocklawaha was the scene of a shootout between federal agents and Barker-Karpis Gang member Fred Barker. The agents fired about 500 bullets into the house, with roughly 250 shots fired in return, according to the after-action report of Special Agent in Charge Earl "E.J." Connelley. The fight ended in the deaths of Fred Barker and his mother Kate "Ma" Barker.

== Geography ==
Ocklawaha is located in southeastern Marion County on the north shore of Lake Weir. It is bordered to the east by Silver Springs Shores East. Ocala, the Marion county seat, is 18 miles (29 km) to the northwest, and Leesburg is the same distance to the south.

According to the U.S. Census Bureau, the Ocklawaha CDP has a total area of 3.4 square miles (8.8 km^{2}), of which 2.4 square miles (6.2 km^{2}) are land and 1.0 square mile (2.6 km^{2}), or 29.5%, are water. The water area is mainly in Lake Weir to the south, with the rest in Bowers Lake on the western edge of the community.

== Demographics ==
Ocklawaha first appeared as a census designated place in the 2020 U.S. census.

=== 2020 census ===
As of the 2020 census, Ocklawaha had a population of 1,508. The median age was 47.9 years. 18.2% of residents were under the age of 18 and 21.2% of residents were 65 years of age or older. For every 100 females there were 105.2 males, and for every 100 females age 18 and over there were 109.9 males age 18 and over.

89.1% of residents lived in urban areas, while 10.9% lived in rural areas.

There were 648 households in Ocklawaha, of which 23.9% had children under the age of 18 living in them. Of all households, 41.5% were married-couple households, 20.2% were households with a male householder and no spouse or partner present, and 25.0% were households with a female householder and no spouse or partner present. About 26.4% of all households were made up of individuals and 13.1% had someone living alone who was 65 years of age or older.

There were 838 housing units, of which 22.7% were vacant. The homeowner vacancy rate was 3.3% and the rental vacancy rate was 14.8%.

Racial composition as of the 2020 census
Race	Number	Percent
White	1,244	82.5%
Black or African American	96	6.4%
American Indian and Alaska Native	9	0.6%
Asian	12	0.8%
Native Hawaiian and Other Pacific Islander	1	0.1%
Some other race	29	1.9%
Two or more races	117	7.8%
Hispanic or Latino (of any race)	122	8.1%

== See also ==
Ocklawaha book
