= Silver River Museum =

Nature museum in Silver Springs, Florida

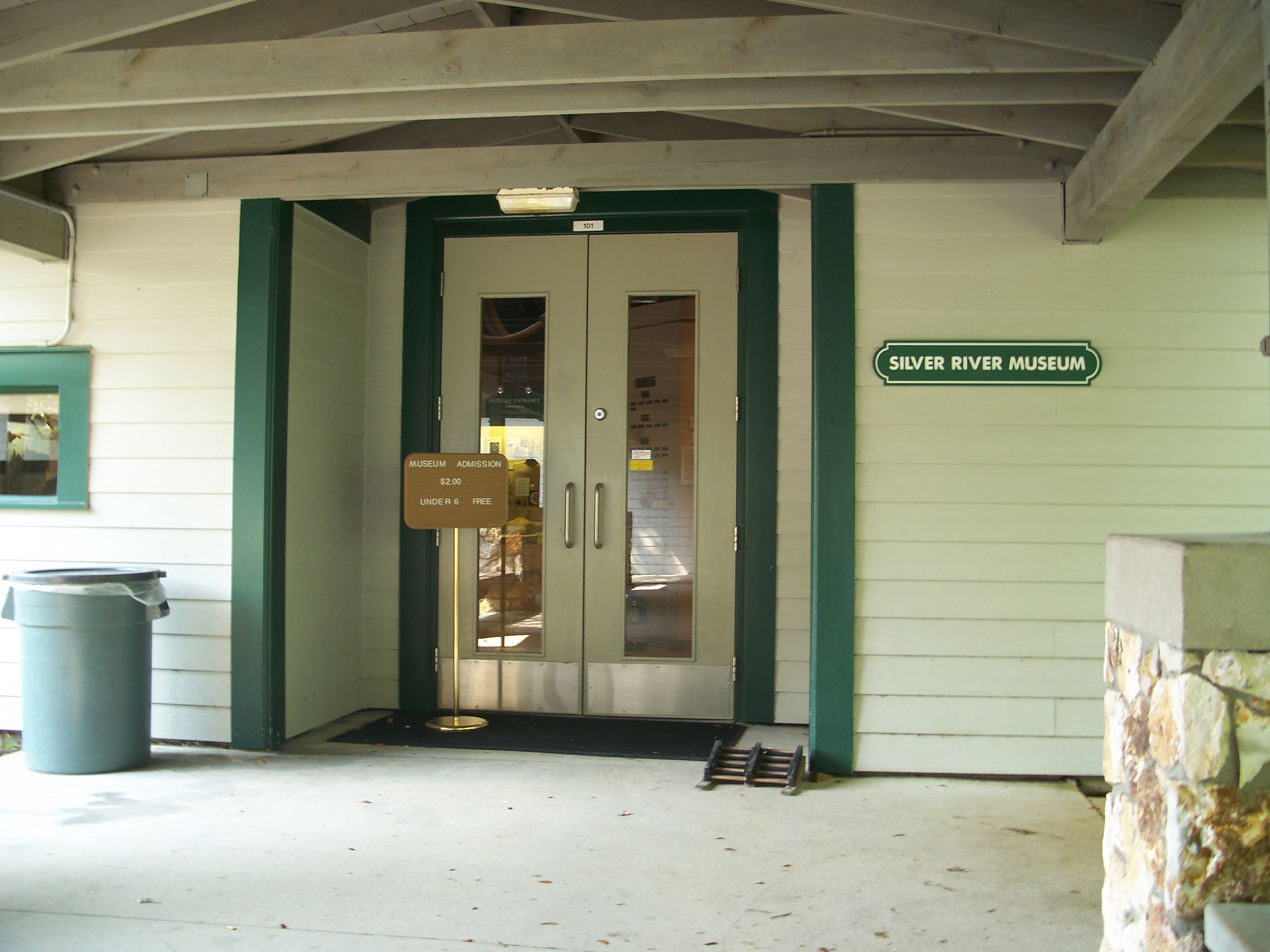
- Museum entrance

- Location within Florida
- Established: 1991
- Location: Silver Springs, Florida
- Coordinates: 29.202088°N 82.034676°W
- Website: www.silverrivermuseum.com

The Silver River Museum and Environmental Education Center is a nature museum in Silver Springs State Park in Silver Springs, Florida, near Ocala. The museum is named after the Silver River, which flows through the park.

Marion County Public Schools operates the museum and center in cooperation with the Florida Park Service, with both hosting educational events. The concept of the center dates back to 1987, and initial funding was provided through a Christa McAullife Fellowship. In 1991, the museum and center opened to provide daily classes for the students of Marion County.

== Facilities ==
The initial facilities consisted of the museum itself, together with classroom buildings. More recent additions include a new wing to the museum, a lunch pavilion, a research library, a Florida cracker pioneer settlement of the late 1800s, and a one-room schoolhouse used by African-American students during racial segregation (c1930).

The Center's 19th-century farm buildings (houses, meeting house/school, sheds, blacksmith, etc.) and museum of the natural and social history of the area are used during the week by the school district for classes, but are open to the public on the weekends.

== Ocali Country Days ==
For one week, early in November, the Center and Park put on the Ocali Country Days as a fund raiser. This is a 19th-century, living history event with displays, talks, and performances incorporating living historians. For that Tuesday through Friday it is open to public, private and home school-age children and their teachers who have made reservations with the Center. In 2008, attendance was limited to 1,200 students and teachers per day and this quota was filled every day. So make your reservations early.

The event is open to the general public on Saturday and Sunday and has become a popular annual attraction in the area.
