= Paradise Park, Florida =

Segregated tourist atrtraction in Florida

Coordinates: 29.2118°N 82.0575°W

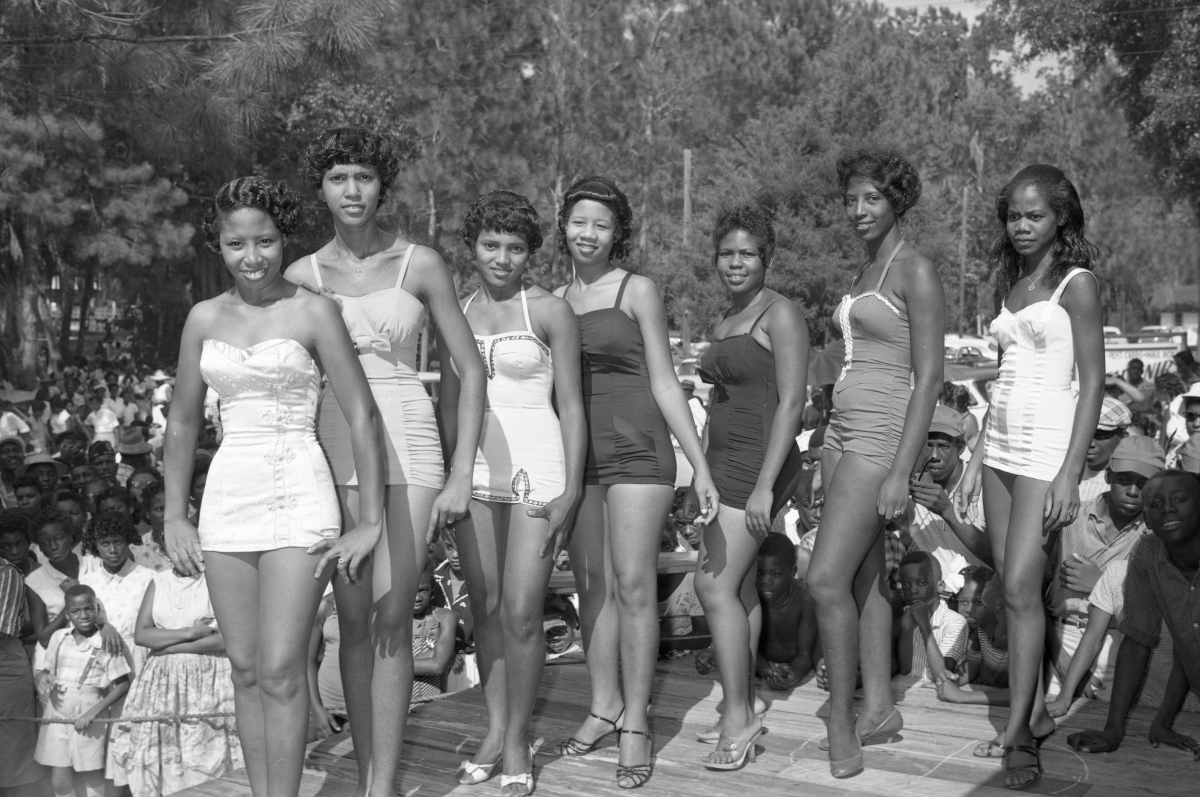
Finalists on stage in the 9th Annual Miss Paradise Park pageant

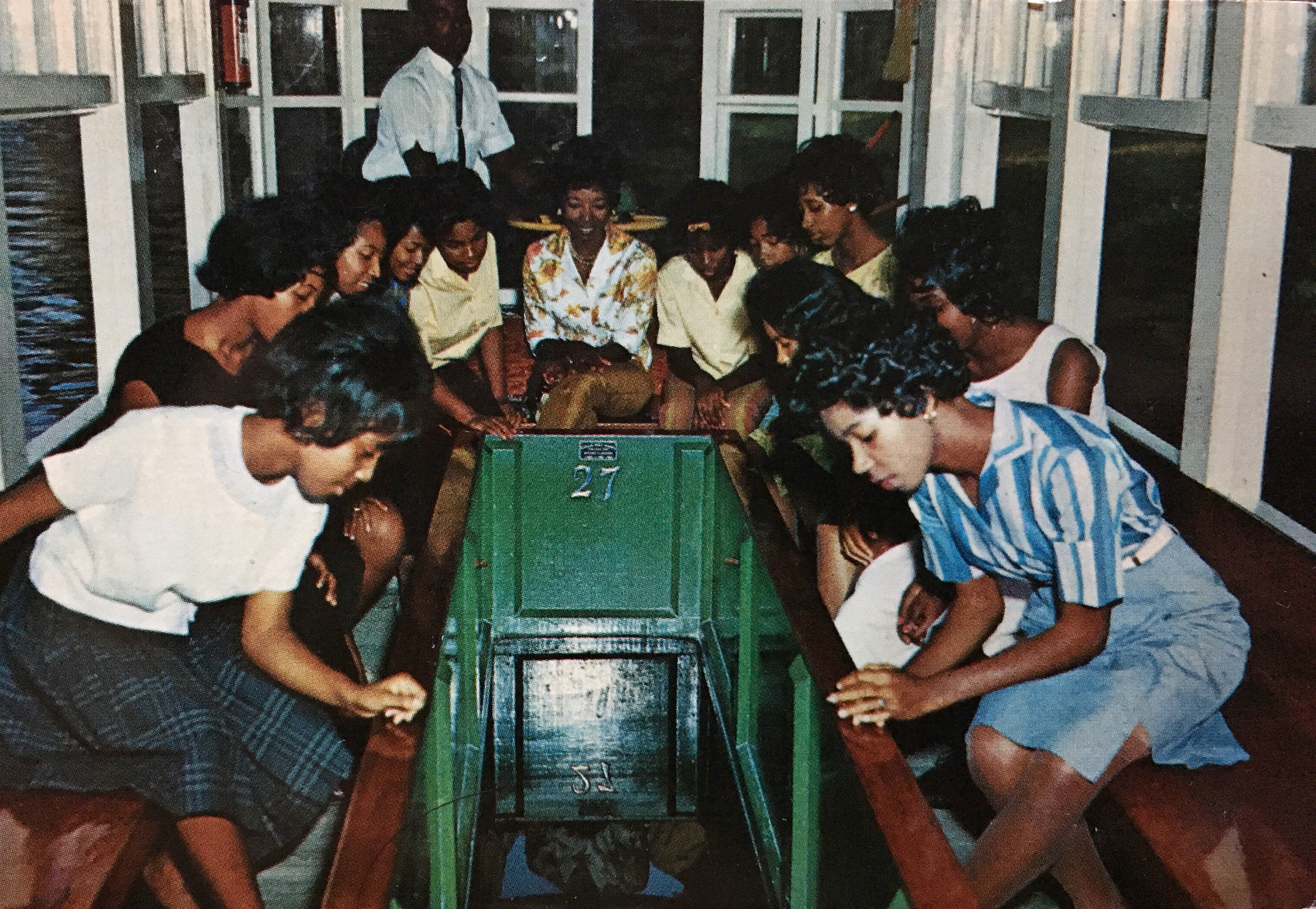
Photochrome postcard showing the glass-bottom boats at Paradise Park

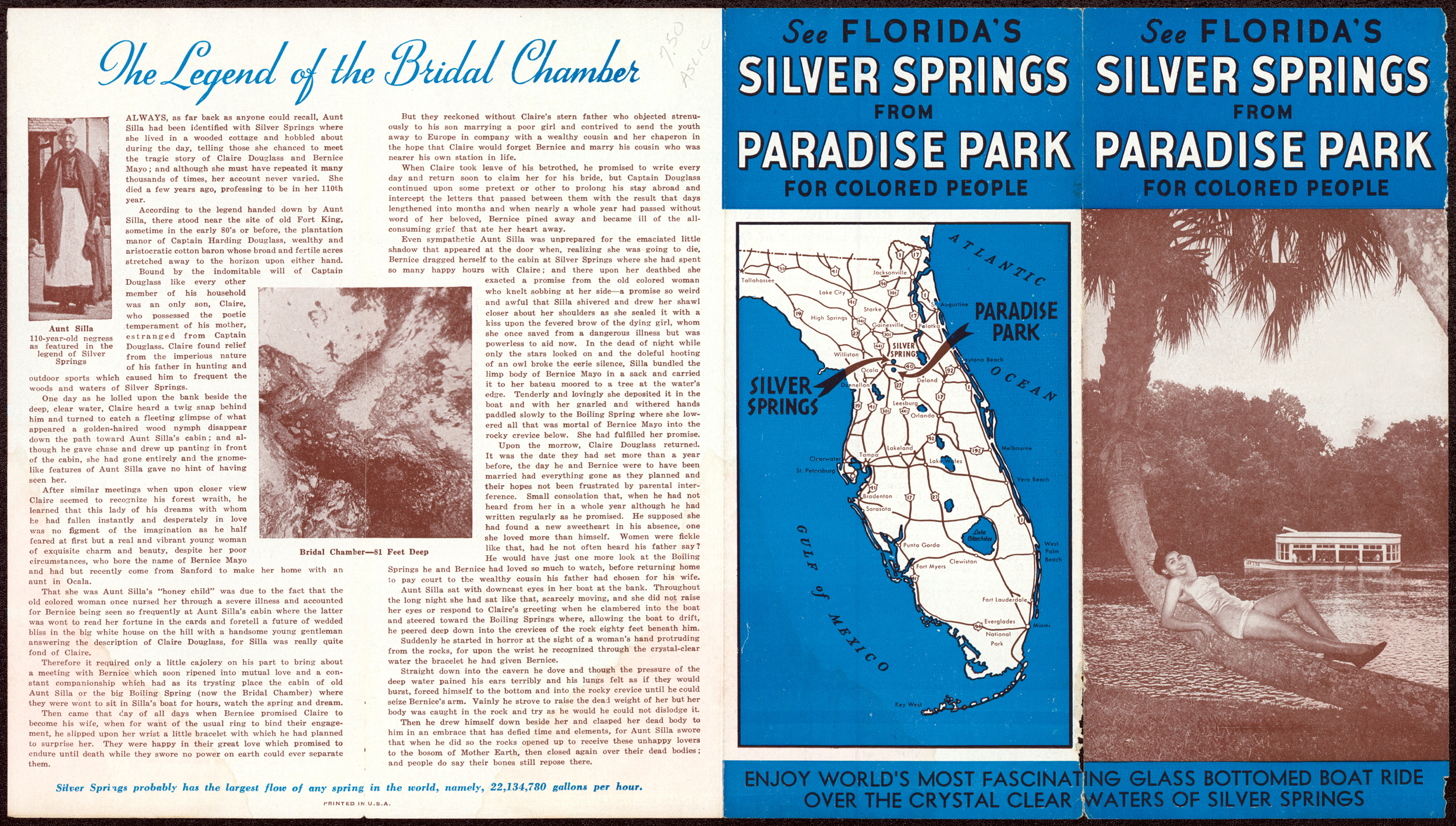
Promotional flyer for Paradise Park

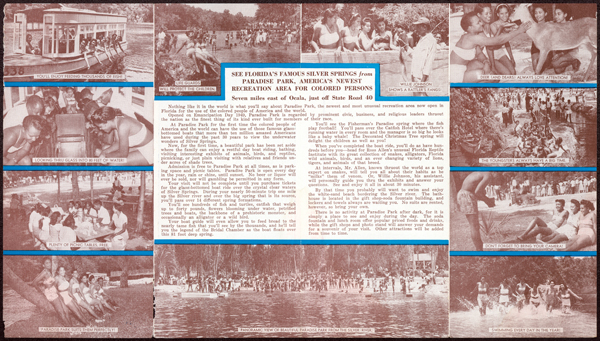
Promotional flyer for Paradise Park

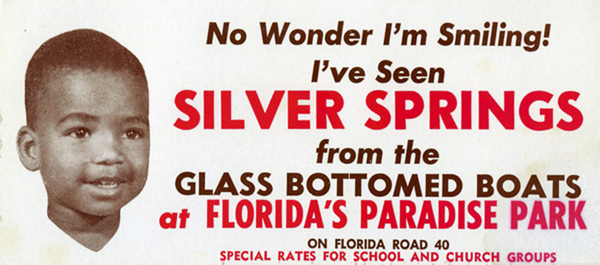
Promotional ad for Paradise Park

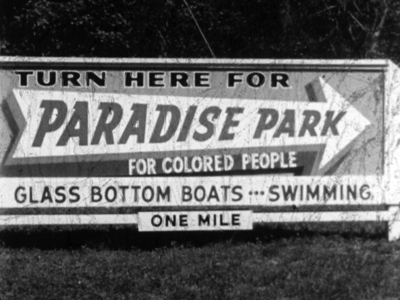
Sign: "Turn here for Paradise Park - For colored people - Glass-bottom boats - Swimming - One mile"

Paradise Park was a tourist attraction and the only local recreational facility "for colored people", as its sign said, about 1 mile (1.6 km) from Silver Springs, near Ocala, Florida. It offered similar features, such as glass-bottom boats, "jungle cruises," a petting zoo, a dance pavilion with jukebox, performers, a softball field, a horseshoe toss, and a sandy beach with lifeguards. It operated from 1949 to 1969, closing soon after desegregation of Silver Springs. It served African American patrons prohibited from Silver Springs' boat rides that were limited to whites only. As was the rule during the allegedly separate but equal period, "Paradise Park was alright, but it wasn't up on a par with the white parts of Silver Springs."

At the time, it was one of three beaches open for African Americans in the state of Florida. Admission was free, though swimming cost 35¢, which provided a towel and clothes storage. "Paradise Park drew about 100,000 visitors annually. People came, sometimes by the busload, from as far away as New York and California." At times, the park overflowed with visitors. One day there were 30 buses in the parking lot; on another occasion, 247 cars were counted. "Chartered buses brought visitors from many states." Brochures were distributed in Georgia and Alabama, seeking these customers. In 1953, Ebony magazine called it "the newest and largest recreational facility for Negroes in the South".

Churches held mass baptisms at Paradise Park, as well as picnics. Preachers and choirs had sunrise services. “Easter egg hunts, baptisms, and picnics were common and at Christmas, Santa Claus would cruise down the river on a glass-bottom boat to pass out candy, nuts, and fruit for young visitors. Herpetologist Ross Allen set up a reptile exhibit at the park, similar to the one located upriver at Silver Springs.” According to a sign in the promotional movie cited below, "Ross Allen's Wild Animal Exhibit" included "dozens of alligators, hundreds of snakes, monkeys, deer, birds, turtles, lizards, exotic animals" and "Ole Coochie", a "giant alligator". According to a brochure, there was "Ross Allen's unusual Reptile Institute, with its great collection of snakes, alligators, Florida wild animals, birds, and an ever changing variety of lions, tigers, and other animals of that breed. At intervals, Mr. Allen, known thruout the world as a top expert on snakes, will tell you all about their habits as he 'milks' them of venom."

On Labor Day, there was a beauty pageant, sponsored by a local American Legion post. "In 1949, Mildred Jones of Sanford was crowned the first Miss Paradise Park." The Future Farmers of America had their conventions there. The musician B. B. King once visited, as did Mary McLeod Bethune, who "didn't care too much" for Paradise Park "because it was segregated". There was a Bethune-Cookman College day, with the day's proceeds donated to the college.

Silver Springs began admitting black patrons in 1967. During Paradise Park's last season, 1968–69, it was open only Saturdays. Sundays, and holidays. It closed quietly in 1969.

The area that was Paradise Park is now covered by underbrush. It is remembered fondly by its former employees and visitors. "Paradise Park was our roots."

== See also ==
- American Beach, Florida
