= Silver Springs State Park =

State park in Florida, United States

- IUCN category V (protected landscape/seascape)
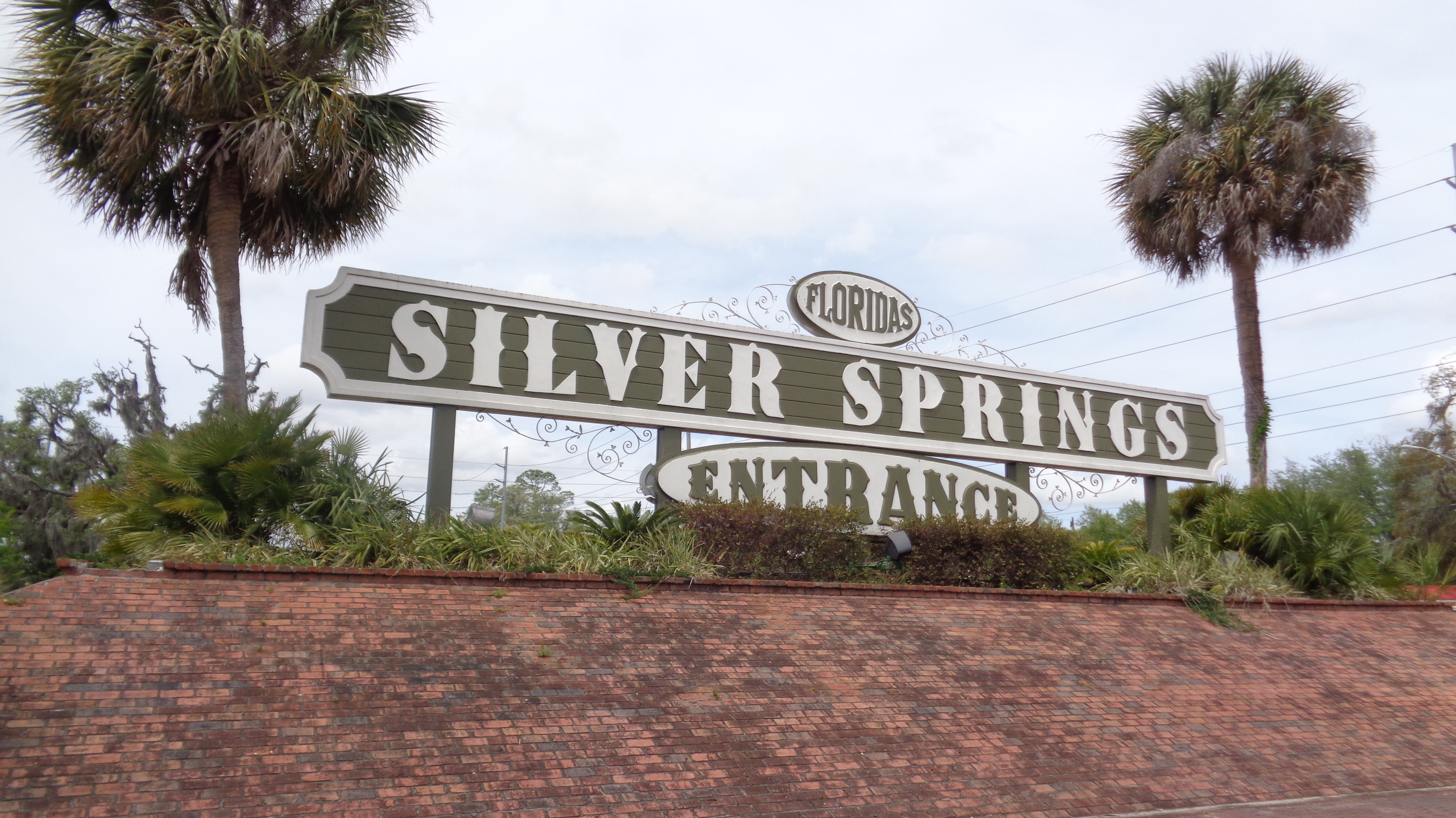
- Headspring Entrance Sign

- Location within Florida Location within the United States
- Interactive map of Silver Springs State Park
- Location: Marion County, Florida, United States
- Nearest city: Silver Springs
- Coordinates: 29°12′4″N 82°3′13″W
- Area: 5,000 acres (20 km^{2})
- Established: 2013 (as Silver Springs State Park)
- Governing body: Florida Department of Environmental Protection

Silver Springs State Park, formerly known as Silver River State Park, is a Florida state park located on the Silver River in Marion County. The park contains Silver Springs, one of the largest artesian spring systems in the world and Florida's first major tourist attraction.

== History ==
=== Silver Springs ===
The Silver Springs attraction dates to the 1870s, when glass-bottom boats first began operating on the crystal-clear waters. In the early 20th century, the site became a major tourist destination featuring jungle cruises, wildlife exhibits, and film locations for Hollywood movies, including several Tarzan films.

In 1985, the State of Florida purchased approximately 5,000 acres of surrounding land to protect it from development, establishing Silver River State Park. In 1993, the state acquired the main Silver Springs attraction, though it continued to operate under private management. On October 1, 2013, the state took full control of the headsprings area, merged it with the adjacent Silver River State Park, and officially created Silver Springs State Park.

=== State park ===
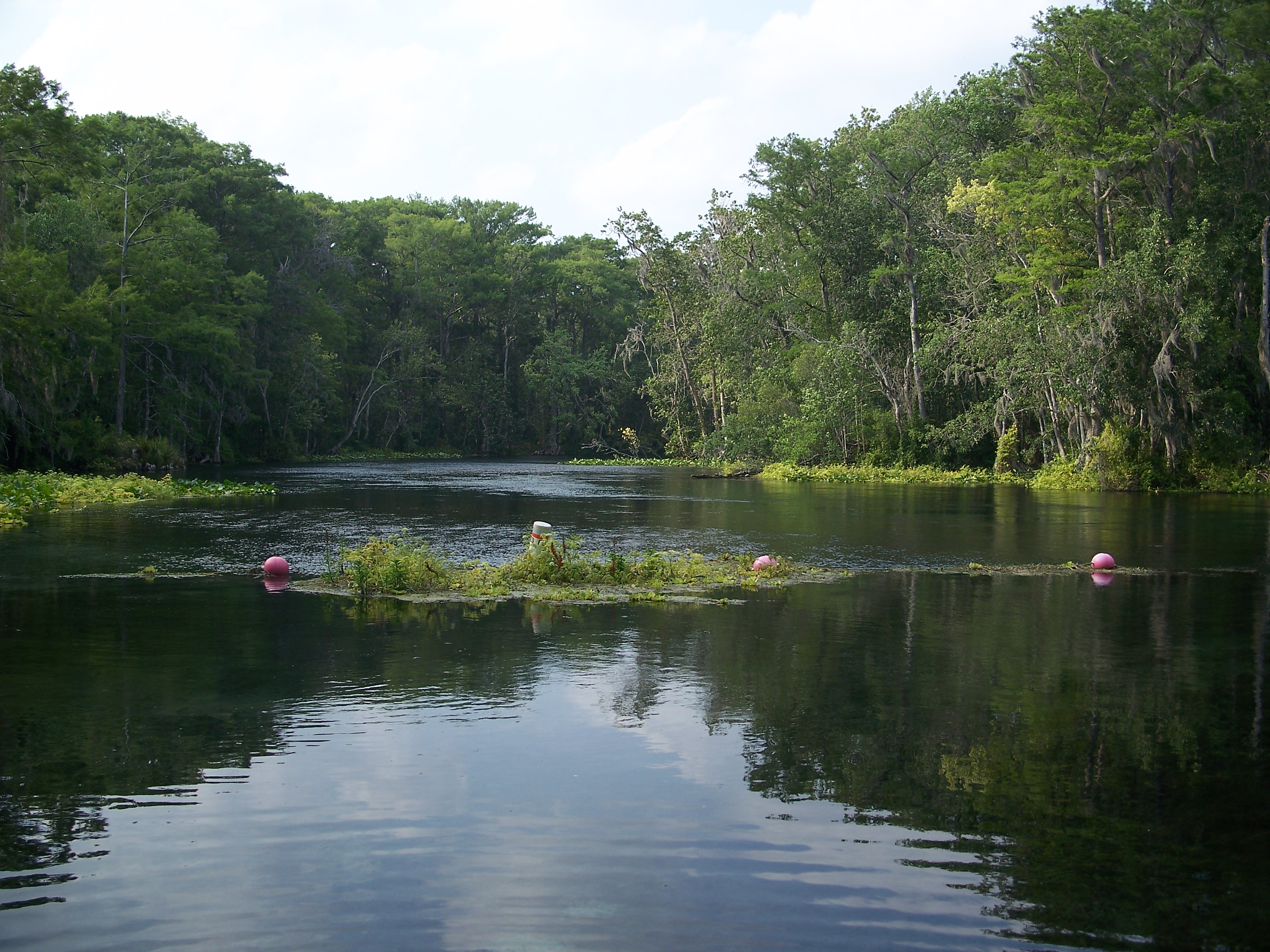
The Silver River from within the park.

In 1985, the State of Florida purchased about 5,000 acres of undeveloped land around Silver Springs to keep it from being developed. The land was turned over to the Department of Recreation and Parks in 1987, creating the Silver River State Park. The same year, Marion County Schools constructed the Silver River Museum and Environmental Education Center on the property. Little else was at the park until 1999, when the state began construction on a ranger station, campground, and kayak launch.

In 1993, the state purchased Silver Springs with the ultimate intention of taking it over. The previous owners continued to operate the attraction under lease. It went through several operators before Palace Entertainment took over management of Silver Springs Nature Theme Park in 2002. In January 2013, after years of declining profits and increasing environmental problems, the state took over control of the park, releasing Palace Entertainment from their obligations. The same year, they merged Silver Springs into Silver River State Park, creating Silver Springs State Park.

== Geography and Hydrology ==
The park spans about 5,000 acres and protects the Silver River, a five-mile spring-fed waterway that flows into the Ocklawaha River. Silver Springs is a first-magnitude spring system with an average discharge of over 550 million gallons per day. The park features sandhill forests, wetlands, and abundant wildlife, including manatees, alligators, turtles, fish, and birds. It was designated a National Natural Landmark in 1971.

=== Silver River ===
Silver Springs, located in the park, drains into the Silver River, a 4.5-mile (7.2 km) stream that flows east from the springs to the Ocklawaha River.

== Ecology ==
Among the wildlife of the park are nine-banded armadillos, white-tailed deer, wild boars, wild turkeys, foxes, American alligators, Sherman fox squirrels, and gopher tortoises, as well as coyotes, bobcats, and Florida black bears.

Also, a colony of non-native rhesus macaques were introduced to the park in early 1938 by a tour boat operator, known locally as "Colonel Tooey", to enhance his "Jungle Cruise" ride. A local legend that they are the descendants of monkeys used to enhance the scenery for the Tarzan movies that were shot in the area in the 1930s is not true, since no Tarzan movie filmed in the area featured rhesus macaques. The monkeys are allowed to live in Florida, due to their contributions to science.

The diversity of this waterway is among the highest in Florida. Since becoming part of the Florida state park system, the increased interest and reduced barriers to entry have brought many new visitors to the park. The damage to the river grasses and wildlife is a real concern.

== Recreation ==
Visitors can take world-famous glass-bottom boat tours, kayak or canoe the Silver River, hike or bike along 15 miles of trails, and camp at the full-facility campground. Other attractions include the Silver River Museum and Environmental Education Center, a pioneer village, historic gardens, and picnic areas.

=== Activities and amenities ===
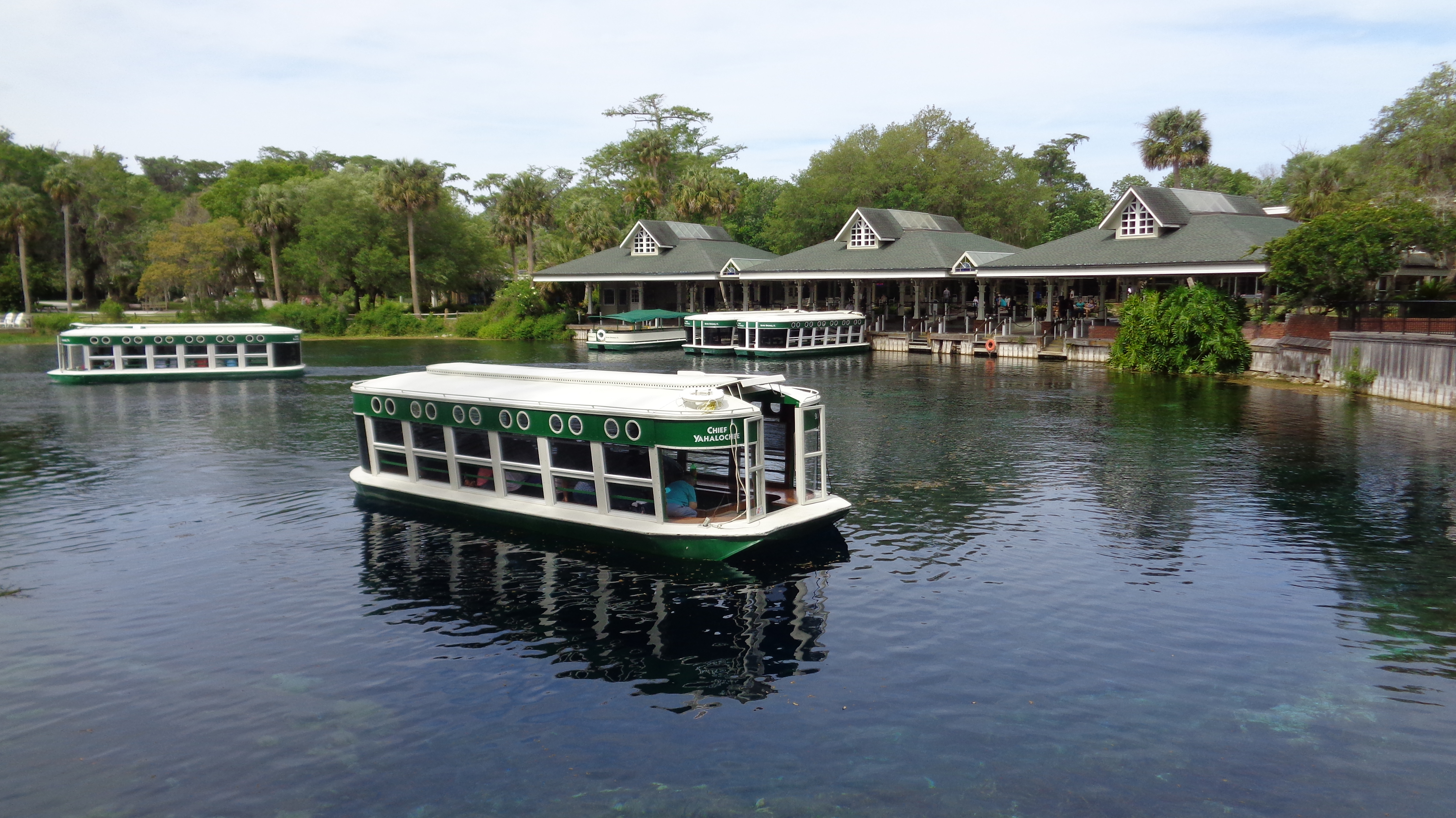
The Silver Springs glass-bottom boats at the headspring area in 2017

Glass-bottom boats are located within the park and are based at the site of the former Silver Springs Nature Theme Park.

Other activities include bicycling, canoeing, kayaking, camping, and wildlife viewing. Amenities include a museum and an environmental center that are open on weekends and major holidays. The park has 15 miles (24 km) of trails, access to the Silver River, 10 luxury cabins, and a 59-site, full-facility campground.

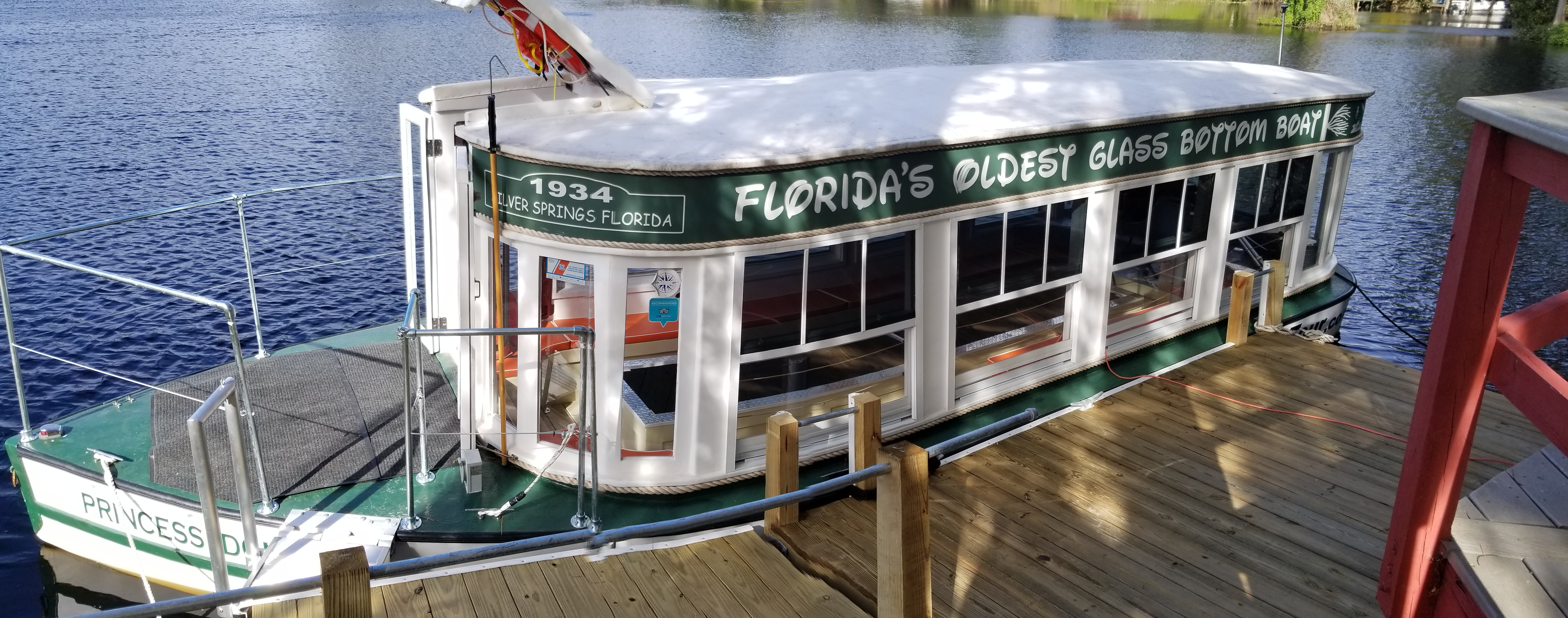
The oldest operational glass bottom boat in Florida

The Silver River Museum and Environmental Education Center, with educational facilities, is run by the Marion County Public School System in cooperation with the Florida Park Service. The center has a village of restored or "newly built" 19th-century farm buildings (houses, meeting house, sheds, blacksmith, etc.) and a museum on the natural and social history of the area. Used during the week by the school district for classes, on the weekends, it is open to the public. One week, early in November, the center also puts on the Ocali County Days as a fund raiser. This is a 19th-century, living history event with displays, talks, and performances incorporating living historians. For that Tuesday through Friday, it is open to public, private, and home schooled children and their teachers, who have made reservations with the center. The event is open to the general public on Saturday and Sunday and has become a popular annual attraction in the area.

=== Hours ===
The park is open from 8:00 am till sundown year round. The gate remains open until 10:00 pm on Fridays for campers.

== Pop Culture ==
=== Movies filmed at Silver Springs ===
- Tarzan the Ape Man (1932)
- Tarzan and His Mate (1934)
- The Yearling (1946)
- Creature from the Black Lagoon (1954)
- Underwater! (1955)
- Rebel Without A Cause (1955)
- Revenge of the Creature (1955)
- Sea Hunt, television series (1958–1961)
- Thunderball (1965)
- Blindfold (1966)
- Moonraker (1979)
- Never Say Never Again (1983)
- Smokey and the Bandit Part 3 (1983)
- Legend (1985)

== See also ==
- Silver Springs (attraction)
- Silver River (Florida)
- List of Florida state parks
