= Historic Jefferson Railway =

Coordinates: 32.7588°N 94.3416°W

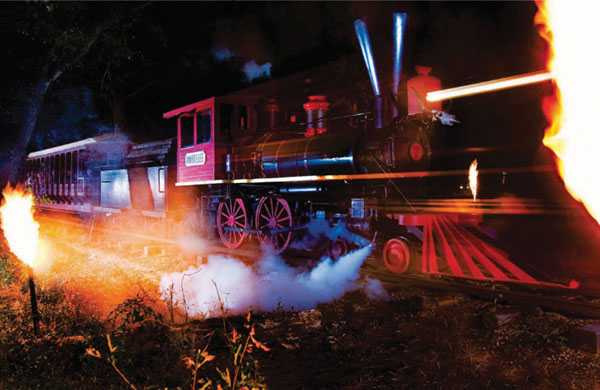
- Steam locomotive of the Historic Jefferson Railway, since sold to Kirby Family Farm

Overview
- Reporting mark: JCB
- Locale: Jefferson, Texas
- Dates of operation: 1985–2024

Technical
- Track gauge: 3 ft (914 mm)
- Length: 3 miles (4.8 kilometres)

The Historic Jefferson Railway (sometimes known as the Jefferson and Cypress Bayou Railway) was a 3 ft (914 mm) narrow gauge railroad in Jefferson, Texas. It was an insular line that followed the Big Cypress Bayou for approximately three miles. The line had a single main track with loops at both ends to turn the whole train as a unit without any switching maneuvers.

Its route passed Jefferson Ordnance Magazine, one of only a few remaining Confederate powder magazines from the United States' Civil War, which was listed on the U.S. National Register of Historic Places.

== History ==
The railway was constructed in 1985 by the City of Jefferson, which purchased the rolling stock of the defunct Six Gun Territory amusement park in Silver Springs, Florida. During the late 1980s Hangtown, a mockup of a western town, was constructed along the line. It was the backdrop for an extensive stunt show, which included multiple shoot-outs. Eventually Jefferson could no longer afford to operate the railway and it was put up for sale.

A series of private owners attempted to resurrect the line but it shut down completely by the mid-90s. By 1999 a local entrepreneur had purchased the train, track, depot, and property in order to keep the riverfront free from development. Aside from running the train sporadically to keep easement access, the railway remained closed. During this period, Hangtown became neglected and eventually collapsed.

A family partnership acquired the railway in early 2002. The family announced their retirement in March 2024, closing the railway and putting it up for sale.

== Locomotives ==
The Historic Jefferson Railway originally featured two 4-4-0 steam locomotives, the Robert E. Lee, engine no 7, and the Sam Houston, engine no. 4, which had been originally built in 1964 by Crown Metal Products for the Six Gun Territory Amusement park in Silver Springs, Florida. Both engines were sold to the Jefferson Railway in 1985, retaining their names and numbers. The Robert E. Lee served as the motive power, while the Sam Houston was kept as a parts source. In 2017, the Sam Houston was sold to the Kirby Family Farm in Williston, Florida in 2017 and the Robert E. Lee was sold to the same buyer in 2019. Afterwards, the railway operated a small gasoline-powered locomotive named "Critter", built by the Plymouth Locomotive Works, which ran until the railway closed in 2024.

== See also ==
- List of heritage railroads in the United States
