= Silver Springs, Florida =

Census-designated place in Florida, US

- Census-designated place
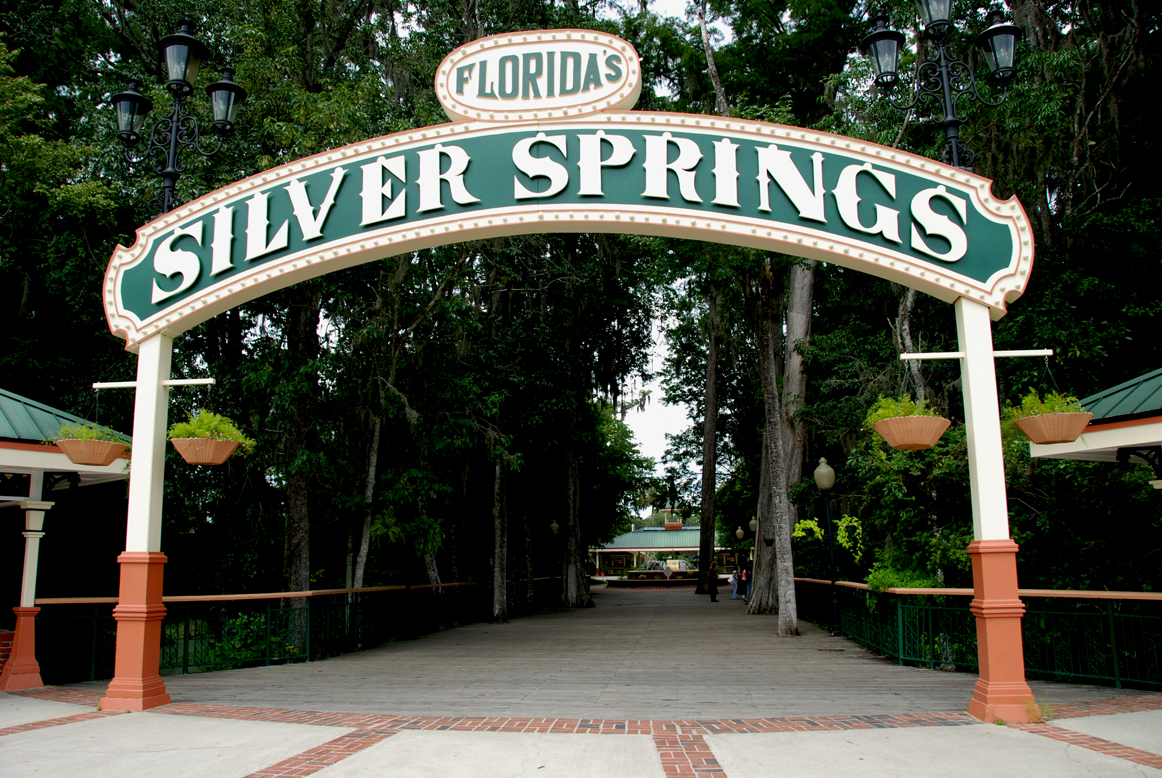
- Silver Springs State Park

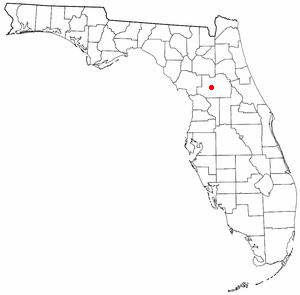
- Location of Silver Springs, Florida
- Coordinates: 29°13′09″N 82°03′21″W
- Country: United States
- State: Florida
- County: Marion County

Area
  - Total: 6.19 sq mi (16.0 km^{2})
  - Land: 6.16 sq mi (16.0 km^{2})
  - Water: 0.03 sq mi (0.078 km^{2})
- Elevation: 49 ft (15 m)

Population (2020 census)
  - Total: 2,844
  - Density: 461.7/sq mi (178.3/km^{2})
- Time zone: UTC-5 (Eastern (EST))
  - Summer (DST): UTC-4 (EDT)
- ZIP Codes: 34488-34489 (Silver Springs); 34470, 34479 (Ocala)
- FIPS code: 12-66125
- GNIS feature ID: 2805193

Silver Springs is an unincorporated community and census-designated place (CDP) in Marion County of northern Florida. It is the site of the Silver Springs, a group of artesian springs and a historic tourist attraction that is now part of Silver Springs State Park. The community is part of the Ocala metropolitan area. It was first listed as a CDP for the 2020 census, when it had a population of 2,844. One of Florida's first tourist attractions, the springs drew visitors even before the U.S. Civil War. Glass-bottom boats have been a popular way to see the 242-acre (98 ha) complex. A small amusement park with various animals, a concert stage, a carousel, and exhibits also developed.

== History ==
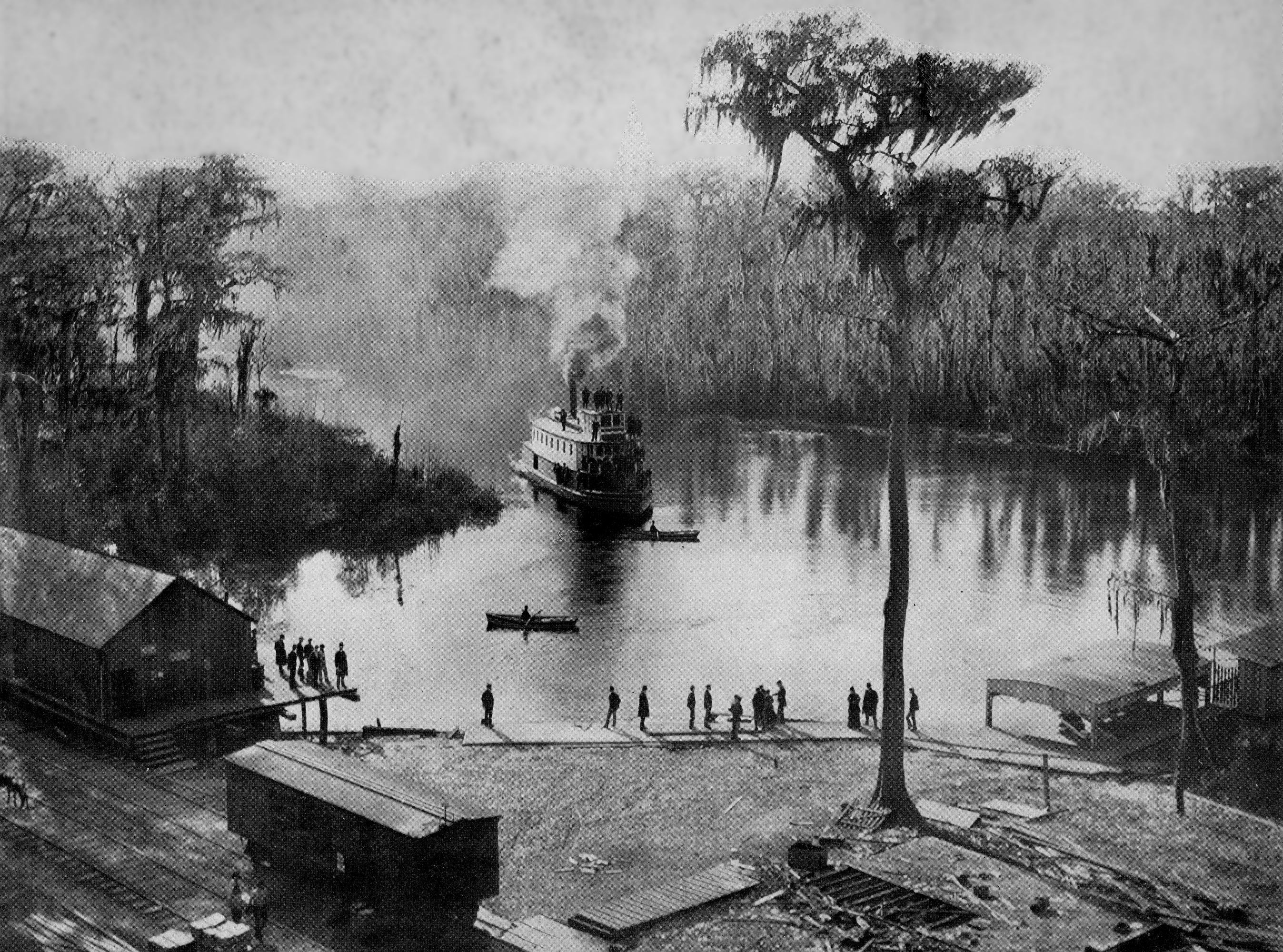
Steamboat and railroad at Silver Springs in 1886

Silver Springs was founded in 1852.

Since the mid-19th century, the natural environment of Silver Springs has attracted visitors from throughout the United States. The glass-bottom boat was invented and tours of the springs began in the late 1870s. In the 1920s, W. Carl Ray and W.M. "Shorty" Davidson, after leasing the land from Ed Carmichael (upon whose death the springs were left to the University of Florida), developed the land around the headwaters of the Silver River into an attraction that eventually became known as Silver Springs Nature Theme Park. The attraction featured native animal exhibits, amusement rides, and 30 or 90-minute glass-bottom boat tours of the springs. The 1934 'Princess Donna' is the oldest and only remaining operational boat from this bygone era. The "Princess Donna' currently operates on the Rainbow River in Dunnellon, Florida. In 2013, the State of Florida took over operations of Silver Springs and combined it with the adjacent Silver River State Park to form the new Silver Springs State Park. The T. W. Randall House on the National Register of Historic Places is located to the northeast.

Several defunct tourist attractions were once located near Silver Springs. The Western-themed Six Gun Territory theme park, which included several attractions such as the Southern Railway and Six Gun narrow-gauge (3 ft or 914 mm) railroad, operated from 1963 to 1984. The Wild Waters park, also in Silver Springs, operated from 1978 to 2016.

Silver Springs was "whites only" until 1967. From 1949 to 1969, African Americans were served by nearby Paradise Park, Florida, which closed when Silver Springs integrated racially.

== Cattle ranch development ==
Canadian billionaire Frank Stronach has been building the Adena Springs Ranch for cattle, an abattoir, residential property development, and a Thoroughbred horse farm in the area, stirring concern over plans for water use and how groundwater draw will affect the springs.

== Geography ==
Silver Springs is in central Marion County and is bordered to the southwest by the city of Ocala, the county seat. According to the U.S. Census Bureau, the Silver Springs CDP has a total area of 6.2 square miles (16 km^{2}), of which 0.03 square miles (0.08 km^{2}), or 0.50%, are water. The springs, in the center of the community, flow out to form the Silver River, which runs 4 miles (6 km) east to the Ocklawaha River.

=== Transportation ===
The main road through Silver Springs is State Road 40, which runs east and west from Rainbow Lakes Estates to Ormond Beach in Volusia County. State Road 326 terminates at SR 40, as does State Road 35, which becomes County Road 35 north of SR 40 before terminating north of SR 326. County Roads 314 and 314A are also important north-south county roads that run west and into the Ocala National Forest.

== Demographics ==
Silver Springs first appeared as a census designated place in the 2020 U.S. census.

=== 2020 census ===
As of the 2020 census, Silver Springs had a population of 2,844. Silver Springs was first listed as a CDP for the 2020 census. The median age was 39.6 years. 21.8% of residents were under the age of 18 and 20.7% of residents were 65 years of age or older. For every 100 females there were 86.1 males, and for every 100 females age 18 and over there were 84.2 males age 18 and over.

87.0% of residents lived in urban areas, while 13.0% lived in rural areas.

There were 1,342 households in Silver Springs, of which 22.8% had children under the age of 18 living in them. Of all households, 28.0% were married-couple households, 23.3% were households with a male householder and no spouse or partner present, and 39.0% were households with a female householder and no spouse or partner present. About 39.2% of all households were made up of individuals and 16.5% had someone living alone who was 65 years of age or older.

There were 1,490 housing units, of which 9.9% were vacant. The homeowner vacancy rate was 4.0% and the rental vacancy rate was 5.7%.

Racial composition as of the 2020 census
Race	Number	Percent
White	1,783	62.7%
Black or African American	644	22.6%
American Indian and Alaska Native	20	0.7%
Asian	18	0.6%
Native Hawaiian and Other Pacific Islander	1	0.0%
Some other race	114	4.0%
Two or more races	264	9.3%
Hispanic or Latino (of any race)	360	12.7%

== Notable people ==
- Ross Allen, herpetologist
- Bruce Mozert, photographer
- Ted Potter Jr., PGA Tour professional golfer

== Gallery ==
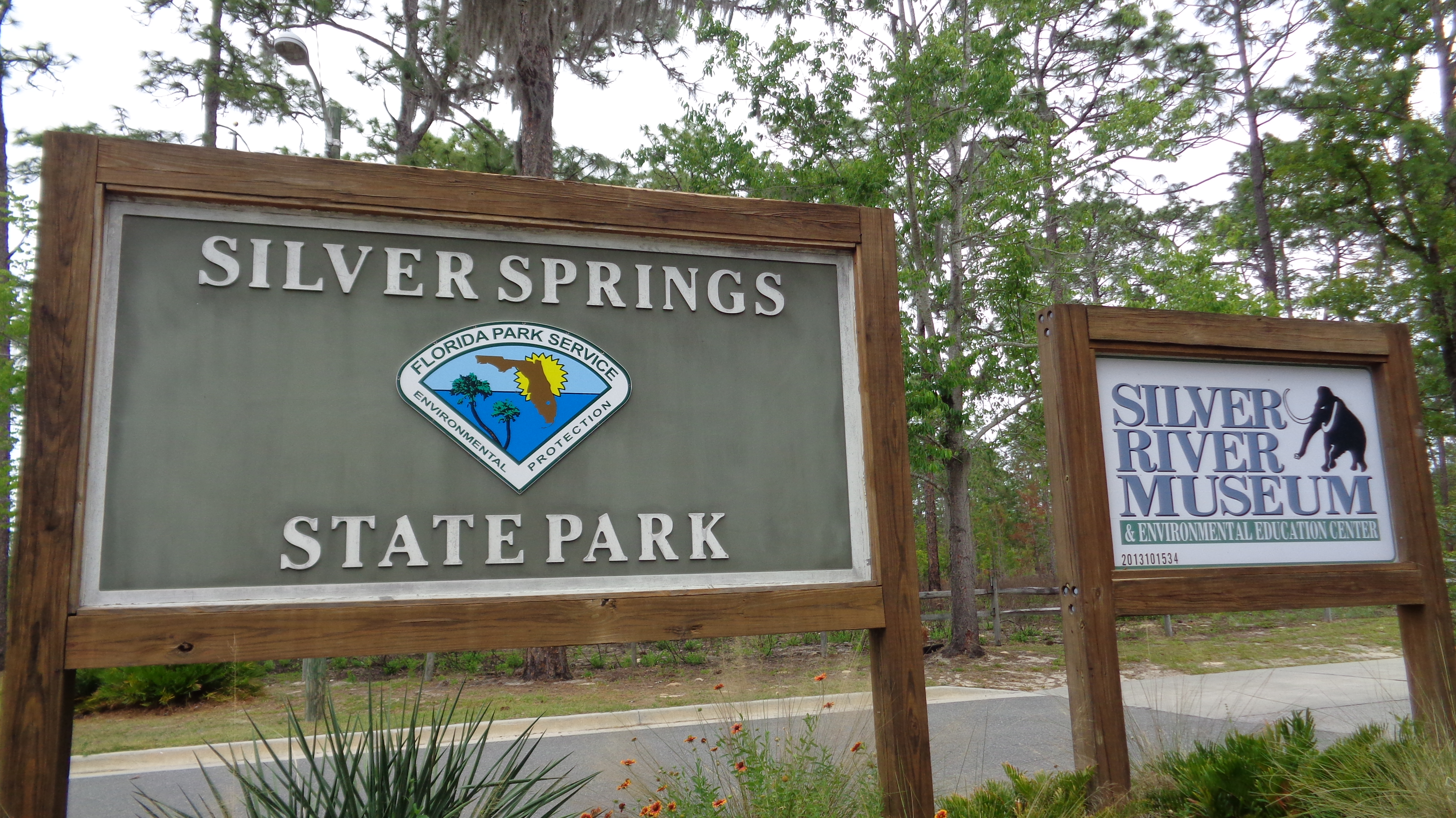
Silver Springs State Park

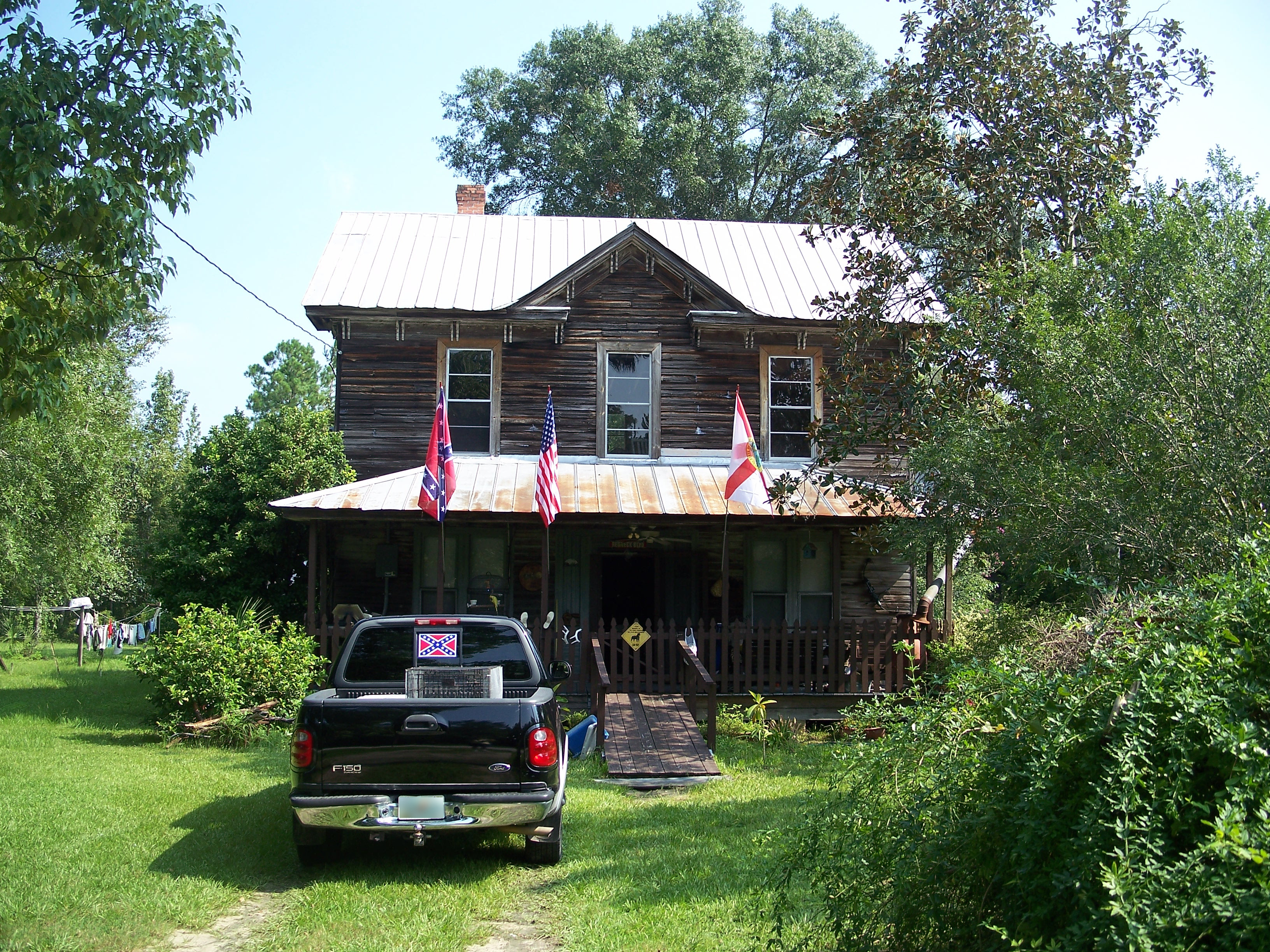
T. W. Randall House

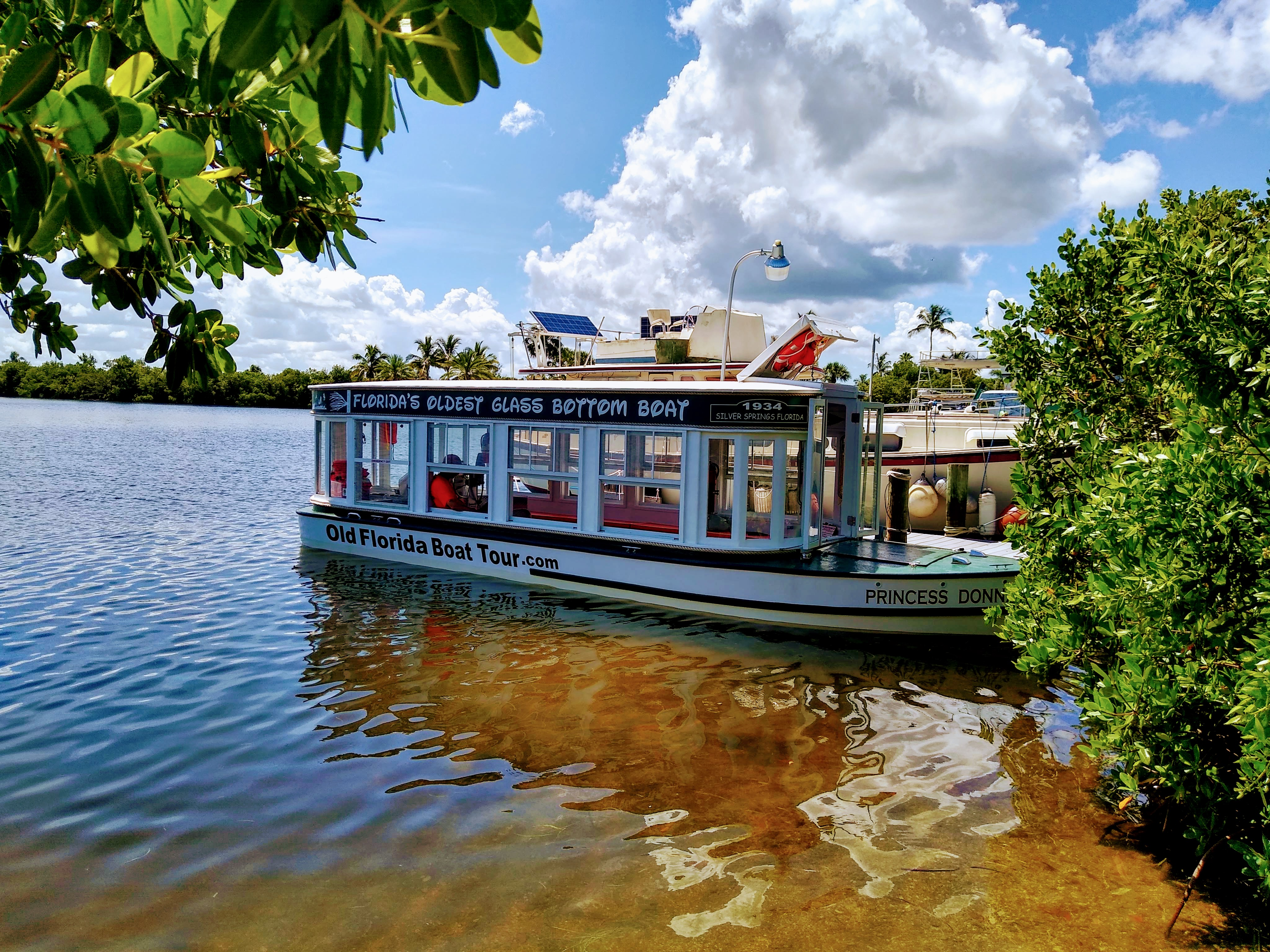
The Princess Donna

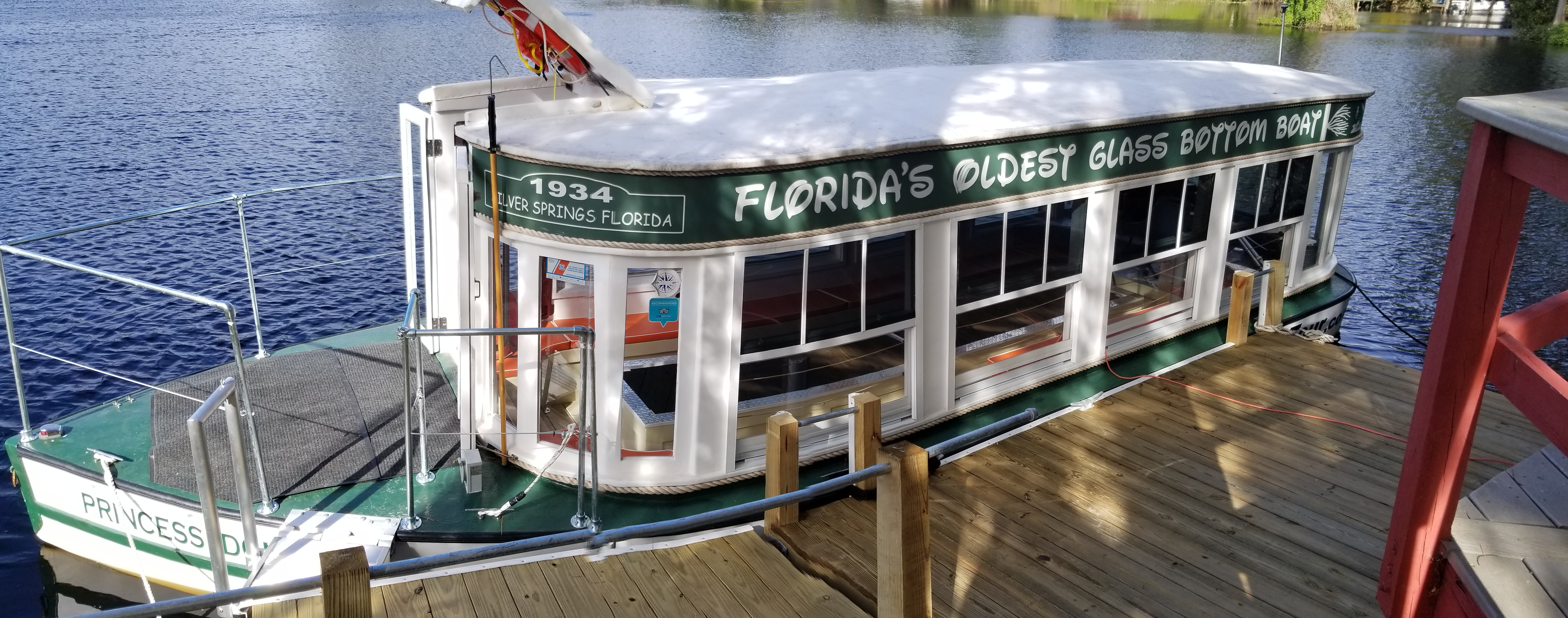
The oldest operational glass-bottom boat in Florida
