= Silver Springs (attraction) =

Group of artesian springs in Marion County

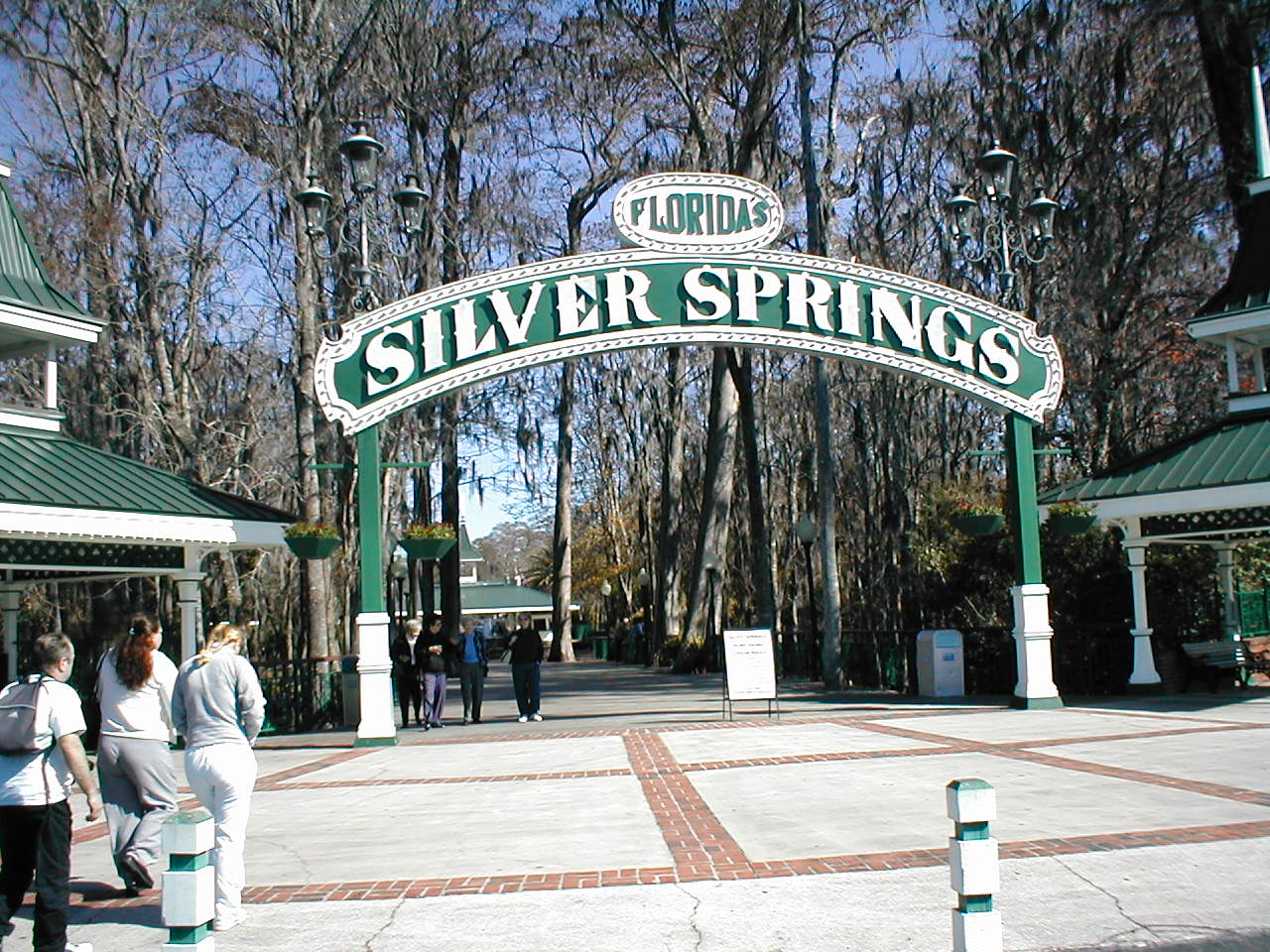
- Park entrance
- Interactive map of Silver Springs
- 29.21806°N 82.05454°W
- Date opened: 1878 (when glass-bottom boats were first used)
- Location: Silver Springs, Florida, United States of America
- Major exhibits: Glass-bottom boat rides
- Owner: State of Florida
- Website: www.silversprings.com

Silver Springs is a group of artesian springs that feed into the Silver River in Marion County, Florida. It is the largest artesian spring in the world and the site of the oldest commercial tourist attraction in Florida, and was designated a National Natural Landmark in 1971. Its main features are the glass-bottom boat tours on the river, which have operated there, in various forms, since 1878. Long privately owned and operated, the springs area was formerly the site of a small amusement park, Silver Springs Nature Theme Park.

The springs became a destination for tourists traveling up the St. Johns and Silver rivers via steamboat in the late 19th century. It changed hands several times over the years, with various operators introducing boat rides and related attractions. One such planned attraction introduced a group of rhesus macaques to an island in the Silver River; the monkeys quickly escaped and formed freeranging troops still present in the area. Starting in 1916 Silver Springs became a shooting location for Hollywood films; films shot there include Tarzan Finds a Son (1939) and five subsequent Tarzan movies and Revenge of the Creature, the sequel to Creature from the Black Lagoon.

In the 1990s the first thorough scientific studies of the springs were conducted and wildlife rehabilitation was started. That year, the State of Florida bought the underlying land, while private businesses continued to operate the attractions and concessions. Environmental issues such as nitrate runoff, related to development in the region, adversely affected the park's health and tourist revenues declined. On January 23, 2013, the Florida Cabinet announced the state would take over the facility after the end of the 2013 summer season, and that the park operators would receive a $4 million buyout of their lease. In October 2013, the State of Florida took over operations of Silver Springs Nature Theme Park and combined the property with the adjacent Silver River State Park to form Silver Springs State Park.

== History ==
=== 1800s ===
The springs were the first tourist attraction in Florida. In the 1860s, Samuel O. Howse bought the 242 acres surrounding the headwaters of the Silver River. Several years after the American Civil War, the springs began to attract tourists from the North via steamboats up the Silver River. Silver Springs gained national attention through journals and guidebooks, and became a mandatory stop on the "grand tour" of Florida.

In the late 1870s, Hullam Jones and Phillip Morell developed the glass-bottom boat and the glass-bottom rowboat, respectively; these were used to take visitors on the river to give them a unique view of the springs. The first railroad to reach Silver Springs, the Silver Springs, Ocala and Gulf Railroad, went into operation by the end of 1879 and transported people and goods from the river landing at the headspring area to the nearby town of Ocala. In 1880, former president Ulysses S. Grant visited the area. In the 1890s, commercial-sized glass-bottom boats were developed. H.L. Anderson purchased Silver Springs and the surrounding area from Howse in 1898.

=== 1900-1961 ===
C. Carmichael bought 80 acres of land from Anderson in 1909 for less than $3,000. He soon refitted the tour boats with cushioned seats and canopies to enhance their comfort. The Seven Swans was filmed on location at Silver Springs in 1916; it was the first known use of the Springs as a setting for cinematography. President Calvin Coolidge visited the Springs in the 1920s.

Ocalans W. Carl Ray and W. M. "Shorty" Davidson became partners and leased the land around the Springs in 1924. They incorporated improvements for the tour boats, adding gasoline engines in 1925. Ross Allen, a noted herpetologist, opened the "Ross Allen Reptile Institute" on some of the land near the head of the Springs. It attracted thousands of tourists to the site for many decades. In 1932 the glass-bottom boats were equipped with electric motors. The 'Princess Donna' built in 1934 still exists and is the only remaining operational boat from this era. The 'Princess Donna' currently tours on Jug Creek in Bokeelia, FL. It's also the oldest commercial tour boat in the state.

In the 1930s Colonel Tooey, a concessionaire who operated the "Jungle Cruise" boat ride, established the first troop of wild rhesus monkeys on an island in the Silver River. He planned to use the attraction of the colony as one of the sights on his Jungle Cruise, but did not know that the rhesus monkeys were excellent swimmers. They quickly escaped the island, forming their own feral troops along the river. Rhesus monkeys are still seen along the river.

The Seven Swans was filmed at Silver Springs in 1916, but it was not until 1932 that the location become popular as a filming hot-spot. It was the location for filming of Tarzan the Ape Man, featuring Johnny Weissmuller. During the 1930s and early 1940s, five more of these original Tarzan movies were filmed at Silver Springs. In 1954 Creature from the Black Lagoon was filmed there.

The Silver Springs attraction was restricted to white patrons only until 1969. Carl Ray and W.M. Davidson opened a nearby attraction, Paradise Park, which was "for colored people only", in 1949. Paradise Park became a popular attraction for Black American tourists, and closed in 1969 after Silver Springs became integrated.

By 1950 the number of guests annually at Silver Springs was more than 800,000 people. On June 17, 1955, a fire destroyed many buildings by the entrance of Silver Springs, including ticket offices, the gift shop, the cafe, and a storage building. The buildings were rebuilt, and a new building was added across from the dock, with space for retail stores and restaurants. It survives today. In 1958, episodes of the television series Sea Hunt were filmed at Silver Springs, continuing to the end of the series in 1961.

=== 1962-1983 ===
On May 1, 1962, Ray and Davidson were talking to the American Broadcasting Company about selling Silver Springs for $7.5 million, but Ray's son W. C. (Buck) Ray Jr., general manager of the park, denied it. On May 29, representatives announced that Silver Springs was being sold to ABC-Paramount. The sale was completed on October 31, 1962. The sale included the "lease of the Springs, all of the buildings and about 3,900 acres of land from the head of the Springs to the Ocklawaha River". The sale did not include independent concessions such as the Ross Allen Reptile Institute and Tommy Bartlett's Deer Ranch.

ABC wanted to control all the attractions, and in June 1963 gave Bartlett a 30-day notice to move his business or sell it to them. Media attention was drawn, as Bartlett said his lease had been extended to January 29, 1967, before Ray and Davidson sold the park to ABC. The parties had a pre-trial conference planned for April 15, 1965, but settled on April 9, 1965; Bartlett turned over the Deer Ranch and all of its contents to ABC. Allen also eventually made a deal with Silver Springs Inc. and sold his Institute. Their agreement allowed him to stay as director of the institute, which he did for years until his retirement.

In October 1971, the natural Silver Springs were declared a National Natural Landmark, recognized as a national resource. In 1973 Silver Springs started a wildlife rehabilitation program.

From 1974 to 1978 ABC expanded development at Silver Springs and the surrounding area. In 1974 they started to renovate a 5-acre island. Cypress Island opened as an attraction in November 1974, with formal opening in the spring. Developments included the Cypress Gift Shop and an open-air beer pavilion. Activities and exhibits on the island included a new facility for the Ross Allen Reptile Institute, with three large wooden amphitheaters for reptile shows, and some animal exhibits. The Jungle Cruise loading dock was moved to the island.

ABC developed a sister water park, Wild Waters, giving 450 press representatives a tour of all the Silver Springs facilities on April 28, 1978, before opening the next day to the public.

=== 1984-1999 ===
In 1984, ABC sold the land occupied by Silver Springs and Wild Waters to Florida Leisure Attractions. In 1989 Florida Leisure Acquisition Corporation bought the land. It opened a 35-acre "Jeep Safari" in 1990. Visitors are taken into the forest to see wild animals, such as the rhesus monkeys, or entertainment artifacts, such as the tree house built for use in filming the 1930s Tarzan movies. In 1991 "Lost River Voyage" opened to the public. The boat dock was located where the TV series Sea Hunt was filmed. The boat tour took guests 1 mile down the Silver River to a small island where zookeepers showcased native animals. The boat then returned to dock with its passengers.

In 1993 the first comprehensive scientific study of Silver Springs' main spring was conducted, including geological, paleontological and biological studies of the spring. It is the largest artesian spring in the United States. In early 1993 Florida Leisure Acquisition Corporation (FLAC) sold the land occupied by Silver Springs and Wild Waters to the State of Florida, but continued to manage the parks under a long-term lease. A weekend concert series was begun, featuring the top Country and Pop musical acts of the era. The concerts were staged on a twelve-acre portion of the park known as "The Great Lawn", and were later relocated to the newly built Twin Oaks Mansion, which served as the stage for the events, leaving the entire Great Lawn area for audience seating. The annual concert series showcased 35 to 40 concert events per year for 16 years, until the park was released back to the state of Florida. All shows were hosted and emceed by Hall of Fame deejay Freddy Carr, who became known as "The Voice Of Silver Springs".

In 1994, FLAC opened "A Touch of Garlits," a museum of antique cars and race cars. It opened the White Alligator exhibit a year later in 1995. In 1996, Ogden Entertainment of Florida, Inc. acquired the lease for Silver Springs and Wild Waters. It initiated a multimillion-dollar expansion project in 1997, finishing in early 1999. The largest expansion in Silver Springs history, this project developed the attractions of "World of Bears", "Big Gator Lagoon", "Panther Prowl", "Kids Ahoy!", the Twin Oaks Mansion, and other elements in the park. It moved the Giraffe exhibit. In 1999, Steve Irwin visited the park to film segments for his documentary "The Crocodile Hunter: Swimming with Alligators".

=== 2000-present ===
On January 14, 2000, the state renamed Cypress Island as Ross Allen Island in honor of the late herpetologist who directed his institute at the park from the 1930s until the 1970s. On January 14, the "Florida Natives" exhibit was opened to the public. Later in 2000, SmartParks, Inc. acquired the lease to Silver Springs and Wild Waters. In March 2002, SmartParks failed to pay the $1.2 million annual lease payment to the Florida Department of Environmental Protection.

In July 2002, SmartParks sold Silver Springs/Wild Waters to Palace Entertainment. Palace signed a 20-year management agreement with the state. On March 8, 2004, it closed the "Jungle Cruise" and sold all the associated animals to the Micanopy Zoological Preserve. The attraction was redesigned to show guests Florida history, and was named the Fort King River Cruise, opening in the summer of 2004. Also in 2004, Palace built "The Lighthouse" ride and the Fantastic Fountains water show. These three new attractions were opened on July 8, 2004.

The springs began to exhibit problems affecting many springs in Florida, associated with modern development: fertilizer runoff and septic outflow contain nitrates, which resulted in the overgrowth of brown algae. Thick algae mats have formed on the water, and alligators use them for sunning, but the algae is destroying the river habitat. Increased development in the surrounding area has drawn more water from the aquifer, resulting in a dramatic decrease in the volume of water from the springs. Since before 2000, flow has dropped from 510 million gallons per day (mgd) to 346 mgd in 2012.

The pollution has had other adverse effects: a study concluded that the fish population has decreased 90% compared to 1950s levels. To prevent storm runoff from carrying pollution into the springhead, the parking lot will be moved from the area along the waterway.

The last two giraffes at Silver Springs, Kimba and Khama, died on November 7, 2011, and December 19, 2012. They were mates, and were both born at Silver Springs (in 1982 and 1987, respectively). "Frank the Tank", an Aldabra tortoise who had lived in the park for nearly 40 years, died on April 19, 2012. He was the oldest animal in the park, being approximately over 100 years old.

The park's profit margin over ten years fell from 23.5% to a meager 5.3%, and Palace wanted out of their lease before they began losing money. In January 2013, the State of Florida announced it would begin managing the park on October 1 of that year. Palace Entertainment agreed to pay a $4 million buyout to end their lease. The private park closed as of September 21, 2013; it became part of the state park system.

== Areas ==
Although Silver Springs does not have official "areas", the following are areas of attractions and animal exhibits.

=== Entrance ===
The main gift shop is located near the entrance. Three flagpoles mark a fork in the path, and the head of Silver Springs. A 1972 plaque identifies Silver Springs as a National Natural Landmark. To the left are shops and restaurants. To the right is a waiting area and loading dock for tours by glass-bottomed boats.

=== Ross Allen Island ===
Ross Allen Island, known as Cypress Point Island, Cypress Point and Cypress Island at various times, is a man-made boardwalk area on a 5 1/2-acre island. It opened in November 1974. In 1975 it mainly contained the revamped Ross Allen Reptile Institute, which included three wooden amphitheaters for animal shows, and multiple exhibits for reptiles such as alligators, turtles and snakes.

Also, the Jungle Cruise boat dock was moved to the island soon after it opened, and had six new boats that were electrically powered (rather than by diesel engine), could hold 70 people, and had a speed of 8-knots when fully loaded. When it opened, the island also had a gift shop (Cypress Market), a snack shop and an open-air beer pavilion (Billy Bowlegs Cafe). During the 1997-1998 expansion of Silver Springs, "Big Gator Lagoon" and "Panther Prowl" were added to Cypress Island.

The area was renamed Ross Allen Island on January 14, 2000, in honor of Allen's long-time contribution to Silver Springs through the Ross Allen Reptile Institute. Also on January 14, the Florida Natives exhibit was opened to the public.

Ross Allen Island was closed in March 2013 in preparation for the State of Florida's takeover of the park in October that year. All of the animals have been sold, and most of the structures on the island will be torn down, including the Fort King River Cruise (formerly Jungle Cruise) dock and the show amphitheater, according to the Ocala Star-Banner.

In late 2016 Ross Allen Island was reopened to the public. Most of the former buildings were demolished, including Billy Bowlegs' Cafe, the gift shop and all of the animal enclosures. All of the original boardwalks were removed and the area was left to return to its natural state. A new, smaller boardwalk loop was constructed to allow visitors to view the area. The only remaining structures are the former Jungle Cruise dock (converted into a pavilion) and one of the amphitheaters.

=== Twin Oaks Mansion area ===
Located between the glass-bottom boat dock and the World of Bears area, attractions here have included the Twin Oaks Mansion, built in 1997–1998 in antebellum style; Kiddie Korral, Giraffe exhibit, and the Silver River Showcase Theater. All have been closed.

Twin Oaks Mansion was solely used for the Silver Springs annual Concert Series. Giraffes held in the park were moved to this exhibit during the 1997-98 expansion. The Silver River Showcase Theater is an outdoor "theater" which hosted the Wings of the Springs show.

=== World of Bears ===
The World of Bears area was mainly constructed during the 1997-98 expansion of Silver Springs. In that area were the World of Bears, Wilderness Trail ride, a gift shop, Kids Ahoy! Playland, the carousel, and the former location of the Lost River Voyage boat ride. During the 2013 state takeover of the park, the entire area was shut down. The facilities and exhibit have since been demolished.

== Rides and Activities ==
=== Former Rides and Activities ===
==== Carousel ====
Located near "Kids Ahoy! Playland" and "Kritter Korral", the 40-passenger carousel featured endangered animal figures.

==== Lighthouse Ride ====
Located near the headwaters of the Silver River, the Lighthouse Ride combined the features of a carousel and a gondola ride. Passengers rose up to 80 feet above ground to get a panoramic view of the Silver River and the land around it. It was deconstructed in 2013 before the state took over operations in October.

==== Wilderness Trail Ride ====
The Wilderness Trail Ride, formerly the Jeep Safari, was a Jeep ride where guests were taken through a 35-acre section of forest surrounding the park to see many of the native species of animals and more of Silver Springs history (such as Rhesus Monkeys and Tarzan's house from the original Tarzan movies filmed in the 1930s).

=== Activities ===
==== "Wings of the Springs" Show ====
The "Wings of the Springs" show was located in the outdoor Silver River Showcase Theater, near the Giraffe exhibit. It showcased many birds from around the world. Some of those birds included Parrots, Ducks, Raptors (Eagles, Hawks, Owls, etc.), and other birds.

=== Other ===
==== Kids Ahoy! Playland ====
This playland allowed kids to climb ropes, use slides, crawl through tubes, and more. A small ride had miniature motorboats.

=== Current Rides And Activities ===
==== Glass Bottom Boat Tours ====
Silver Springs' world-renowned glass bottom boats take guests on tours of the Silver River, which has its head waters within the park. From the boats guests can observe many of the river's springs and wildlife.

==== Self-guided Tours ====
Visitors to Silver Springs can now launch kayaks and canoes at the park. A designated paddle trail has been established on the Fort King Waterway which was once used by the Jungle Cruise. Kayaks are also available for rent through a vendor.

The former Jeep Safari route has been opened to the public as a walking trail. It is labeled as the "Creek Trail" on the park's new maps.

== Animal exhibits ==
These are all of the former animal exhibits at Silver Springs. They were shut down in 2013 to make way for the state's takeover of the park.

=== Big Gator Lagoon ===
Big Gator Lagoon is a multiple-acre exhibit that housed over 20 American alligators at its time of closure in 2013. It maintained a swamp look to coincide with the alligators' natural habitat. It was constructed during the 1997-98 expansion of Silver Springs, and was closed with Ross Allen Island in March 2013.

=== "Florida Natives" exhibit ===
The Florida Natives exhibit was opened to the public on January 14, 2000. It featured animals and reptiles native to Florida, including otters, many types of snakes, and other reptiles. The otter exhibit was closed in 2012. The entire exhibit was closed and animals relocated in March 2013.

=== Giraffe exhibit ===
The Giraffe exhibit in Silver Springs dates back to the early 1980s, and is likely even older than that. The current exhibit is a large roped area with a barn for the giraffes in the center of it. It isn't actually "closed", but it is empty since "Khama", the last Giraffe at Silver Springs, died on December 19, 2012.

=== Panther Prowl ===
Panther Prowl, was built during the 1997-98 expansion of Silver Springs. It was accessible from Ross Allen Island; as of March 2013, when it was closed, it housed one Florida Panther and two Western Cougars.

=== World of Bears ===
World of Bears was the bear exhibit at Silver Springs. It housed three Kodiak bears and five Black bears when it closed in May 2013. When it was built in 1997, it housed many species of bears, such as Black bears, Kodiak bears, Spectacled bears, and even a Polar bear in the winter. Its last day of operation was on May 23, 2013.

== Rides, exhibits and activities ==
These rides and exhibits are listed in the order they were closed.

=== Silver Springs Reptile Institute ===
Founded by Ross Allen in 1929, the Silver Springs Reptile Institute (more commonly known as the Ross Allen Reptile Institute) was a site for research as well as exhibit. Allen developed many snake anti-venoms, including dried anti-venom. He also imported venoms for medical and biochemical purposes.

Originally located near the current entrance to the park, the institute was demolished and moved to the Cypress Island in the 1970s. It was enlarged on 1974 to include three amphitheaters for animal shows. The park operators used the premises until 2013 for less dangerous animal shows and animal exhibits; they exhibited diverse crocodile and similar species.

=== "A Touch of Garlits" ===
Opened in 1994, this museum featured antique cars and race cars. It was a branch of the Don Garlits Museum of Drag Racing, located nearby in Ocala.

=== Lost River Voyage ===
Opened in 1991, this boat tour started where the television series Sea Hunt was filmed and continued one mile down the Silver River. It was closed in 2011.

==== "Reptiles of the World" Show ====
Located on Ross Allen Island, this exhibit featured Alligators, Crocodiles and Turtles. It was located in one of the three wooden amphitheaters built in the 1970s for the Silver Springs Reptile Institute. It was closed in March 2013 along with the rest of Ross Allen Island.

==== Non-Venomous Snake Show ====
This show featured non-venomous snakes and gave visitors a chance to interact with and learn about many such species from around the world. Visitors were also taught about the snakes' place in the local environment. Located in one of the three amphitheaters on Ross Allen Island, it closed in March 2013.

==== Fort King River Cruise ====
This tour carried visitors up the Fort King Waterway. On that voyage, historical scenes and exhibits from Silver Spring's past are featured, including replicas of a Seminole Indian village, 1830s Fort King Army stockade, and a pioneer "Cracker" homestead. In the 2000s, park operators started removing non-native animals from attractions and refocused on the regional environment and history. It was closed in March 2013 along with the rest of Ross Allen Island.

== In popular culture ==
Silver Springs, their glass-bottom boats, and the surrounding town of Ocala are all mentioned in the song "Glass Bottom Blues" by Las Vegas singer-songwriter Russell Christian.

== See also ==
- Paradise Park
- Kenneth Althaus, Brigadier general during World War II and Superintendent of Silver Spring 1951-1961
