= Six Gun Territory =

Former Western-themed amusement park in Silver Springs, Florida

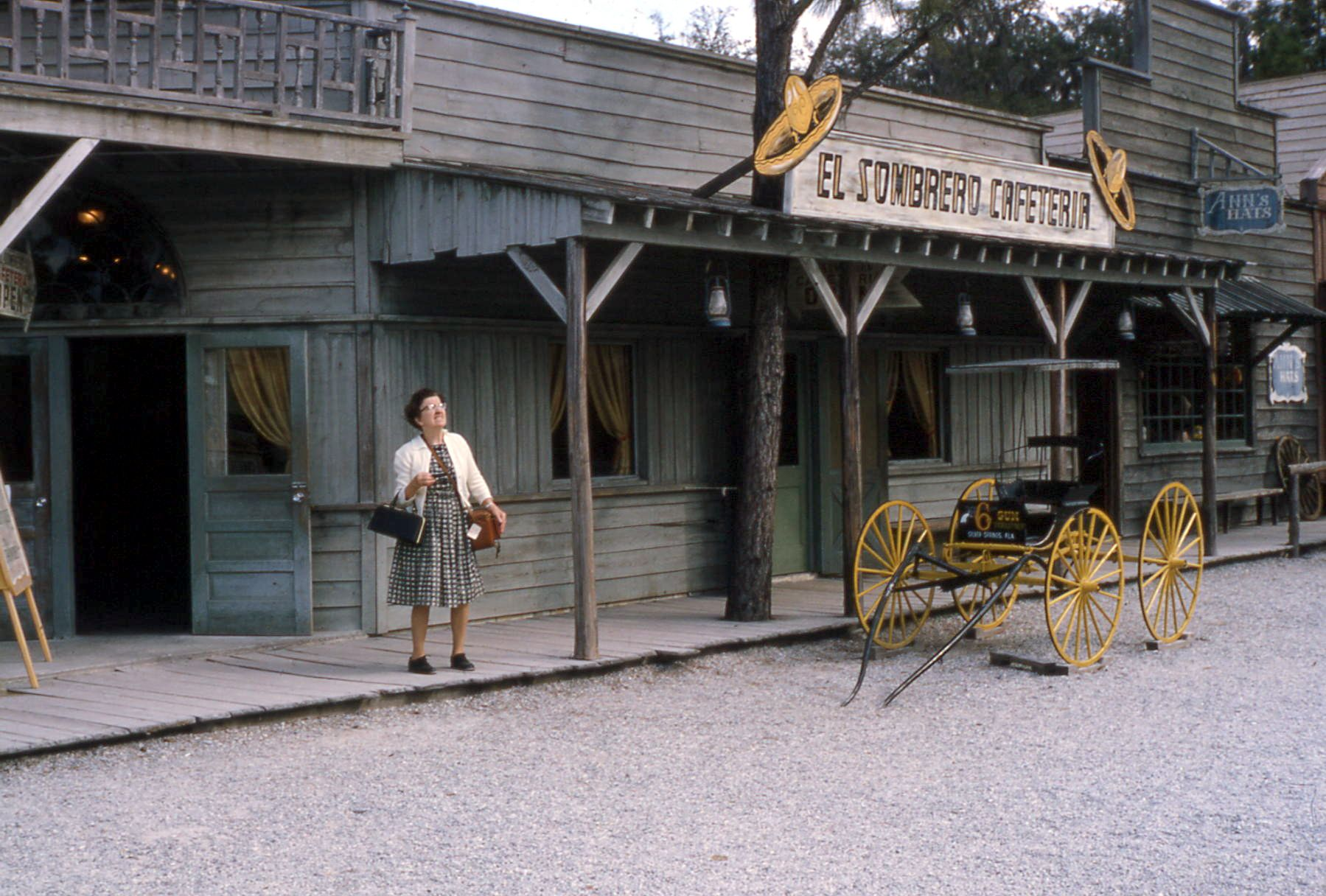
- Interactive map of Six Gun Territory
- Location: Ocala, Florida, United States
- Coordinates: 29.209852°N 82.068949°W
- Status: Defunct
- Opened: February 2, 1963
- Closed: January 1, 1984

Six Gun Territory was a Western-themed theme park in Ocala, Florida, United States. It opened on February 2, 1963 and closed on January 1, 1984.

== Southern Railway & Six Gun ==
One of the principal attractions in Six Gun Territory was the Southern Railway & Six Gun, a narrow gauge heritage railroad. The railroad's former train station, as of July 2016, is located at Kirby Family Farm in Williston, Florida, which has its own narrow gauge train attraction and hosts the Six Gun Territory Wild West Weekend and Reunion event each year.

The railroad utilized two steam locomotives, with details listed in the table below.

Number	Image	Wheel arrangement	Builder	Notes
4		4-4-0	Crown Metal Products	Bought by the Historic Jefferson Railway along with no. 7 following Six Gun's closure. Retained by the railroad as a parts source for no. 7 until sold to Warner Bros., who placed it on display at the entrance to the Underground Atlanta attraction in Atlanta, Georgia. Sold to the Kirby Family Farm in Williston, Florida in 2017, where currently displayed.
7		4-4-0	Crown Metal Products	Operated on the Historic Jefferson Railway in Jefferson, Texas, after Six Gun's closure until 2019. Sold to Kirby Family Farm the following year.

== See also ==
- Ghost Town Village
- New Life Ranch Frontier Cove
- Silver Springs (attraction)
- Wild Waters
