= Jefferson Ordnance Magazine =

- U.S. National Register of Historic Places
- Recorded Texas Historic Landmark
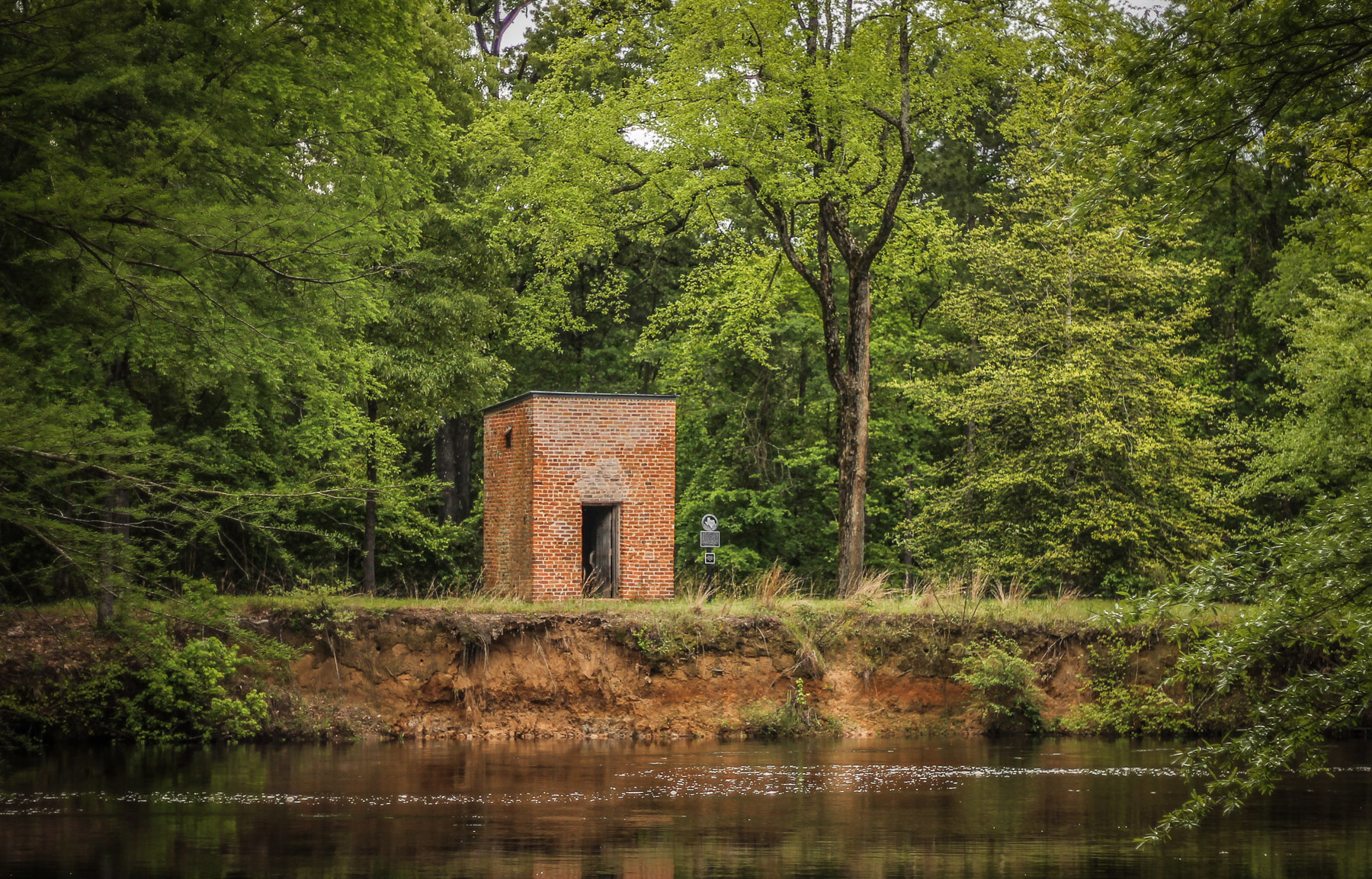
- Jefferson Ordnance Magazine in 2015

- Location within Texas Location within the United States
- Nearest city: Jefferson, Texas
- Coordinates: 32°45′29″N 94°20′18″W
- Area: less than one acre
- Built: 1863
- Architectural style: Military powder magazine
- NRHP reference No.: 95000102
- RTHL No.: 16909

Significant dates
- Added to NRHP: February 17, 1995
- Designated RTHL: 2011

The Jefferson Ordnance Magazine in Jefferson, Texas, United States, is located 0.3 miles northeast of the US-59B crossing of Big Cypress Bayou. It was listed on the National Register of Historic Places in 1995.

It is located across the Big Cypress Bayou waterway from Jefferson and Cypress Bayou Railway. It is claimed by the railway operators and tour guides to be the only remaining Confederate powder magazine from the 1860s. That claim, appearing at this website advertising a train tour, appears to be false, as it does not take into account powder magazines that are included in surviving confederate forts. A specific counter-example to the claim is the Confederate Powderworks, in Georgia, whose powder magazines disprove the claim. A narrower claim, that it is the only surviving Confederate powder house in Texas and one of few in the U.S., is stated by the Historic Jefferson Foundation. An even more narrow claim, that it is "the most intact example in East Texas of a Civil War era brick ordnance magazine directly associated with the Trans-Mississippi Department of the Confederate States of America," appears in a planning document prepared by the Texas Historical Commission.

The magazine was built in late 1863 or early 1864. "Ninety percent of the building is original and remains unaltered except for some weathering, aging brick and some sympathetic repairs." However, two smaller associated buildings have been dismantled, apparently for their bricks.

The Ordnance Magazine and the property it sits on is owned by the Historic Jefferson Foundation. This property is landlocked and the road to the magazine is on private property, today it can only be viewed by riding the Jefferson and Cypress Bayou Railway, or taking the Turning Basin Riverboat Tour, both of which are attractions in Jefferson, Texas.

== See also ==
- National Register of Historic Places listings in Marion County, Texas
- Recorded Texas Historic Landmarks in Marion County
