= Silver River (Florida) =

River in the United States of America

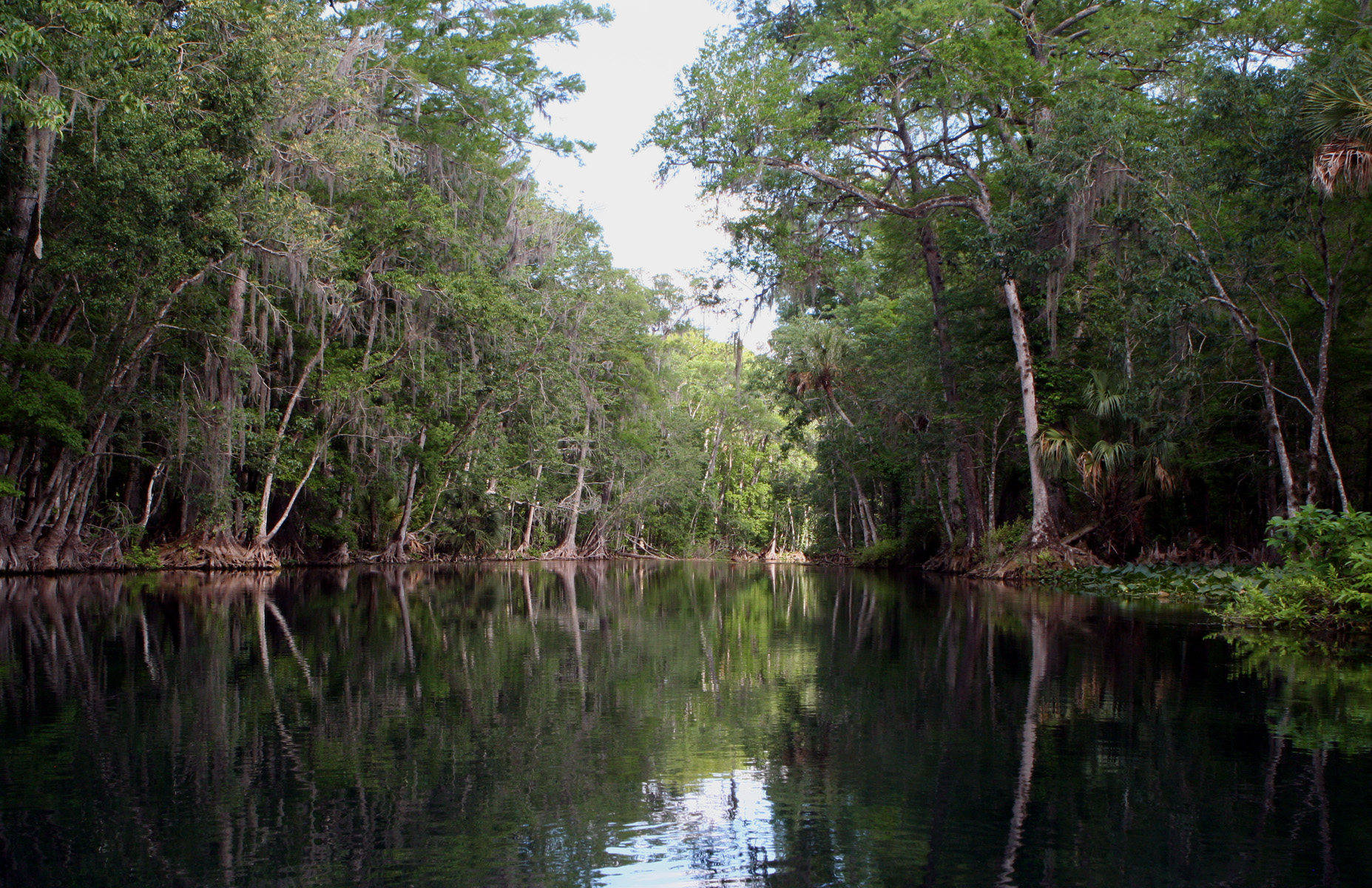

Location
- Country: United States
- State: Florida
- County: Marion
- District: SJRWMD

Physical characteristics
- Source: Silver Springs
  - location: Silver Springs, Florida
  - coordinates: 29°12′57″N 82°03′10″W
- Mouth: Ocklawaha River
  - location: Delks Bluff, Florida
  - coordinates: 29°12′45″N 81°59′17″W
- Length: 4.5 mi (7.2 km)

The Silver River is a short spring-fed river located east of Ocala in Marion County, Florida. Fed by Silver Springs, it connects the springs to the Ocklawaha River, passing through a pristine woodland environment. The river was probably named for its silvery appearance.

== Geography and hydrology ==
The Silver River drains Silver Springs, located in the Silver Springs State Park in Silver Springs, Florida approximately 6 miles (9.7 km) east of Ocala, Florida. The river flows east from the springs, being joined by an unnamed tributary creek from the north just east of the park, for approximately 5.4 miles (8.7 km) before joining the Ocklawaha River just south of the Bert Dosh Memorial Bridge.

== Ecology ==
The Silver River flows through an undeveloped woodland just to the west of the Ocala National Forest; the water quality is considered excellent, and the river is regarded as being in pristine condition.

Many types of turtles are found in the Silver River, while ospreys and anhingas breed along its banks. Rhesus monkeys were released at Silver Springs in the 1930s, and became feral; they remain present along the river's run and can be seen when traveling the river. The Silver River is designated under the Outstanding Florida Waters program.

== History and recreation ==
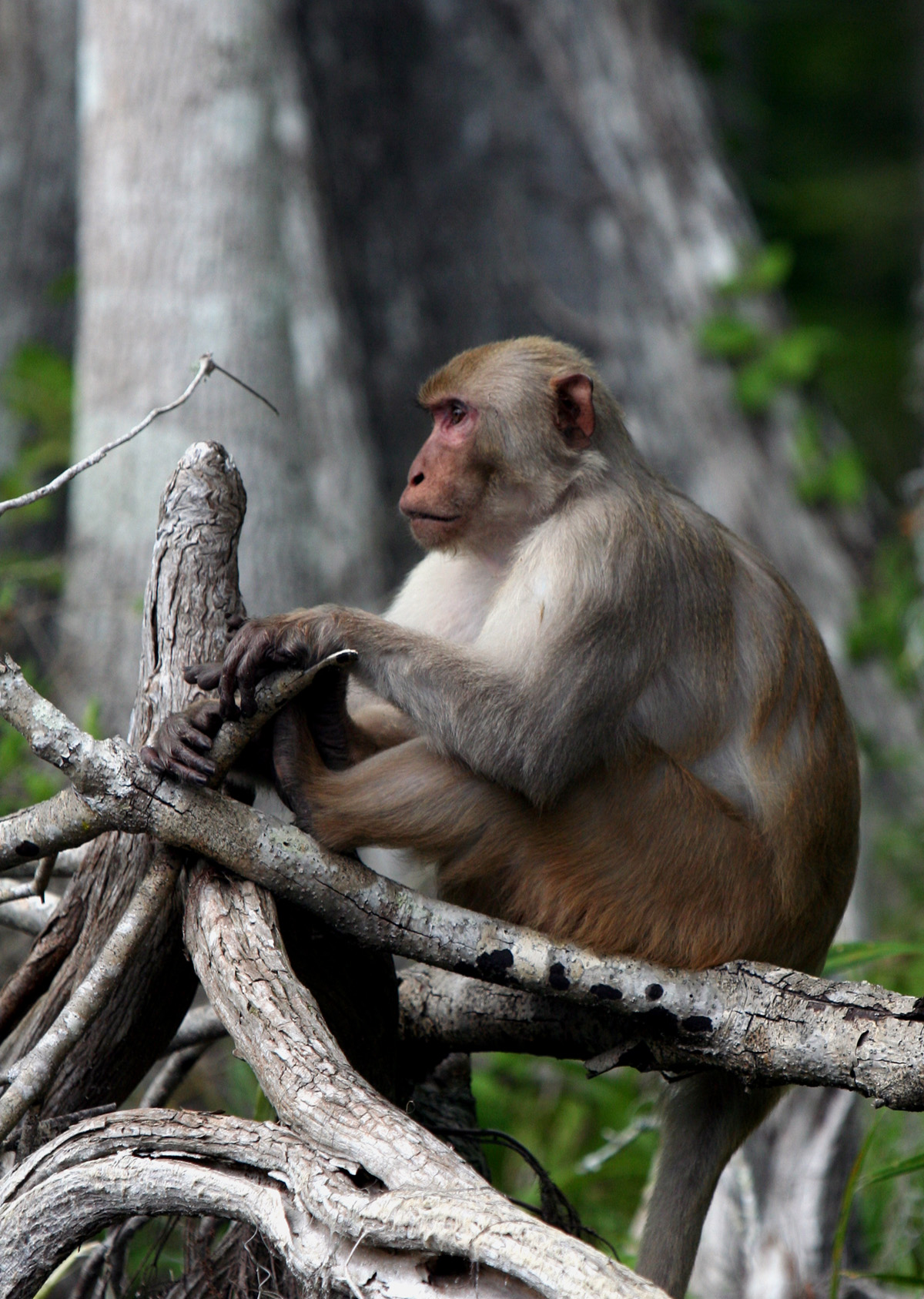
A feral rhesus macaque along Silver River.

The first known human settlement in the Silver River area was by the Timucua people; Europeans arrived in the 1820s, with Fort King being established near the Silver Springs in 1827. The springs became a tourist attraction in the 1870s; the first glass-bottom boat was built to provide views of the springs in 1878. The river steamer Metamora sank near the Silver River's mouth in 1903.

The parks around the river's source, Silver Springs State Park and the historic Silver Springs attraction, are noted tourist destinations; the river is considered to be excellent for exploration by canoe and kayak.

== Bibliography ==
Boning, Charles R. (2007). Florida's Rivers. Sarasota, FL: Pineapple Press. ISBN 978-1-56164-400-1.
