= Ross Allen (herpetologist) =

American herpetologist and writer (1908–1981)

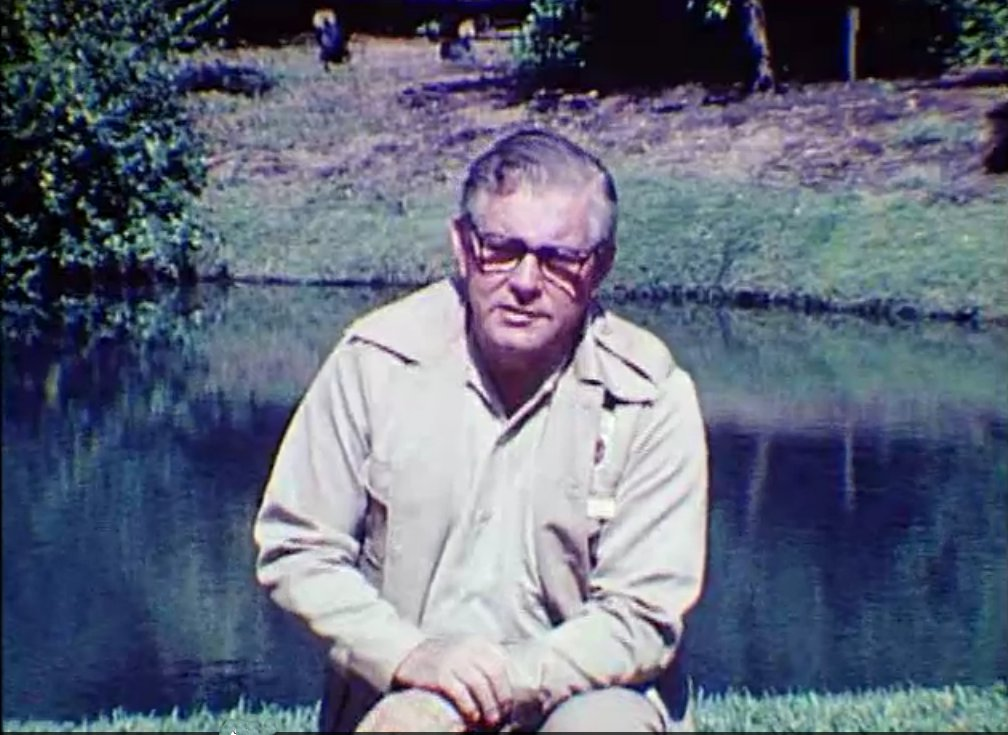
- Born: January 2, 1908; Pittsburgh, Pennsylvania
- Died: May 17, 1981 (aged 73); Gainesville, Florida
- Occupations: Herpetologist; Naturalist; Zoologist
- Children: Carl Tom Allen, John William Allen, Robert Ross Allen, Betty Allen (Bashaw)

Ensil Ross Allen (January 2, 1908 – May 17, 1981) was an American herpetologist and writer who was based in Silver Springs, Florida for 46 years, where he established the Reptile Institute. He used it for research and education about alligators, crocodiles and snakes, also sponsoring and conducting collection expeditions.

Allen founded and was first president of the International Crocodile Society. In his research with snakes, he developed many anti-venoms, including a dried form, and professionally milked venoms for venomous snakes, which was particularly important for protecting United States forces during World War II. He mixed entertainment and science at his Institute.

== Early life and education ==
Ensil Ross Allen, called Ross, was born in Pittsburgh, Pennsylvania in 1908 and attended local schools. He moved as a teenager with his family to Florida. As a young man, Allen made a hobby of capturing turtles, snakes and other reptiles near his home in central Florida. He continued his work and study of them and became noted as an expert herpetologist.

== Career ==
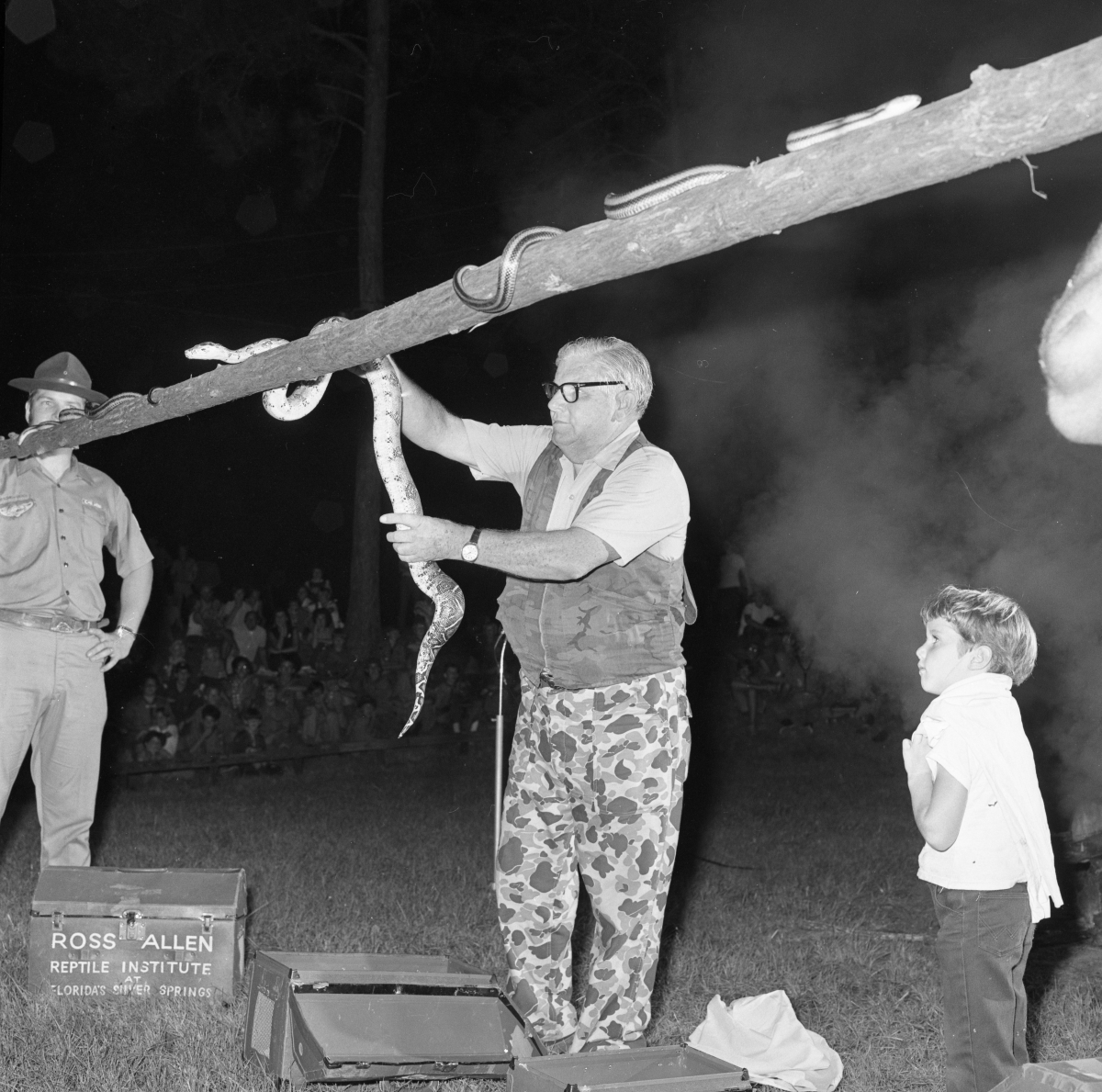
Ross Allen delivering a wildlife demonstration with snakes during Boy Scout Camporee in Silver Springs in 1973.

In November 1929, Allen founded the Reptile Institute at the tourist attraction of Silver Springs, Florida. He developed it into a 10-acre center for research, as well as of entertainment, staging reptile demonstrations, including alligator wrestling and rattlesnake milking. His larger goal was education of the public about reptiles.

The institute has been recognized for his research on native Floridian reptiles. He studied and developed anti-venom solutions, including dried powders. This was particularly important during World War II, when he helped procure anti-venom to protect US troops. Allen often collected specimens for the Institute himself, often with the help of close friend Newton ("Newt") Perry, an accomplished swimmer who helped develop several Florida attractions and who also doubled for Johnny Weissmuller in Tarzan movies' swimming and alligator wrestling scenes. The Institute also featured a large Bengal tiger, several species of monkey and ape, lemurs, exotic birds and hundreds of free-roaming peacocks, including several albinos. Along with the Ross Allen Reptile Institute, there were several other shops and stores, including the famous striped awning "beach cabanas" which could be rented while swimming at the Springs, and the Bath House, which sold Esther Williams bathing suits among other things and was visited by Ms. Williams several times, run by Bobbe Arnst, who was Johnny Weismueller's ("Tarzan") first wife. Other nearby attractions were the Prince of Peace exhibit, a series of dioramas depicting the life of Jesus and Tommy Bartlett's Deer Ranch, where you could interact with several species of deer.

Allen was the founder and first president of the International Crocodile Society. Because of his experience in handling animals, Allen was featured in numerous film shorts and newsreel clips, including the Ted Husing-narrated Catching Trouble (1936), which gained later notoriety from its inclusion in a 1991 episode of the television comedy series Mystery Science Theater 3000, where he is shown chasing, tackling, and dragging bear cubs away for shipment to zoo exhibits in Chicago. He also served as stuntman and reptile handler on several movies that were filmed in Silver Springs, including Tarzan Finds a Son! (1939) and The Yearling (1946). Several television shows were also filmed at Silver Springs, most notably Sea Hunt and I Spy.

Allen sold the institute to ABC-Paramount in 1962, but continued as director until early 1975. The Silver Springs Reptile Institute (more commonly known as the Ross Allen Reptile Institute) was a site for research as well as exhibits. Allen developed many snake anti-venoms, including dried anti-venom. He also imported venoms for medical and biochemical purposes. Allen was also very active in teaching survival techniques to Boy Scouts, and often led expeditions into the forests to teach them about native animals and plants.

Allen was bitten by rattlesnakes so severely on several occasions during antivenin milking sessions that he claimed he developed his own anti-venom over time. The thumb on Allen's left hand was severely deformed because of the snake bites. Because of this, he often hid his left hand in photos. He kept graphic photographs of the healing of his own hand on display at the institute as a warning to children and adults about the severity of venomous snake bites.

He worked at Silver Springs for a total of 46 years, leaving in 1975. He moved to the St. Augustine Alligator Farm for several years, then began work on a new attraction near Lake City that was to be called Alligator Town, U.S.A. After his death in 1981, however, the project was abandoned.

== Personal life ==
Ross and his first wife Virginia (married 1934, divorced 1949) had children named John, Robert, Tom and Betty. Later Allen married Celeste (divorced 1958), who sometimes joined him in collecting expeditions, having learned how to handle snakes. Ross's fourth wife, Jeanette (married 1977), bore him three sons, Kenneth, Craig, and Sidney.

== Legacy and honors ==
- 2000, Cypress Island at Silver Springs was renamed Ross Allen Island in his honor. For environmental stewardship, after Silver Springs became a state park the island exhibit was removed and replaced with a boardwalk through a natural swamp in his honor. Displays at Silver Springs and The Silver River Museum have displays telling the story of Ross Allen's life and accomplishments.

== Selected list of works ==
- Florida Water Snakes (1941)
- Fishes of Silver Springs, Florida (1946)
- Keep Them Alive (1960)
- How to Keep Snakes in Captivity (1971)
