= Glass-bottom boat =

Surface vessel with underwater windows

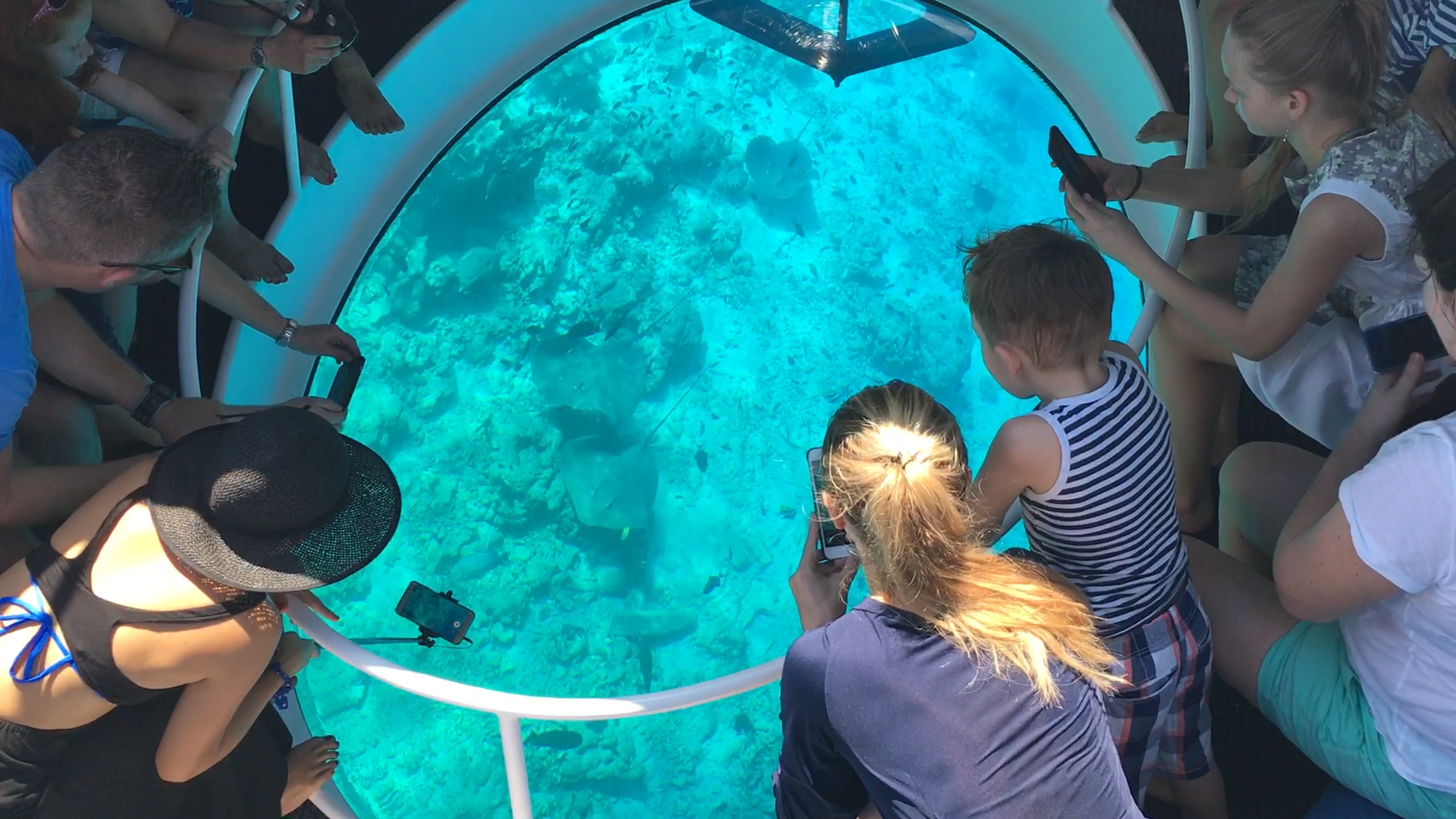
Panoramic bottom glass of the boat Looker 370

A glass-bottom boat is a boat with sections of glass, panoramic bottom glass or other suitable transparent material, below the waterline allowing passengers to observe the underwater environment from within the boat. The view through the glass bottom is better than simply looking into the water from above, because one does not have to look through optically erratic surface disturbances. The effect is similar to that achieved by a diving mask, while the passengers are able to stay dry and out of the water.

== Use ==
Glass-bottom boats are used for giving tours, as they are usually designed to allow the maximum number of tourists to view out the glass bottom.

Glass-bottom boats are in use in many seaside tourist destinations as well as lake towns.

Typical tours in these boats include views of underwater flora and fauna, reefs, shipwrecks, and other underwater sights.

== History ==
The glass-bottom boat was invented in 1878 by two men, Hullam Jones and Philip Morrell, in Marion County, Florida. Jones outfitted a dugout canoe with a glass viewing box at the bottom, which allowed tourists to view the clear waters of Silver Springs, Florida. Eventually, the spring was purchased by Col. W.M. Davidson and Carl Ray, who developed a gasoline-powered glass-bottom boat in 1924.

== Gallery ==
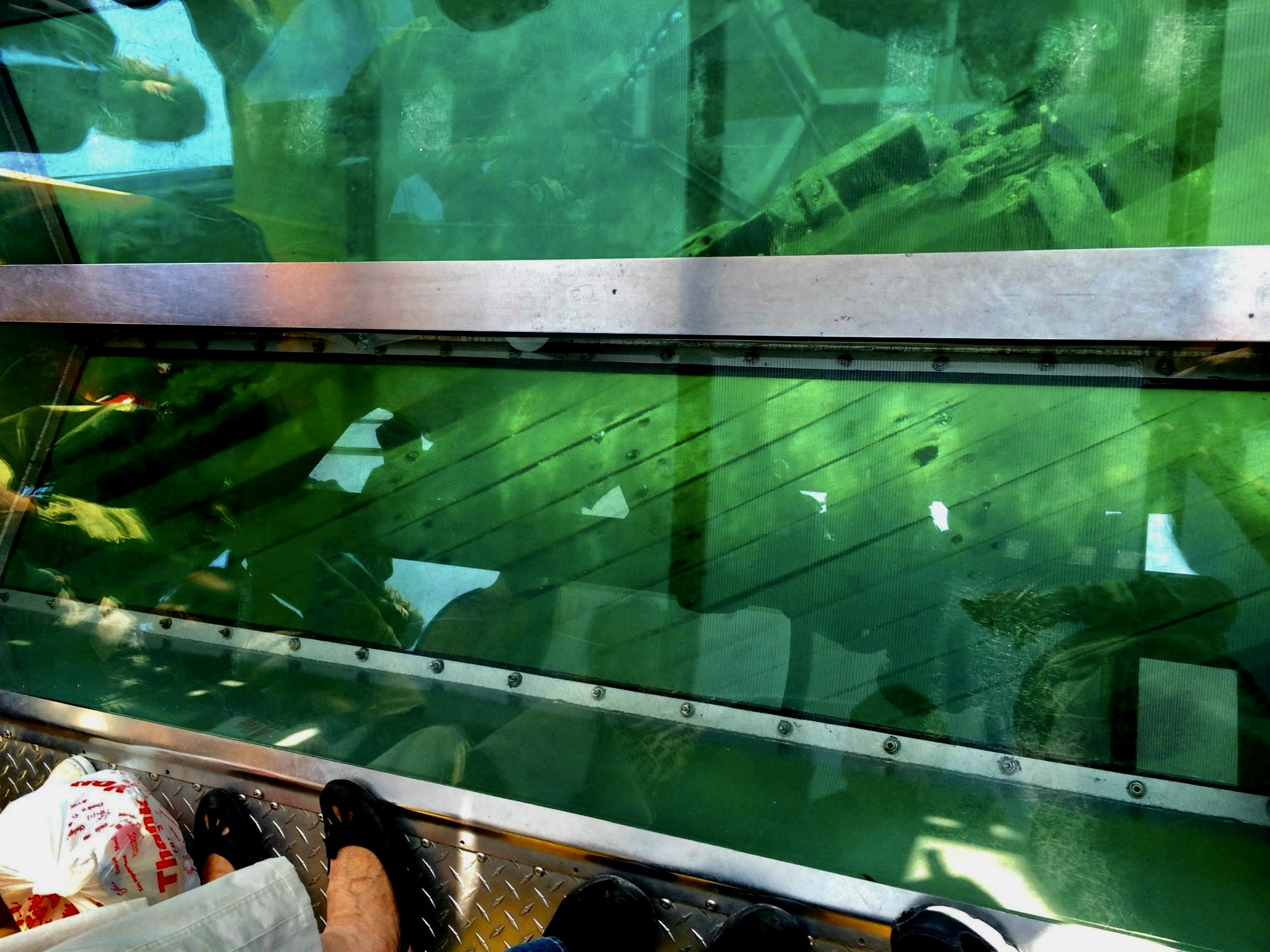
View of a shipwreck in Tobermory, Ontario, Canada

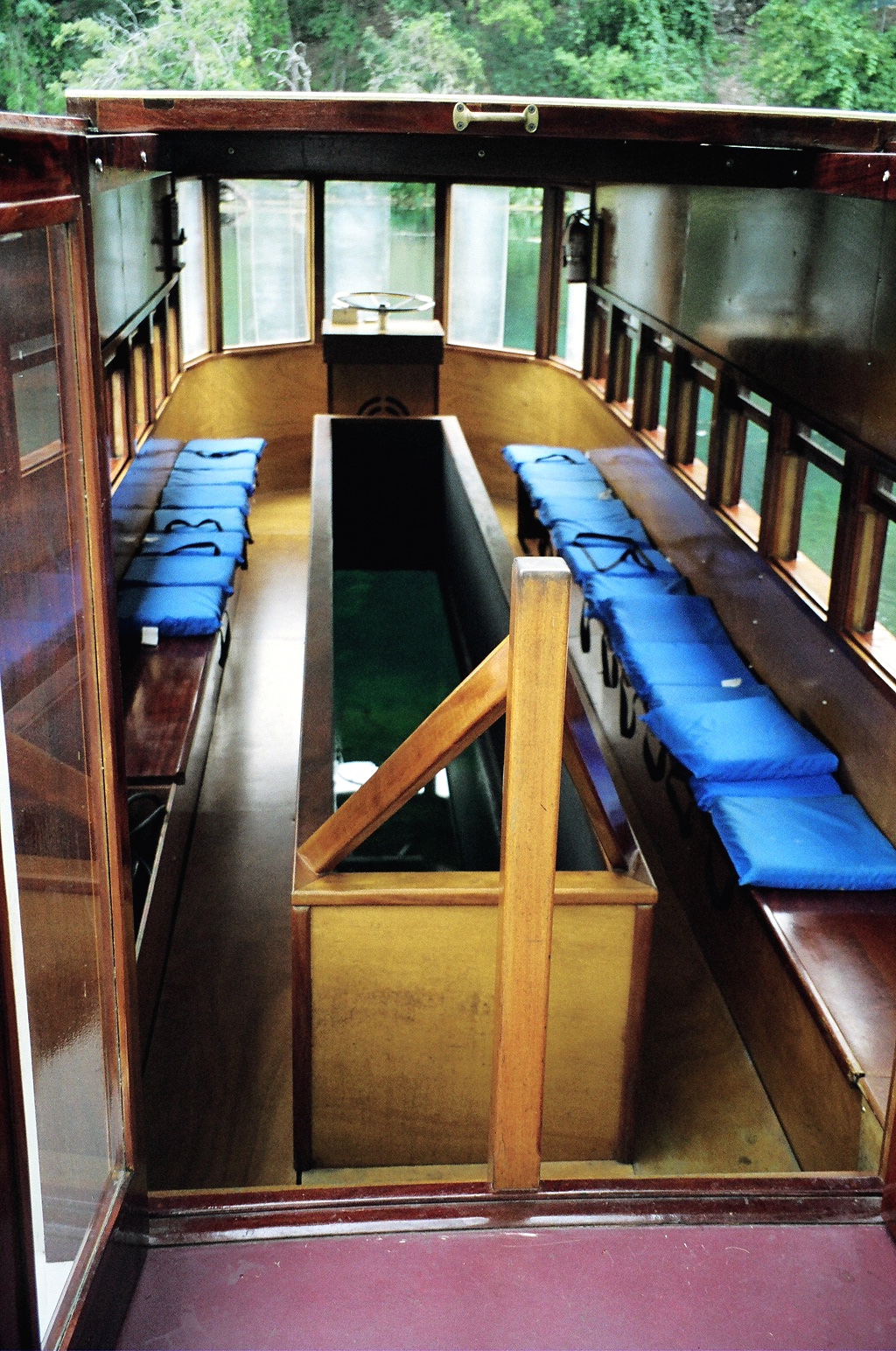
The interior of a glass-bottom boat

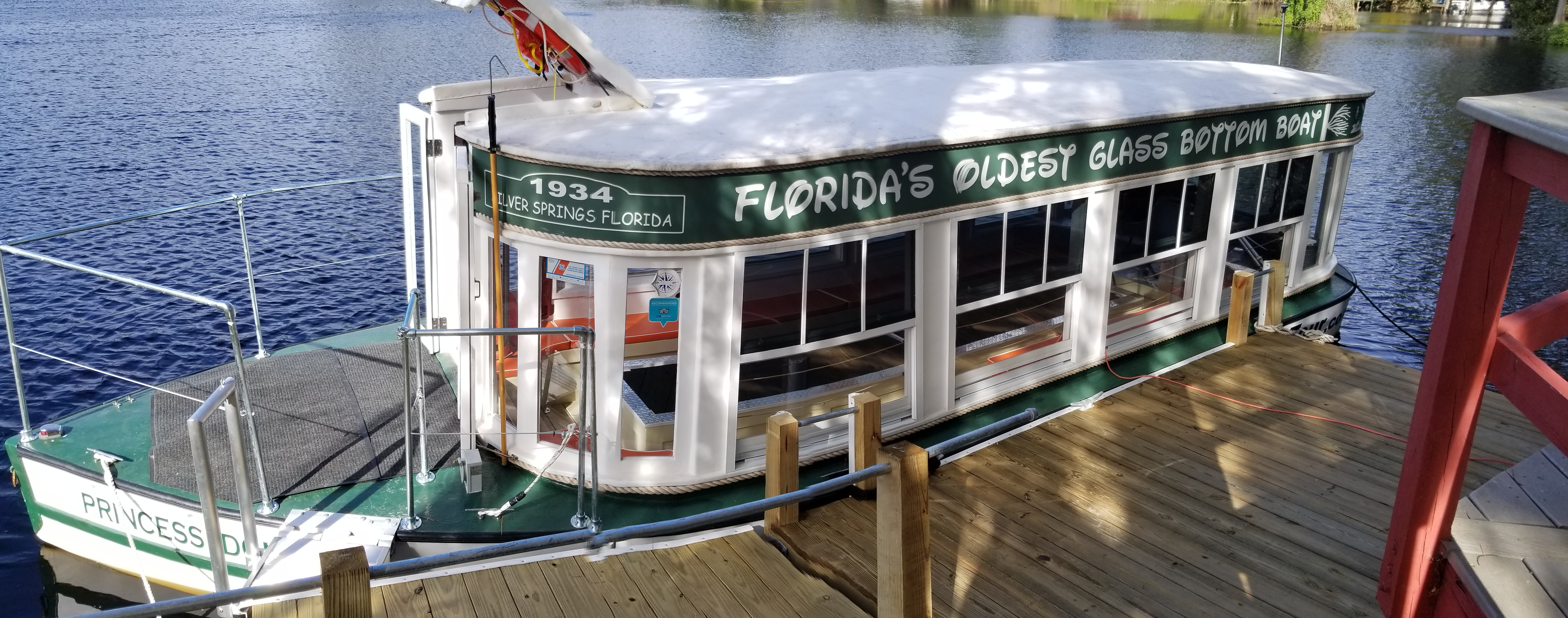
The oldest operational glass-bottom boat in Florida

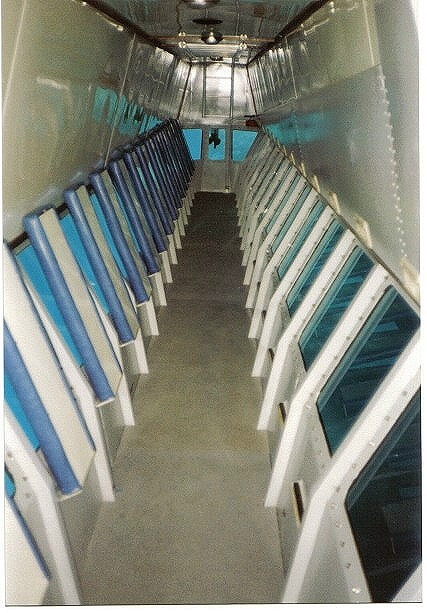
Undersea windows on the Great Barrier Reef

== See also ==
- AquaDom
