= EMSA =

EMSA may stand for:

== Acronyms ==
- Egyptian Medical Students' Association
- Electron Microscopy Society of America former name of the Microscopy Society of America
- Electrophoretic mobility shift assay
- Emergency Medical Services Alliance, in Marion County, Florida, United States
- Emergency Medical Services Authority, In Oklahoma City and Tulsa, OK
- Emsa (company), manufacturer from Germany
- Encoding Method for Signature Appendix, a method used in RSA cryptographic signing in PKCS #1
- European Magnetic Sensors and Actuators
- European Maritime Safety Agency
- European Masters Sports Association, the organization responsible for bidding and placing athletic competitions
- European Medical Students' Association, in Brussels, Belgium
- European Multiple System Atrophy study group

== Location ==
- Emsa: a small archaeological site near Tetouan, Morocco
