= List of Carnegie libraries in Florida =

The following list of Carnegie libraries in Florida provides detailed information on United States Carnegie libraries in Florida, where 10 public libraries were built from 10 grants (totaling $198,000) awarded by the Carnegie Corporation of New York from 1901 to 1917. In addition, academic libraries were built at 4 institutions (totaling $76,500).

== Key ==
Building still operating as a library
Building standing, but serves another purpose
Building no longer standing
Building listed on the National Register of Historic Places
Building contributes to a historic district on the National Register of Historic Places

== Carnegie libraries ==
	Library	City or town	Image	Date granted	Grant amount	Location	Notes
1	Bartow	Bartow		Mar 18, 1911	$8,000	310 E. Stanford	Demolished in 1998
2	Bradenton	Bradenton		Feb 3, 1917	$10,000	1405 4th Ave. W	now houses the Manatee County Historical Records Library.
3	Clearwater	Clearwater		Mar 16, 1915	$10,000	107 Oceola Ave.	Demolished about 2000
4	Gainesville	Gainesville		Mar 31, 1916	$10,000	419 E. University Ave.	Demolished in 1954
5	Jacksonville	Jacksonville		Feb 13, 1902	$55,000	101 E. Adams St.	Since 1984 has been owned and occupied by the Bedell law firm
6	Ocala	Ocala		Feb 21, 1907	$10,000	206 E. Ocklawaha Ave.	Demolished in 1968
7	Palmetto	Palmetto		Jan 14, 1914	$10,000	515 10th Ave. W	Included in the Palmetto Historic District, listed on the National Register of Historic Places
8	St. Petersburg	St. Petersburg		Jul 9, 1913	$17,500	280 5th St. N	
9	Tampa	Tampa		Dec 30, 1901	$50,000	102 E. 7th Ave.	Currently Tampa-Hillsborough County Public Library administrative offices
10	West Tampa	West Tampa		Jan 2, 1913	$17,500	2312 W. Union St.	

== Academic libraries ==
	Institution	Locality	Image	Year granted	Grant amount	Notes
1	Fessenden Academy	Martin		Mar 15, 1905	$6,500	
2	State Normal and Industrial College for Colored Students, later Florida A&M University	Tallahassee		Jul 18, 1905	$10,000	It houses the Southeastern Regional Black Archives Research Center and Museum. Carnegie built his library at the negro college after the city of Tallahassee refused it, because under Carnegie's rules it would have to have served all (i.e., black) patrons.
3	John B. Stetson University	DeLand		Mar 12, 1906	$40,000	Became Sampson Hall
4	Rollins College	Winter Park		Jun 22, 1905	$20,000	

=== Carnegie Hall Library at Rollins College ===
One of the Florida libraries funded by Andrew Carnegie was on the campus of Rollins College in Winter Park. According to Cohen (2006), Carnegie's "donation of 108 libraries to colleges in the first two decades of the twentieth century assisted 10 percent of the institutions of higher learning in the United States. Carnegie had a preference for colleges and universities that served African-American students, which Rollins College president William Fremont Blackman confirmed in a letter to Carnegie appealing for a library in 1904:

The fact that it is the only college in the country, North or South, in which the grandchildren of abolitionists and confederate soldiers, in about equal numbers, sit together in the same class-room and play together on the same athletic field, and learn thus to understand, respect and love one another;

Blackman's request consisted of $35,000 in total: "$20,000 for a fireproof building, $3,000 for books, and $12,000 as an endowment for the continued purchase of books" (Cohen). Blackman received a response from Carnegie's secretary James Bertram that noted the request was too general for consideration, and that Carnegie would need a profile of the university before consideration. Little progress was made for over a year, when Blackman again wrote to Carnegie, noting the university's need for a library. Trustees and friends of the university wrote to Carnegie on Blackman's behalf, including W.W. Cummer, a trustee from Jacksonville who served on the board of the city's new Carnegie Library. A letter dated 22 June 1905 and written from Carnegie's home in Scotland brought the welcome news of the offer of a library. Carnegie offered $20,000 for the construction of a library provided that the same amount would be raised for the library's upkeep. While grateful for Carnegie's proposal, Blackman was uneasy with its terms because the amount of funding required to match Carnegie's offer would put a strain on those who had donated to start the college's endowment fund ($200,000) as well as paid a debt ($30,000). In correspondence to Bertram dated July 11, 1905 Blackman wrote (according to Cohen):

Our college is in the poorest of States, remote from all centers of wealth and population, and our friends have strained themselves to the uttermost, in the effort to raise $230,000 in two years. I am by no means sure that we can meet Mr. Carnegie's conditions.

In a January 1906 letter Blackman wrote to Carnegie expressing concern about meeting the conditions for the gift, noting that the college had a large debt that took "considerable self-sacrifice on the part of our friends." That summer, another Florida college, Stetson University, was awarded $40,000 for a library from Carnegie. Upon learning this Blackman again wrote to Carnegie, seeking to amend the original terms of the agreement to match the amount that Stetson was awarded. He was turned down, but a year later was able to notify Carnegie that the school's trustees had been able to match the $20,000 necessary for the gift to be awarded. Bertram wrote to Blackman to inform him that Carnegie had "authorized his Cashier ... to arrange payments on Library Building, as work progresses, to the extent of Twenty Thousand Dollars." The library, to be named Carnegie Hall, was dedicated on February 18, 1909.

The building had over 8,000 square feet of space, and was the school's first dedicated library building. It served as so from 1909 until 1951. In addition to its function as a library, Carnegie Hall also served as the school's post office. Since the library was moved from Carnegie to the newly built Mills Memorial Library, it has also housed a bookstore, admissions office, faculty offices, and human resources.

=== Carnegie Library at Stetson University ===
Sampson Hall, Stetson University's Carnegie library was opened in 1908. The Carnegie donation was matched with funds donated by John B. Stetson's wife, Elizabeth S. Stetson, and the library later was named Sampson Library in honor of C.T. Sampson, one of the university's foremost trustees. Of the academic libraries that Carnegie helped to fund, Stetson's Sampson library received funds greatly exceeding those received by others in the state. The funding was given on March 12, 1906. Two years later, the resulting Sampson Library was a gorgeous structure which housed the university's library for fifty-six years before a lack of space led to changes. The structure was designed by Henry John Klutho, the first Floridian Architect to be inducted to the American Institute of Architects, and reflects the neoclassical style many Carnegie libraries adopted. The library's edifice is emblazoned with "Education is Power" in Roman style lettering and all around the building are the names of persons influential to academia, such as Chaucer, Tennyson, and Longfellow. When Sampson Library was relocated to the DuPont-Ball Library in 1964, the entire university- students, faculty, and staff- helped to move the books by hand from one building to the other. Students we asked to give an hour of their time to move the resources, but many worked even longer helping to move the materials whose numbers exceed 100,000. Sampson Hall is still used by Stetson University and is a prominent structure along the palm court at the heart of the university. Its space was divided into classrooms and faculty offices used by the Art, modern language, and American Studies departments; and also is home to student art studios. Its place as the library's former home and a building of great architectural importance on campus is still prominent.

== See also ==
- List of libraries in the United States
