= Ocala Carnegie Library =

Coordinates: 29.1871°N 82.1348°W

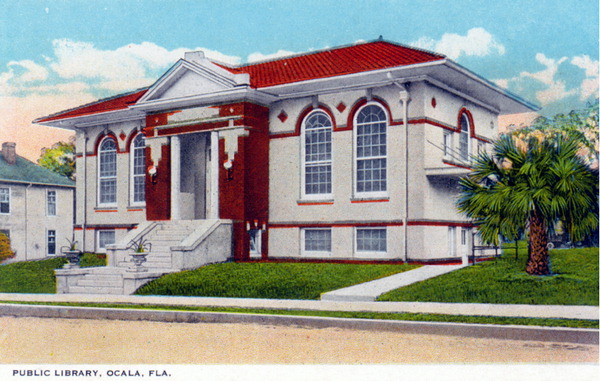
- Carnegie Public Library Ocala, Florida 1916
- Interactive map of the Ocala Carnegie Library area

General information
- Architectural style: Spanish Colonial Revival architecture
- Location: Ocklawaha Avenue in Ocala, Florida
- Opened: 1916
- Demolished: 1968

The Ocala Carnegie Library opened in 1916 on Ocklawaha Avenue in Ocala, Florida, United States. It was one of 10 Florida Carnegie libraries to receive grants awarded by the Carnegie Corporation of New York from 1901 to 1917. Steel magnate and philanthropist Andrew Carnegie provided funding for more than 3,000 Carnegie libraries in the United States, Canada, and Europe.

Constructed in the Spanish Mission architectural style with a red-clay tile roof, Ocala's first public library was a short distance from what is today the Silver Springs Nature Theme Park. Although the Carnegie library was Ocala's first permanent, physical public library, the city's library collection began in 1886. Originally a subscription library, its members paid one dollar for a two-year membership. In 1890, The Women's Library Association assumed responsibility for a public library collection, temporarily housed in the Hotel Ocala. The Ocala Free Public Library officially began as a circulating collection in 1914 even though the Carnegie library did not open until 1916.

On September 11, 1916, at 8 am, the Ocala Carnegie Library opened its doors for the first time. When the library first opened it was not fully furnished yet, but there had been multiple delays along the process of building the library and making it open-ready, and so in order to avoid further delays the library opened while only partially furnished. Likewise, there wasn't an opening ceremony for the building either, according to the local newspaper, the Ocala Evening Star. The Ocala Carnegie Library instituted the latest card indexing system of its time, with at least 17,000 cards already created by its opening day, and more expected to be made by the library's librarian, Louise Gamsby. She was appointed librarian in 1916 and served in that capacity until her retirement in 1951; after retirement, Gamsby continued to serve as a library consultant for many years.

On opening day the library's hours were posted as weekdays only, from 8 am to 10 am and 4 pm to 8 pm. However, Louise Gamsby posted notices in the Ocala Evening Star in October 1916 that the hours had been changed to weekdays only, 9 am to 11 am and 4 pm to 8 pm. This notice reappeared in the Ocala Evening Star multiple times, moving into November as well.

The Ocala Carnegie Library's first floor was devoted to the stacks, with lots of windows to let in natural light, two alcoves with hat and coat racks, and a fireplace. The basement of the building had an assembly hall (with provided speaker's platform), bathrooms, several closets, and a work room for staff. Though, even by 1920, the library only had two members of staff: the librarian Louise Gambsy and her assistant.

The Carnegie Library was demolished in 1968 to make way for a larger, more modern library facility, that would be part of what is now known as the Marion County Public Library System.
