= Teddy bear hospital =

International medical initiative

The Teddy Bear Hospital Project (TBHP) is an international medical initiative organized by the International Federation of Medical Students' Associations (IFMSA) and the European Medical Students' Association (EMSA) that aims to reduce children's fears of medical procedures and staff. It originated in Norway in 2000 and by 2006 had spread to 28 countries. With the support of parents, teachers, and doctors, it is organized and run primarily by medical students.

The underlying strategy and program, outside the IFMSA and EMSA, is called the teddy bear hospital (TBH) and involves mock consultations where medical students role play as a "teddy doctor" to children who act as the carer of a teddy, or another soft toy, requiring consultation. The strategy is used to help reduce children's fears of doctors, hospitals and medical procedures, and provides an opportunity for medical students to better understand children. The strategy is typically used as part of pediatric and pediatric nursing curriculums.

A number of universities and medical facilities run TBH programs worldwide—at approximately 20 medical schools in the UK, eight medical schools in Australia, seven medical schools in Bulgaria, two medical schools in Ireland (including University of Galway and University of Limerick), and Germany, Norway, Singapore, and Israel.

== Method ==
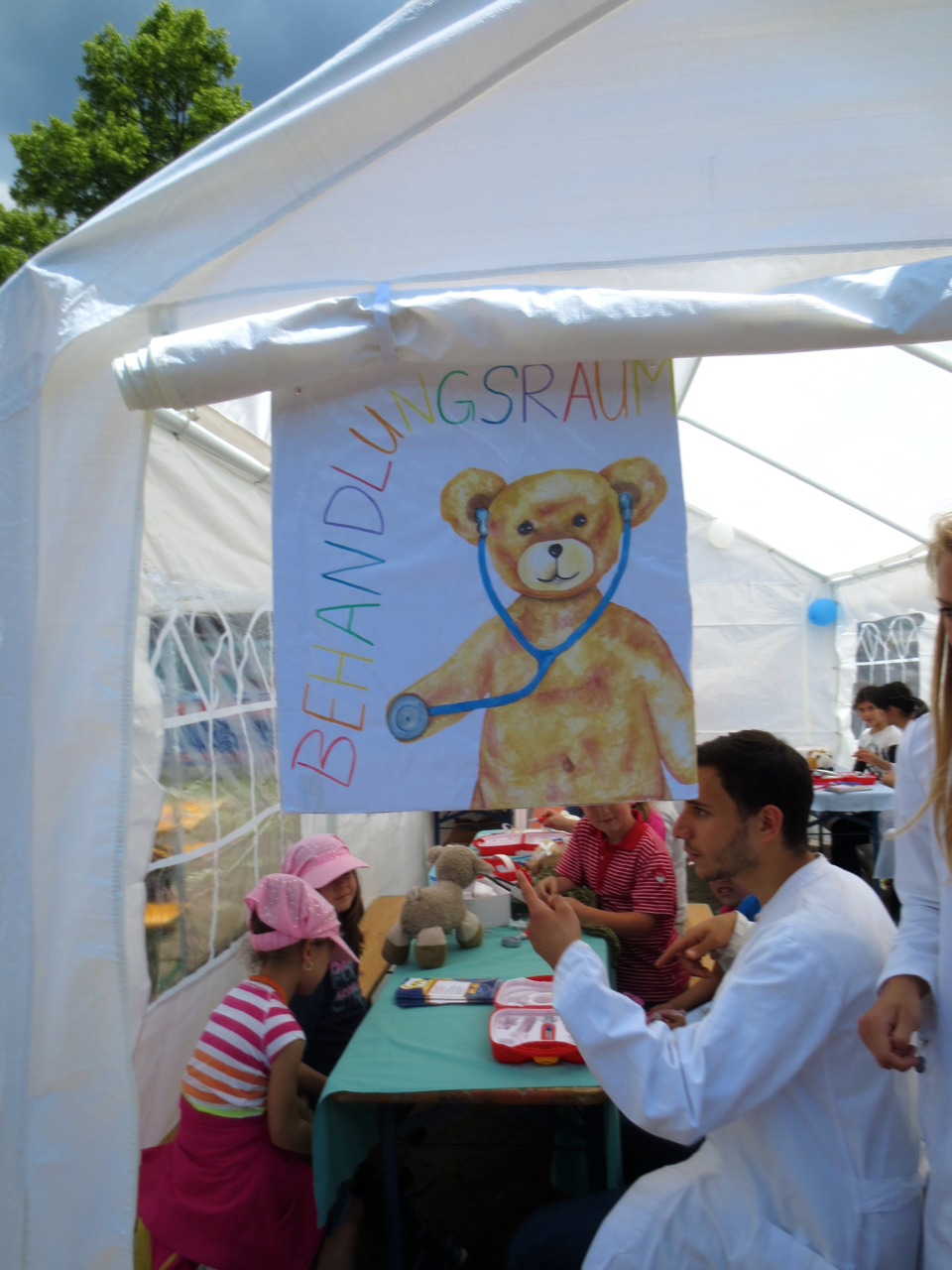
A teddy bear hospital in Heidelberg, Germany.

The first study on TBH was first published in 2008 in Israel. The study examined the effects of the TBH method on preschool children's fear of future hospitalization. Of the 91 children in the experiment, they found the TBH group had to significantly lower levels of anxiety with respect to hospitalization than the control group. Typically conducted on children of ages 2–6, one theory motivating the TBH approach is that these children typically believe inanimate objects like teddy bears have life, known as animism. One theory by Jean Piaget is that this animism can also provide comfort to children.

The method of one 2013 TBH nursery study is as follows: after initially receiving education related to animism, developmental psychology and role play, students are assigned to various nursery schools. As volunteers, the students are responsible for contacting the school to make appointments. Prior to the appointment, students meet the children at the nursery school beforehand to get to know each other. When the children come to the college with their 'sick teddies', they are met with students in a white uniform which perform mock admission and treatment. In the 2008 and 2009 trials, students also kept journals of the encounters later used for reflection and qualitative data analysis. In other studies such as the original 2008 study, the child's emotions are assessed using a simple 1-item facial image scale a day prior to the intervention and again 1 week after the TBH appointment.

== St George's University of London ==
While a number of TBH programs are coordinated within the United Kingdom by Medsin, the TBH program at St George's University of London is run as a separate society. As of 2023, the university had 600 healthcare students volunteering to run TBH at free clinics for local schools and organisations. In addition to fundraising within the hospital and university, SGUL TBH organised a fun run in Hyde Park in May 2010.

Projects run by TBH at St George's, University of London (SGUL) have included talks promoting child health (including an "FGM Talk" undertaken in 2009), fundraising events, puppet shows and TBH clinics. These TBH clinics have been run for schools, Beaver Scout groups, Brownie groups and after-school clubs in South West London since 2009. Aspects of the stations, undertaken during these clinics, complement or cover parts of the KS1/KS2 curriculum, in particular PHSE. Children are asked to bring along a teddy bear to the clinic on which new skills are learnt and practised.

- Bloch, Yuval H.; Toker, Asaf (2008). "Doctor, is my teddy bear okay? The" Teddy Bear Hospital" as a method to reduce children's fear of hospitalization". The Israel Medical Association Journal. 10 (8–9): 597–599. PMID 18847160.
- Husøy, Gjertrud (March 2013). "Teddy Bear Hospital — Students' Learning in the Field of Practice with Children". Nordic Journal of Nursing Research. 33 (1): 51–55. doi:10.1177/010740831303300111. hdl:11250/150782. ISSN 2057-1585. S2CID 145223641.
- Kis, Hannah; Endres, Kaitlin; Karwowska, Anna; Harrison, Megan; Lau, Stephanie; Lemire, Olivia; Zucker, Marc (July 2022). ""Teddy Bear Hospital Project" school visits improve pre-clerkship students' comfort explaining medical concepts to children". Can Med Educ J. 13 (3): 70–74. doi:10.36834/cmej.73167. PMC 9297244. PMID 35875438.
- Kammeyer, Jana (2006-07-01). "Medics worldwide: news and opportunities from the IFMSA". BMJ. 333 (333) 0607268b. doi:10.1136/sbmj.0607268b. S2CID 220109474.
- Kochhar, Suneeta; French, Stephen; Vlad, Ioana (2004-06-01). "Teddy bear hospital". BMJ. 328 (328). doi:10.1136/sbmj.0406248. S2CID 27620251.
- Leonhardt, Corinna; Margraf-Stiksrud, Jutta; Badners, Larissa; Szerencsi, Andrea; Maier, Rolf F (1 July 2013). "Does the 'Teddy Bear Hospital' enhance preschool children's knowledge? A pilot study with a pre/post-case control design in Germany". Journal of Health Psychology. 19 (10): 1250–1260. doi:10.1177/1359105313488975. ISSN 1359-1053. PMID 23818510. S2CID 13564291.
- Nheu, Lilly; Uahwatanasakul, Wonie; Gray, Amy (2018-11-26). "Medical students' experience of a Teddy Bear Hospital as part of a paediatric curriculum". Focus on Health Professional Education: A Multi-Professional Journal. 19 (3): 40. doi:10.11157/fohpe.v19i3.217. ISSN 2204-7662. S2CID 150257931.
- Ong, Lynn; Chua, Khoon Han; Soh, Jian Yi; Aw, Marion Margaret Hui Yong (4 September 2018). "Healthcare encounters in young children: Impact of Teddy Bear Hospital, Singapore". The Asia Pacific Scholar. 3 (3): 24–30. doi:10.29060/taps.2018-3-3/oa1055. ISSN 2424-9335. S2CID 240251491.
- Thambapillai, Sasha (2009-11-20). "Teddy bear hospital: where clinical gets cuddly". BMJ (339) b4912. doi:10.1136/sbmj.b4912. S2CID 155426412.
