= Sholom Park =

Botanical garden in Ocala, Florida, United States

Coordinates: 29.1151°N 82.2552°W

Sholom Park is a non-profit privately owned, 44-acre botanical garden in Ocala, Florida. Opened in 2004, the park features over 2 miles of paved trails and more than 250 species of plants and trees.

The park features include a formal garden walk, rose garden, prairie area, olive trees, azaleas, labyrinth and a pond with koi. It is handicap-accessible.

Sholom Park is named after Sholom, the grandfather of local developer Sidney Colen, who founded the Park as a gift to all people seeking Peace. Sholom/Shalom also means peace in Hebrew.

Areas can be rented for weddings and events.
