= Marion Hotel (Ocala, Florida) =

- U.S. National Register of Historic Places
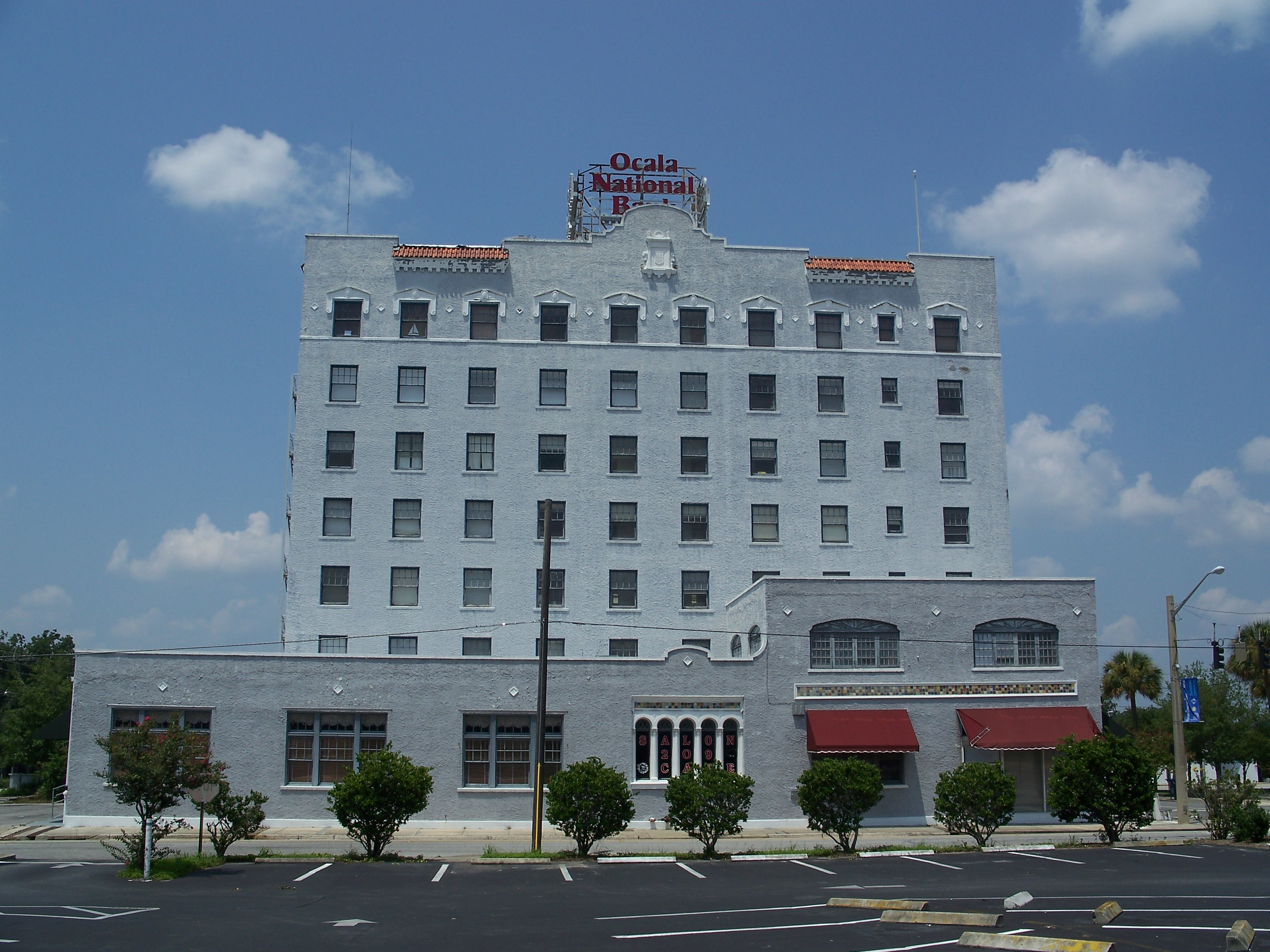

- Location within Florida Location within the United States
- Location: Ocala, Florida
- Coordinates: 29°11′16″N 82°8′14″W
- Built: 1927
- NRHP reference No.: 80000955
- Added to NRHP: October 16, 1980

The Marion Hotel is a historic hotel in Ocala, Florida, United States. It is located at 108 North Magnolia Avenue. On October 16, 1980, it was added to the U.S. National Register of Historic Places. The manager of the hotel in the 1930s was Norton Baskin, a career hotelier originally from Union Springs, Alabama, who had worked in hotels in Atlanta and Valdosta, Georgia, and Lake Worth, Florida, before coming to Ocala in 1933. It was there that he met the author Marjorie Kinnan Rawlings, who was living nearby in the hamlet of Cross Creek. The story of their long courtship is told in the 1983 film Cross Creek, which featured Mary Steenburgen as Rawlings and Peter Coyote as Baskin. While Baskin managed the hotel, famous guests included actor W. C. Fields, novelist Sinclair Lewis, and journalist John Hersey. With money made from her bestselling novel The Yearling, Rawlings was able to invest in a hotel, run by Baskin, in St. Augustine, where the couple moved and married in 1941. In 2022 plans were announced to restore the Marion Hotel building as a boutique hotel, after decades serving as a bank and office building.

== Gallery ==
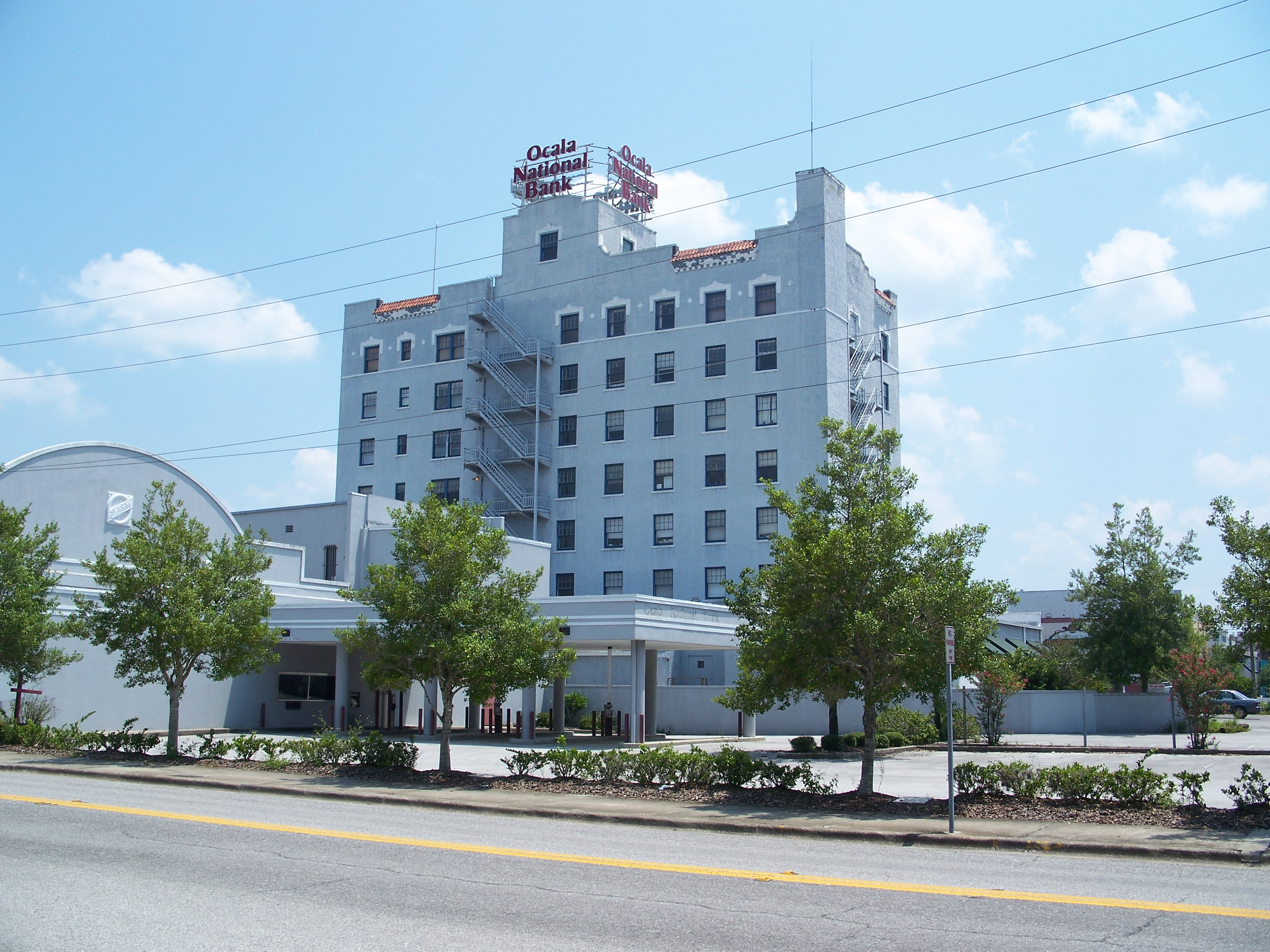
Old entrance to the hotel
