= Ocala Historic District =

Historic district in Florida, United States

- U.S. National Register of Historic Places
- U.S. Historic district
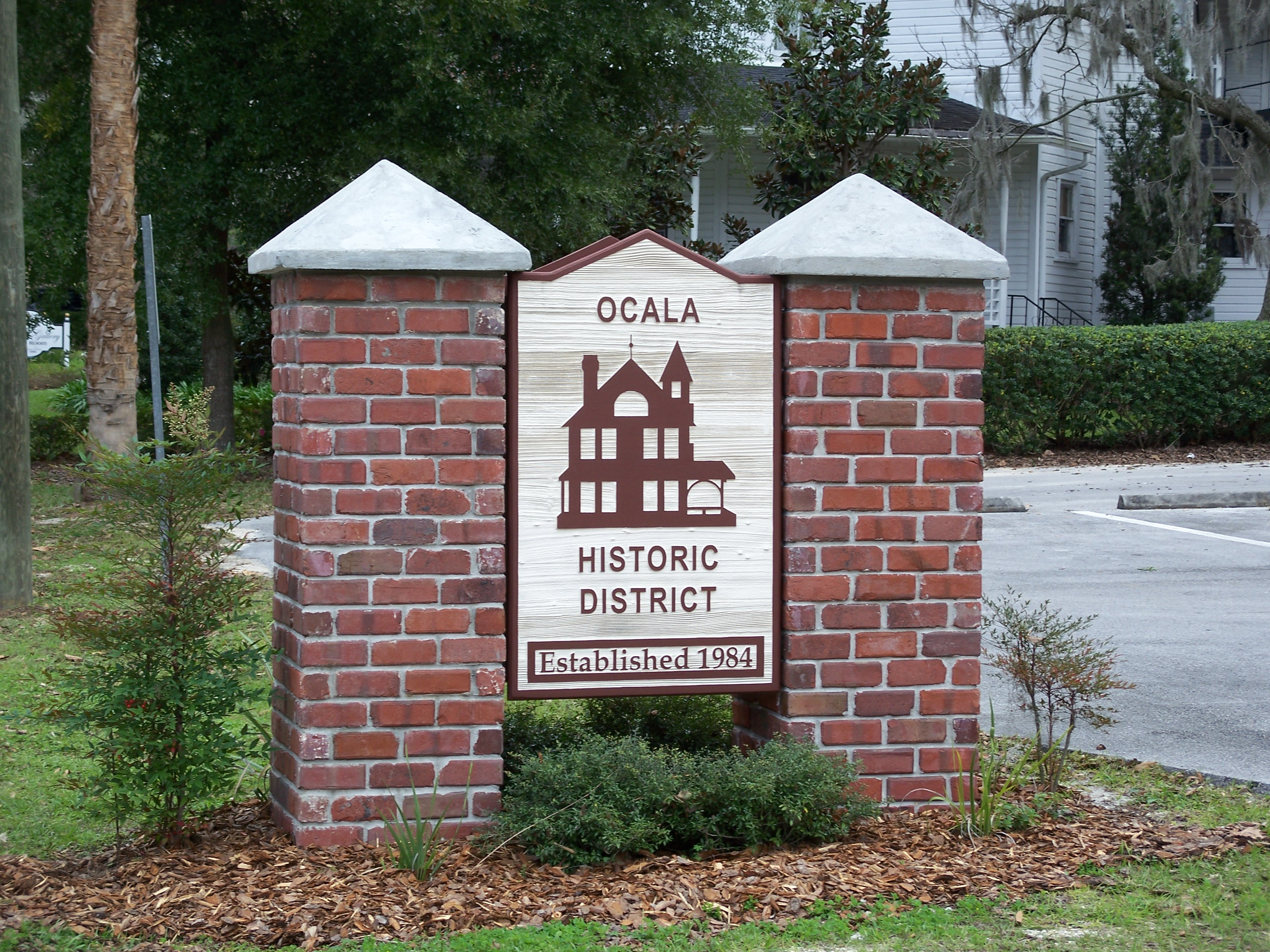
- Western entrance to Ocala's Residential Historic District

- Location within Florida Location within the United States
- Location: Ocala, Florida United States
- Coordinates: 29°11′0″N 82°7′42″W
- Area: 172 acres (0.70 km^{2})
- Built: 1880-1930
- NRHP reference No.: 84000912
- Added to NRHP: January 12, 1984

The Ocala Historic District is a U.S. Historic District (designated as such on January 12, 1984) located in Ocala, Florida. It encompasses 172 acres (0.70 km^{2}), and is bounded by Broadway, Southeast 8th Street, Silver Springs Place, Southeast 3rd, 13th, and Watula Avenues. It contains 220 historic buildings.

Development for the original residential properties had started sometime in 1880 and continued to 1930, with the most construction invoked by the Florida boom in 1910. The oldest part of the neighborhood is on the King Street, which then sprawled eastbound. Architectural style reflecting the boom includes bungalows, contrasted to the Queen Anne Revival style on the older streets including the King.
