= Marion County Public Library System =

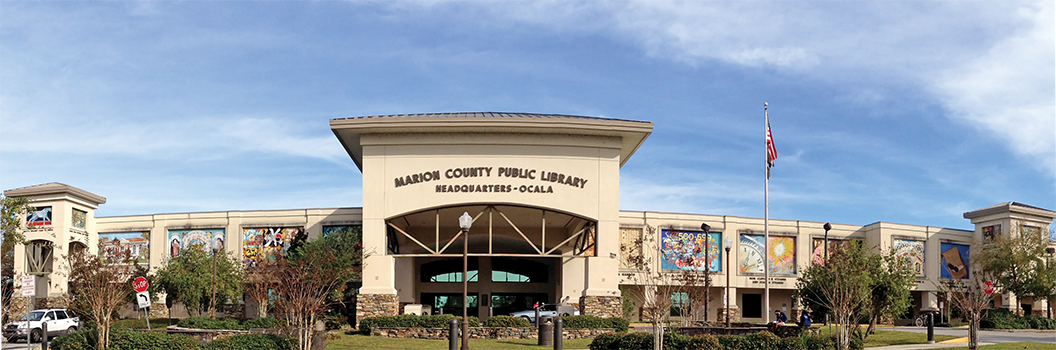
Marion County Public Library System headquarters

The Marion County Public Library System serves Marion County, Florida (located in central Florida) through nine library locations in the county. The nine branches serve over an estimated 400,000 people in Marion County, Florida.

== History ==
The first circulating library in Ocala opened in 1886 and was located in the Ocala News Department. It cost each member one dollar for a two-year membership and borrowing privileges. This establishment was followed by a library in the Hotel Ocala which was established by the Women's Library Association. This enterprising group of women pursued the option of having a Carnegie Library located in Ocala. Their efforts resulted in the creation of the Ocala Free Public Library in 1914. This act established the tax levy and community support required by the Carnegie Foundation as prerequisites for a grant. In 1916 the Ocala Carnegie Library was constructed on the site secured for this purpose in 1914. In 1961 the City of Ocala, and neighboring Citrus and Levy Counties joined to create the Central Florida Regional Library. The other libraries that existed in Marion County (Belleview and Dunnellon) joined the system in 1964. Changes continued as Citrus County separated from the system in 1987 and Levy County in 1999. These changes resulted in what now stands as the Marion County Public Library System.

=== Headquarters – Ocala Public Library ===
The first, permanent, physical library built in Ocala was the Ocala Carnegie Library, built in 1916. The Ocala Carnegie Library opened its doors on September 11, 1916, according to an article of the Ocala Evening Star distributed that same day. Though the library was not fully furnished, it was decided to be opened on September 11 in order to avoid a further delay. The posted hours when the Carnegie Library first opened was weekdays from 8 am to 10 am and 4 pm to 8 pm, but in subsequent issues of the Ocala Evening Star, the Ocala Carnegie Library's librarian, Louise Gamsby, made notice that the library's hours had changed to weekdays 9 am to 11 am and 4 pm to 8 pm.

The original Carnegie Library building was demolished in 1968 to make way for the new Ocala Public Library constructed on the same site. The new Ocala Public Library was considered by some to be "unusual in many respects … a real asset to the community … a thing of beauty." An article in the Ocala Star-Banner from 1967 described the new Ocala Public Library as "hexagonal in shape, not unlike that of a circus tent." The hexagonal shape was chosen in order to for the library to have as much usable space while also not surpassing the budget. The plan was for all library services to take place on the first floor while the bookmobile and a workroom would have room in the building's basement. The building used skylights and extensive use of glass walls in order to allow in natural light.

Due to the extraordinary growth in Marion County from 1970 through 2000, the Ocala Public Library was once again in need of additional space. The six-sided Ocala Public Library closed its doors at 6 pm on June 19, 2004. The current Headquarters – Ocala Public Library was opened in August 2004 in a refurbished department store. The front of the building displays original mosaic artwork depicting subject areas of the Dewey Decimal System.

=== Belleview Public Library ===
The Belleview Public Library is one of the oldest libraries in Florida that continues to serve the public. This library was originally opened in 1886 as a Reading Room by the Library Association of Belleview. The original structure fell victim to fire in 1904 and was rebuilt in the same location in 1908. This new Belleview Library location served the community of Belleview for many years to come. The building was modified several times from 1908 through 2008 when the Belleview Public Library finally moved into a new building which was constructed on land that was a gift to the Marion County Public Library System from the Goolsby family in honor of their parents. Today the old Belleview Library building is home to the Friends of the Belleview Public Library and their used book store. The Friends of the Belleview Library run, in conjuncture, The Belleview Historical Library Museum in the used book store and have preserved library related artifacts dating from 1836 to present.

=== Dunnellon Public Library ===
In the 1950s the Dunnellon Women's Club provided the first lending library in Dunnellon. It consisted of a few shelves of books and volunteers from the Dunnellon Women's Club maintained the small collection. In 1961 a library was built in Dunnellon on land donated by the City of Dunnellon. This library location served Dunnellon until 2008 when the current building was completed and the new Dunnellon Public Library opened.

=== Forest Public Library ===
The Forest Public Library was first located in an old bookmobile which was staffed with volunteers. In 1996 the Forest Public Library moved into a permanent structure where it served the community until 2010. In 2010 a new Forest Public Library was constructed and library services were significantly expanded. The new Forest Public Library is a LEED certified building, the first Gold certified LEED building in Marion County.

=== Fort McCoy Public Library ===
The historic Fort McCoy Public Library building sits on land that was deeded by Percy F. Lisk to the Marion County school system in 1932. In 1936, the schoolhouse was built. The property and building were later deeded to Marion County in 1989. In June 1996, the Fort McCoy Public Library opened its doors. The Fort McCoy Public Library's building also includes a pre-existing auditorium space with a beautiful stage, original hardwood floors, and an open seating area. This historic building has undergone significant renovations to more appropriately house the library and serve the community.

=== Freedom Public Library ===
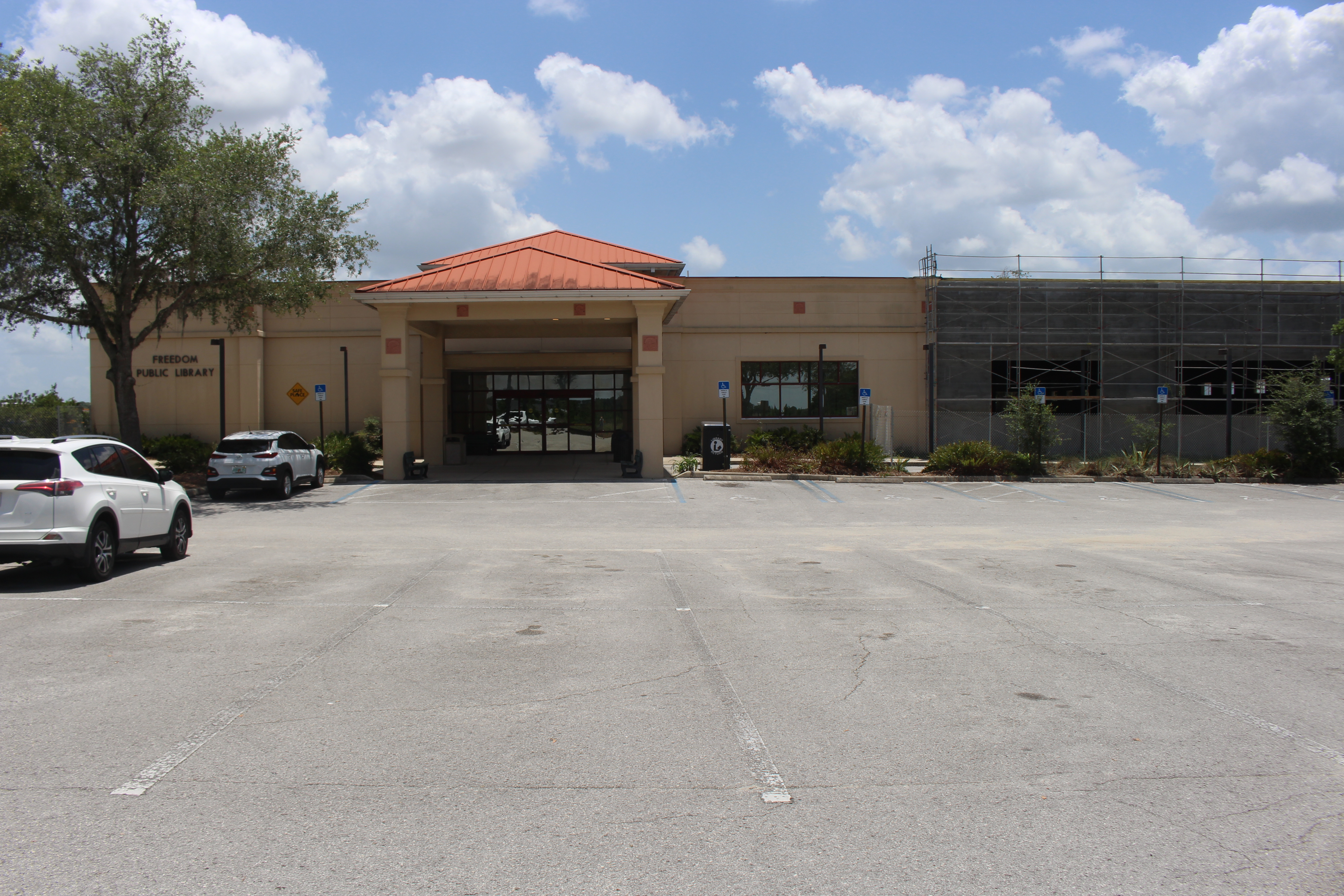
Freedom Public Library

The Freedom Public Library opened in 2000. This library building provides library services to community members residing in the southwest corridor of Marion County. The Freedom Public Library's name was the result of a process where community members offered possible names for the library location and the County Commissioners chose the name from those suggestions

=== Marion Oaks Public Library ===
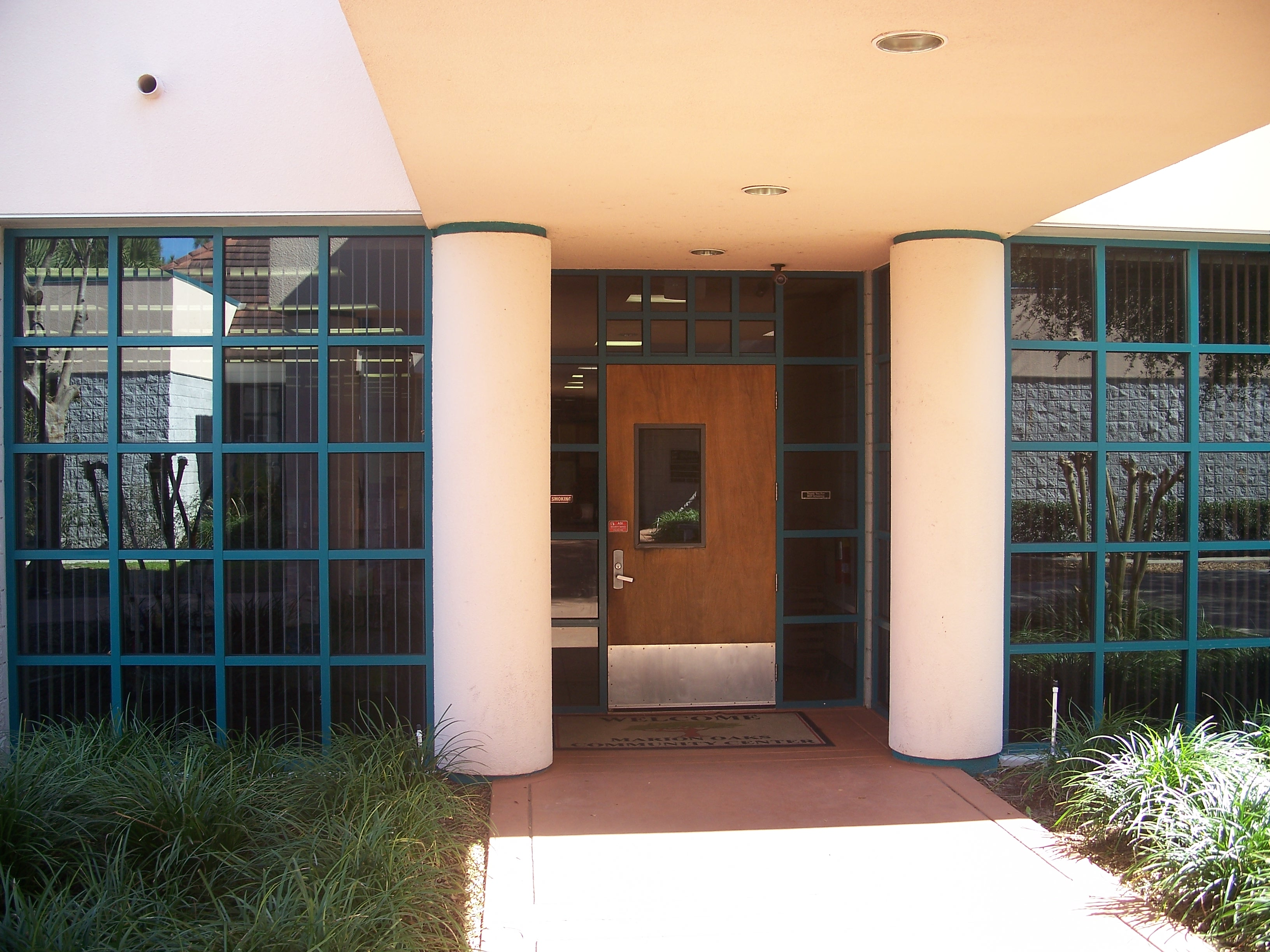
Marion Oaks Public Library

The Marion Oaks Public Library began as a result of community members coming together to provide public library service to the community. Volunteers of the Friends of the Library raised the funds, secured the current location in the Marion Oaks Community Center, and staffed the Marion Oaks location with the express desire that it become part of the library system. In 1996 their hopes were realized when the Marion Oaks Public Library became part of the Central Florida Regional Library System and subsequently part of the Marion County Public Library System.

=== Reddick Public Library ===
In 1988 the Reddick Public Library opened in a church fellowship hall. Since 1993, then it has moved into the former Reddick Elementary School media center and continues to serve the community members in the northwest area Marion County after being leased to the Marion County School Board. Reddick Public Library had its 35th anniversary in 2023. Operations originally funded by the Town of Reddick were gradually assumed in the library system's budget.

=== Sankofa Public Library ===
Sankofa Public Library is located in the Mary Sue Rich Community Center in Ocala, Florida. Sankofa Public Library opened its doors to patrons on January 10, 2023. This community center is named after Mary Sue Rich, former City of Ocala Councilwoman. Along with the Sankofa Public Library, the Mary Sue Rich Community Center has two basketball courts, gym equipment, and event space.

https://library.marionfl.org/
