= Bradenton Carnegie Library =

- U.S. National Register of Historic Places
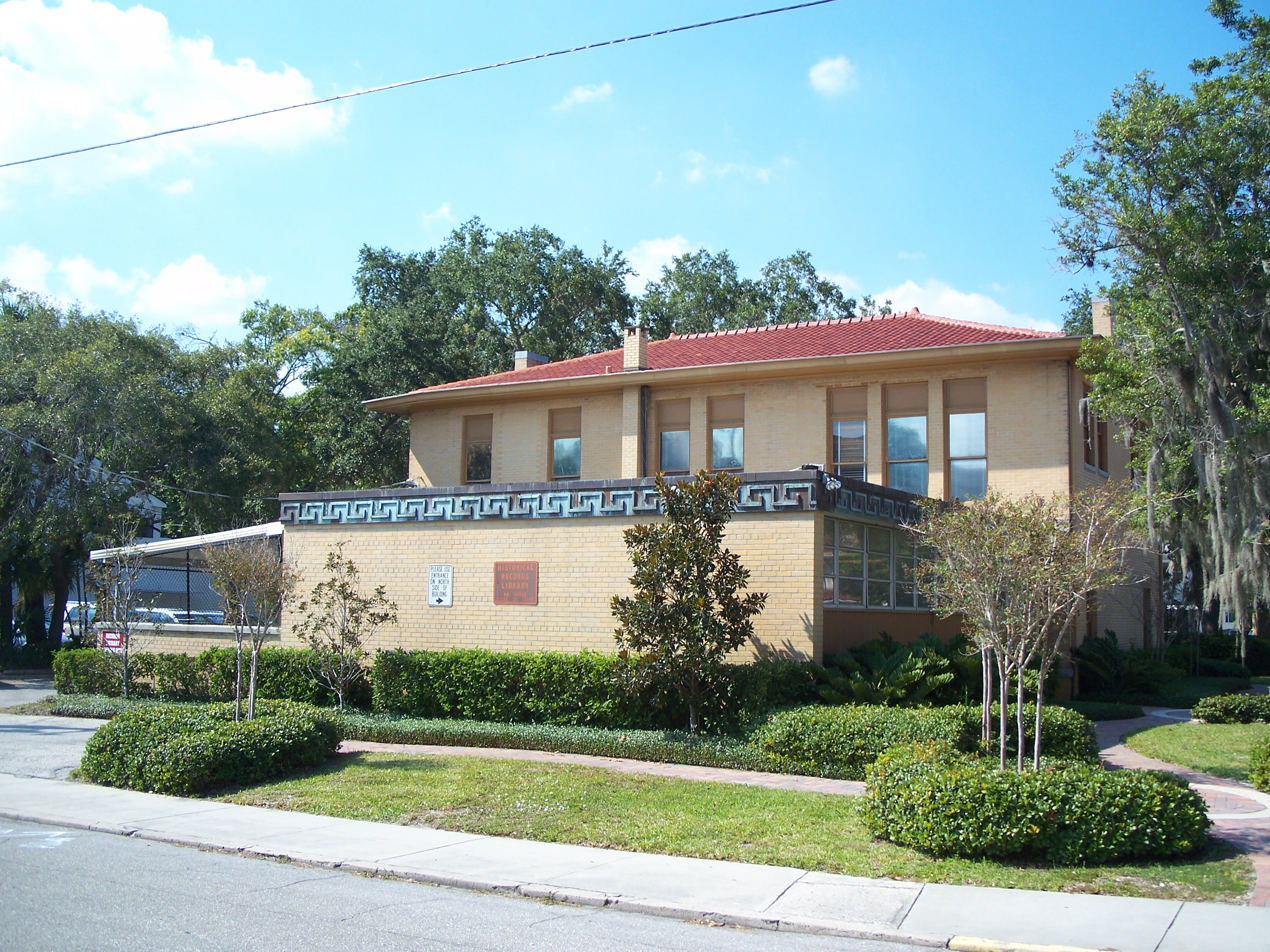

- Location within Florida Location within the United States
- Location: 1405 4th Avenue W, Bradenton; Florida 34205
- Coordinates: 27°29′46″N 82°34′33″W
- Built: 1918
- Built by: T.W. Hullinger & Son
- Architectural style: Classical Revival
- NRHP reference No.: 87000616
- Added to NRHP: 9 April 1987

The Bradenton Carnegie Library is a Carnegie library in Bradenton, Florida. It was founded in 1918, served as Bradenton's main library for 60 years, and now houses the Manatee County Historical Records Library. It was added to the U.S. National Register of Historic Places in 1987.

== History ==
Steel magnate and philanthropist Andrew Carnegie provided funding for more than 3,000 Carnegie libraries in the United States, Canada, and Europe. The Bradenton Carnegie Library, in Bradenton, was one of ten Florida Carnegie libraries to receive grants from the Carnegie Corporation of New York between 1901 and 1917, six of which still stand.

When the residents of Bradenton first approached the Carnegie foundation seeking a grant around 1906, they were turned down. It was only after repeated negotiations with the foundation that Bradenton was eventually awarded a $10,000 grant for the creation of the library.

The Library is an important piece in the library history of Manatee County, serving as one of the libraries that marked the beginnings of the county's library system. It was also the base of operations for the county's very first bookmobile in 1956.

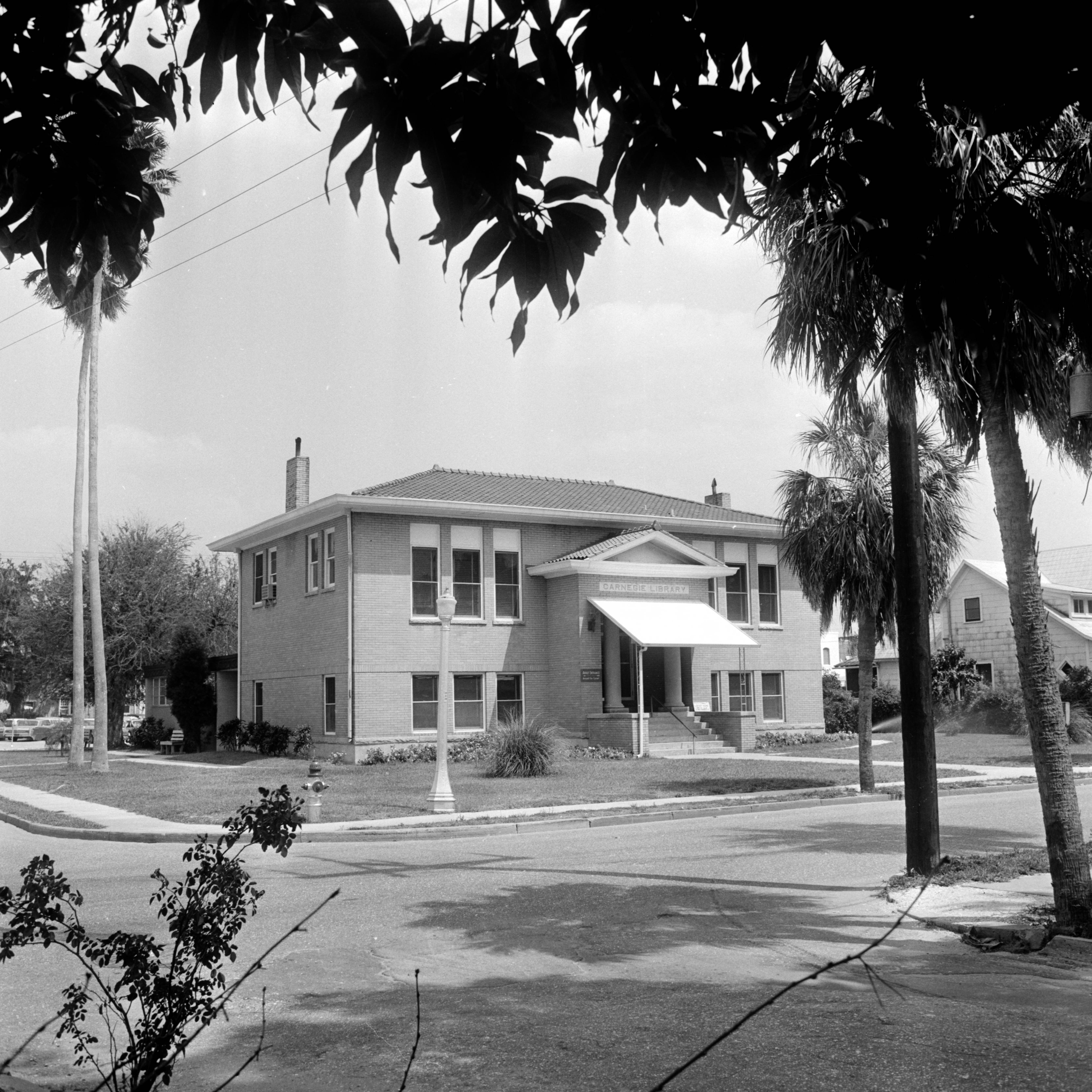
Bradenton Carnegie Library

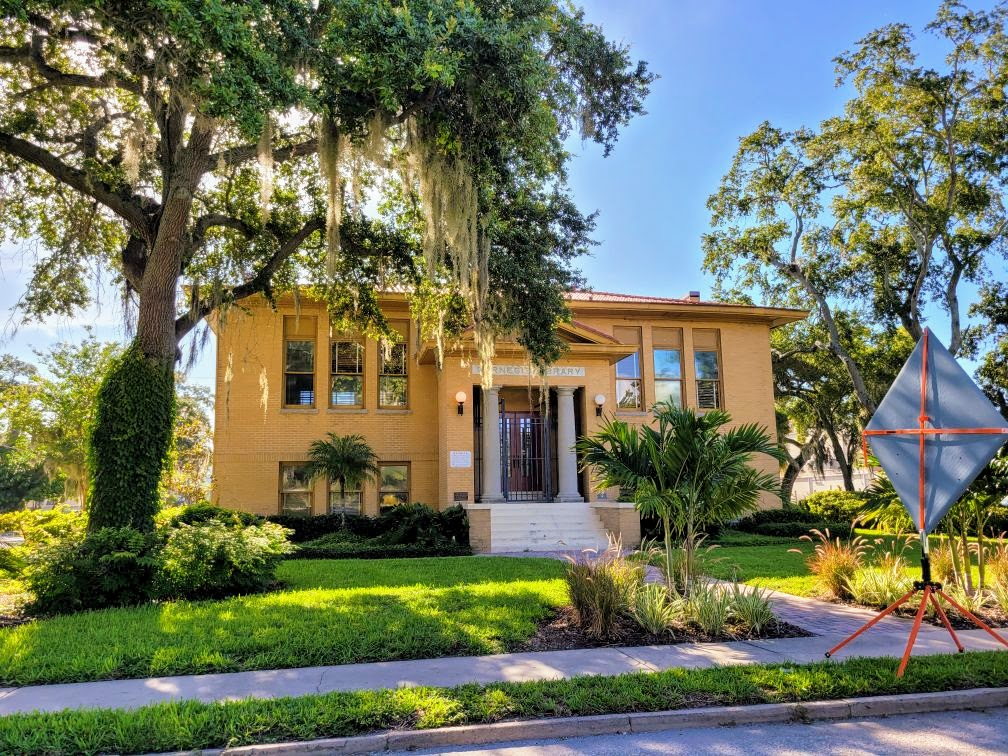
Viewed from 15th Street W.

The library was built in the Classical Revival style to Carnegie Library Plans #205. Carnegie Libraries were normally constructed with basements, however due to being in Florida this was not able to occur, so the library is two stories tall to fulfill requirements. The original Bradenton Carnegie library opened in 1918 and served as Bradenton's main library for 60 years.

Although its address is 1405 Fourth Avenue, West, the library actually faces onto 14th Street, West. The original 14th Street facade has been obscured by an addition that did not follow the style of the original building.

The library was employed as the first meeting place for the Manatee Genealogical Society, whose first meeting was held in 1974. It would continue to be used by the Society until 1979, when the group relocated to the newly opened Central Library.

The Carnegie Library's function as the primary library of Manatee County ceased with the opening of the Central Library in 1978. Soon after the opening of Bradenton's Central Library, the Carnegie Library was leased by then County Clerk of Manatee County Richard “Chips” Shore. He did this with the intention of setting up the building as a new historical records library. This new historical records library opened to the public on June 1, 1979.

On April 9, 1987, it was added to the U.S. National Register of Historic Places.

Today, it is the Historical Records Library operated by the office of the Manatee County Clerk of the Circuit Court, and serves as the official archives of the county government. The site contains more than 100,000 official records, which includes governmental records, marriage licenses, maps, yearbooks, voter registration books, and military discharge books among many other items, that date back to 1856. The library also houses the Herb Loomis Manatee County Postcard Collection and the Steve Belack Crosley collection. Its staff provide assistance to researchers and those seeking to learn about the county's history.
