= Emergency Medical Services Alliance =

EMSA, Inc. Logo

Marion County’s Emergency Medical Services Alliance, Inc. (EMSA) was a non-profit governmental Emergency Medical Services (EMS) agency created by a partnership between The Marion County, Florida Board of County Commissioners, The City of Ocala, Ocala Regional Medical Center/West Marion Community Hospital and Munroe Regional Medical Center. EMSA was responsible for providing leadership, field supervision and medical direction for 911 based emergency medical services responses, patient contacts, and ambulance transportation within the 1,653-square-mile (4,280 km^{2}) service area in North Central Florida from 2003 to 2008.

== About EMSA ==
Emergency Medical Services Alliance was formed on October 1, 2003. It was an alliance of Marion County, Governed by a Board of Directors. The Board consists of the County Administrator, Ocala City Manager, The CEO of Ocala Regional Medical Center, CEO of Monroe Regional Medical Center, and the President of Central Florida Community College. Prior to the formation of the alliance, the Emergency Medical Services for Marion County were provided by Munroe Regional Hospital. As of October 1, 2008, EMSA was dissolved and the responsibilities for providing Emergency Medical Services and ambulance transport for Marion County were turned over to Marion County Fire-Rescue.

Ocala Fire-Rescue and Marion County Fire-Rescue responded along with EMSA on certain types of calls, providing first-response Advanced Life Support on critical patients and extrication on automobile accidents. At the time, Marion County Fire-Rescue also had 4 transport vehicles to handle calls in the rural areas, including three in the Ocala National Forest. EMSA was dispatched by their own communicators operating out of the Marion County Sheriff's Office PSAP (Public Safety Answering Point). 911 calls were answered by Marion County Sheriff's Office, and then transferred to an EMSA calltaker who then would enter the call into the Computer Aided Dispatch (CAD) System. Another dispatcher would notify the closest ambulance via radio while the calltaker gives pre-arrival medical instructions to the caller if needed. This practice is still applied with Marion County Fire-Rescue.

== Facts about EMSA ==
Right before the dissolution of EMSA, the population served was 300,000+ with a response area of 1,653 square miles (4,280 km^{2}).

=== Statistics ===
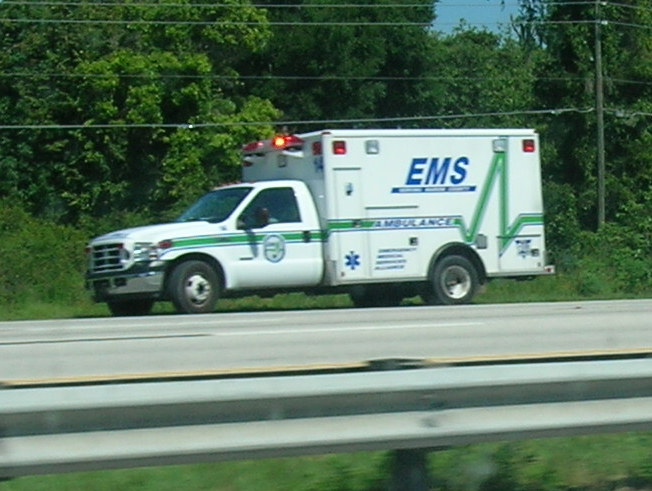
An EMSA ambulance operating at a highway scene

EMSA Statistics (as of 9/21/2006):

- 67 Paramedics
- 66 EMTs
- 36 Support Staff
- 27 Administrative Staff

=== Vehicles ===
EMSA had several vehicles that dynamically post throughout the county:

- 24 F350 Super Duty Ambulances * Advanced Life Support Equipped
- 6 Freightliner Ambulances * Advanced Life Support Equipped
- 2 Road Supervisor Trucks
- 9 Support Units
- 1 John Deere Gator ATV (All-terrain vehicle) * Medically Equipped
- 2 Mini Ambulance Golf Carts * Medically Equipped
- 6 Mountain Bikes * Medically Equipped
- 1 Motorcycle * Medically Equipped

EMSA Ambulances traveled an average of 220 miles per day.
