= European Medical Students' Association =

Organization

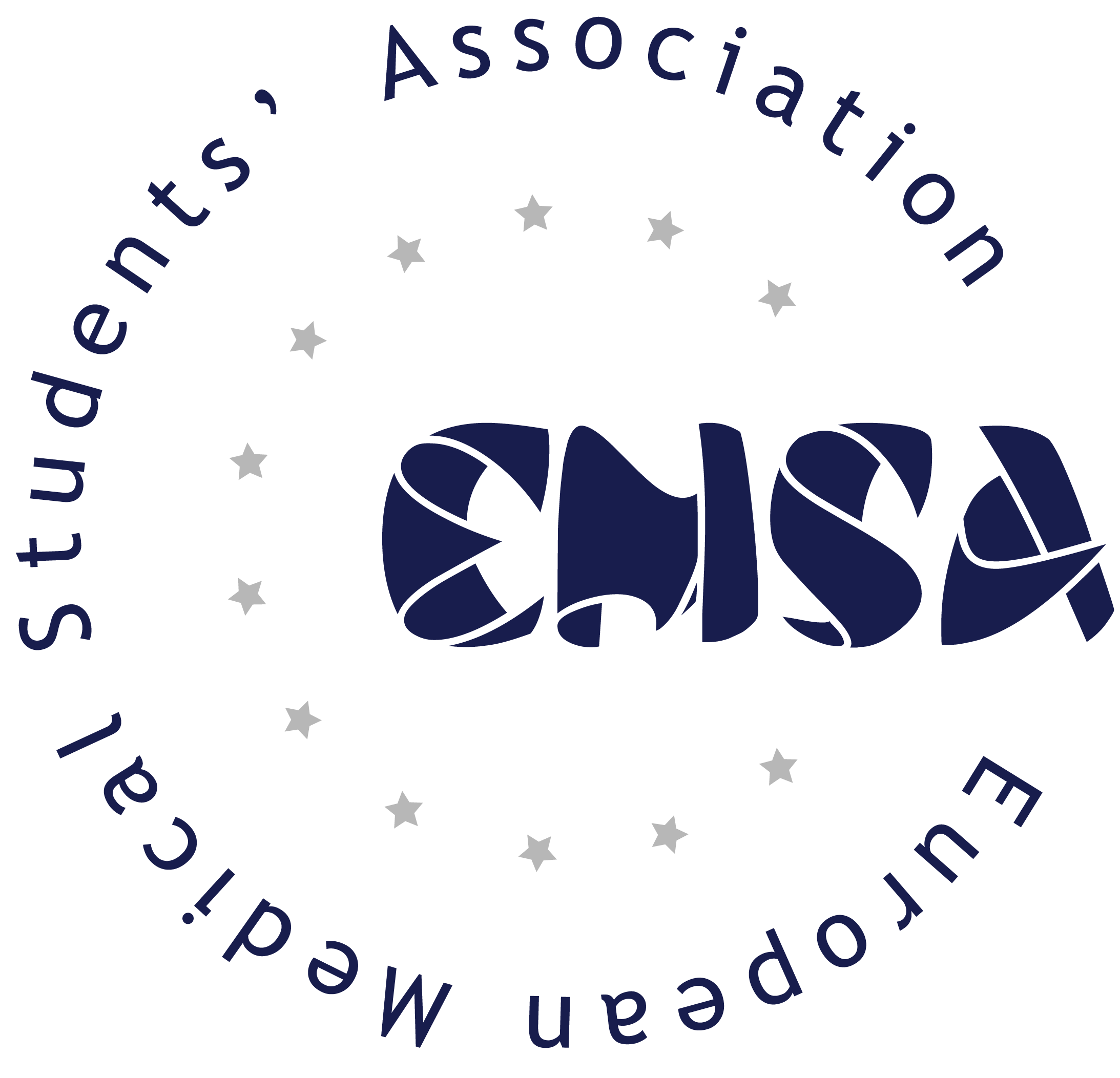
- EMSA Logo
- Formation: 20.10.1990
- Type: International Organization
- Headquarters: Brussels, Belgium
- Location: Europe
- Official language: English
- Website: www.emsa-europe.eu

The European Medical Students' Association (EMSA) is a non-governmental and non-profit organisation for medical students; it offers opportunities to their members and provides a voice for medical students across Europe, representing their interests to other European institutions and organizations. EMSA was founded in Brussels in 1990.

== History ==
In 1990, the idea to create a European Medical Students' Association was discussed during a symposium for medical students from all European countries organized by students of the Catholic University of Leuven (KUL), Belgium. A working group was created and in October 1990 the European Medical Students' Association was founded in Brussels. The first and official founding EMSA General Assembly was under the patronage of Baudouin I, the King of Belgium, and was financially supported by the European Community's ERASMUS program. The statutes were officially established and published under Belgian law on 17 January 1991.

== About EMSA ==
EMSA was founded in Brussels on 20.10.1990. It integrates medical students in Europe through activities organized for and by medical students and representing them in Brussels. In EMSA medical faculties are members, not the individual countries. Since the foundation of EMSA many medical faculties throughout Europe enrolled with EMSA. It currently unites over 130 medical faculties from 30 countries across Europe. EMSA seeks to improve the health and the quality of care of the citizens of Europe by acting as a conduit for increased interaction and sharing of knowledge between European medical students in the areas of medical education, ethics, science and European integration.

EMSA is an associated organisation of the CPME Standing Committee of European Doctors.

== Structure ==
The structure of EMSA which allows maximum effectiveness and control involves the EMSA European Board (EEB) on the European level, the National Coordinators (NCs) on the National Level, and the Local Coordinators (LCs) on the Local Level. In the structure of EMSA, medical faculties are members, not the individual countries; these Medical Faculties are referred to as Faculty Member Organizations (FMOs). Since the foundation of EMSA, many medical faculties throughout Europe have enrolled with EMSA. It currently unites over 130 medical faculties from over 30 countries across Europe.

== Governance ==
The main Governance of the European Medical Students' Association is the EMSA European Board (EEB). In the fall of each year, the EEB is elected during the Autumn Assembly. The EEB is made up of :

The Executive Board (EB):
President, Secretary General, Vice President of Internal Affairs, Vice President of External affairs, Vice President of Capacity, Treasurer

Directors: Medical Science Director, Medical Education Director, Ethics and Human Rights Director, Public Health Director, European Integration and Culture Director, European Health Policy Director

Officers: Trainings and Events Officer, Students Organisations Liaison Officer, Resource Development Officer, Public Relations Officer

Appointed Officers: CPME Intern, Medical Education Liaison Officer EuroMeds Editor-in-chief

The current Secretary General & Acting President is Dr. Gabriel Camilleri (Malta).
