= Ocala, Florida =

- City
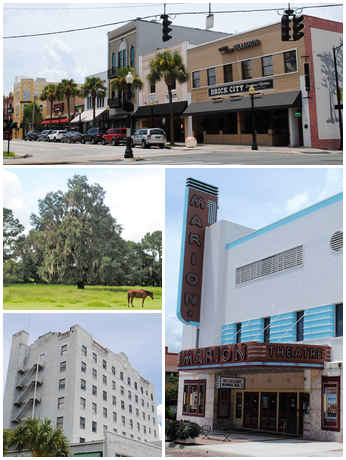
- Top, left to right: Downtown Ocala, horse on a farm, Marion Hotel, Marion Theatre

- Flag Seal
- Nicknames: "Horse Capital of the World" "Brick City"
- Motto: "God Be With Us"
- Interactive map of Ocala, Florida
- Location within Florida
- Coordinates: 29.1775°N 82.1510°W
- Country: United States
- State: Florida
- County: Marion
- Founded: 1849
- Incorporated (town): February 4, 1869
- Incorporated (city): January 28, 1885

Government
  - Type: Council–Manager
  - Mayor: Ben Marciano
  - City manager: Peter Lee
  - President: Ire Bethea, Sr.
  - Vice president: Jay Musleh
  - Councilmembers: Barry Mansfield; Kristen Dreyer; James Hilty, Sr.

Area
  - City: 48.078 sq mi (124.521 km^{2})
  - Land: 48.072 sq mi (124.505 km^{2})
  - Water: 0.0058 sq mi (0.015 km^{2}) 0.01%
- Elevation: 69 ft (21 m)

Population (2020)
  - City: 63,591
  - Estimate (2025): 71,753
  - Rank: US: 545th FL: 42nd
  - Density: 1,322.8/sq mi (510.75/km^{2})
  - Urban: 182,647 (US: 202nd)
  - Urban density: 1,460/sq mi (564/km^{2})
  - Metro: 442,660 (US: 123rd)
  - Metro density: 279/sq mi (107.6/km^{2})
- Time zone: UTC–5 (Eastern (EST))
  - Summer (DST): UTC–4 (EDT)
- ZIP Codes: 34470-34483
- Area code: 352
- FIPS code: 12-50750
- GNIS feature ID: 2404415
- Website: ocalafl.gov

Ocala (/oʊˈkælə/ oh-KAL-ə) is a city in and the county seat of Marion County, Florida, United States. Located in North Central Florida. The population was 63,591 as of the 2020 census, and was estimated at 71,753 in 2025, making it the 42nd-most populated city in Florida. It is the principal city of the Ocala metropolitan area, which had a population of 442,660 in 2025.

Home to over 400 thoroughbred farms and training centers, Ocala has been called the "Horse Capital of the World". Notable attractions include the Ocala National Forest, Silver Springs State Park, Rainbow Springs State Park, the College of Central Florida, and the World Equestrian Center.

== History ==
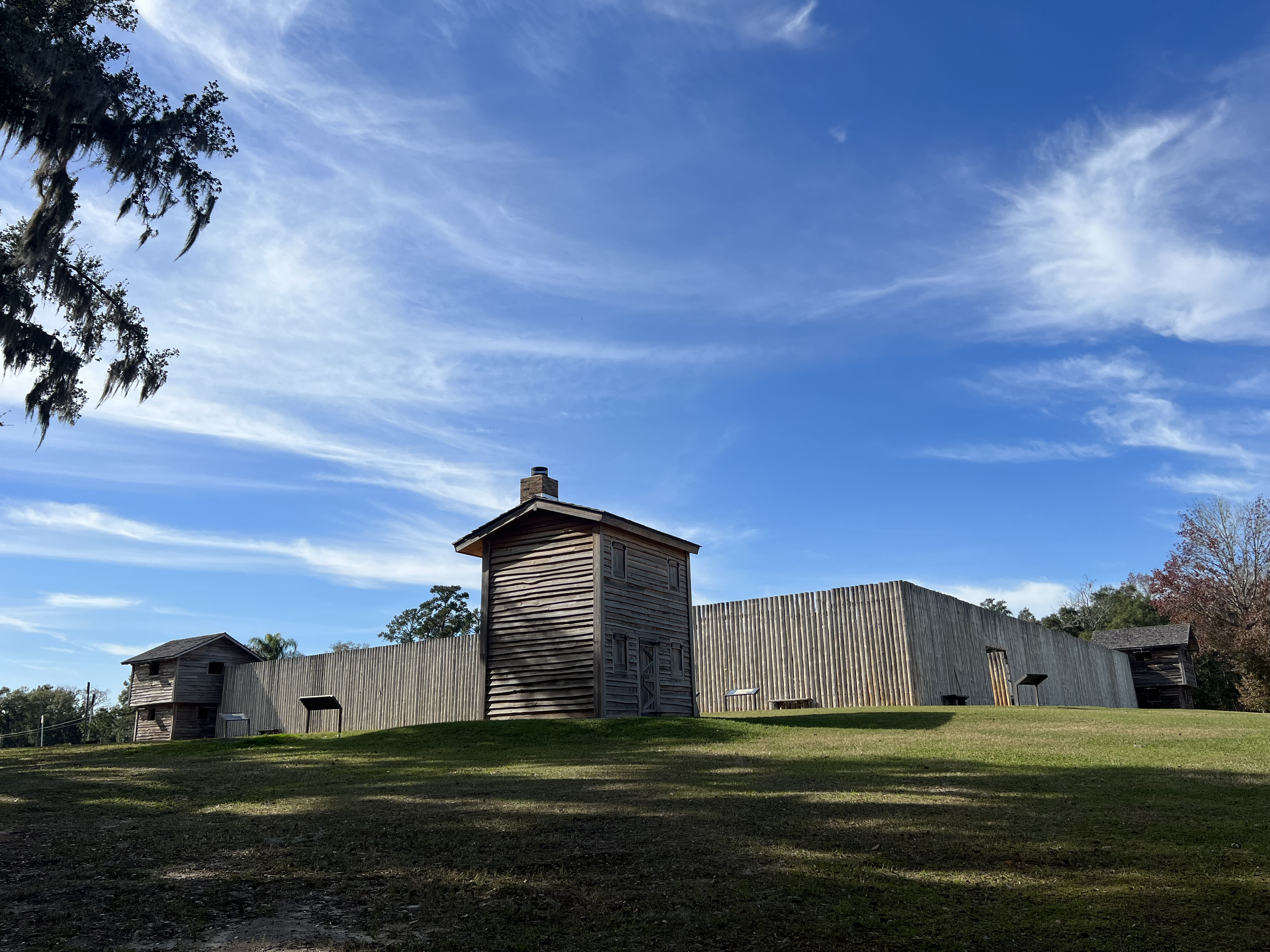
The Fort King reconstructed fortress in Ocala Florida

Ocala is named after Ocale (also Cale, Etocale, and other variants), a Timucua village and chiefdom recorded in the 16th century, the name of which is believed to mean "Big Hammock" in the Timucua language. Another possible meaning of the name is "song or singer of admiration or glorification". Spaniard Hernando de Soto's expedition recorded Ocale in 1539 during his exploration through what is today the Southeastern United States. The site of Ocale has not been found, but historians believe it was located in southwestern Marion County, near the Withlacoochee River. References to Ocale, Olagale, and Etoquale occur in 16th and early 17th century sources, but do not specify a location. A Spanish mission named San Luis de Eloquale was established by 1630. Milanich believes the mission was near the Withlacoochee River. Eloquale is not named in a 1655 list of missions, and Ocale (and its variants) disappeared from history.

In the late 18th and early 19th centuries, Creek people and other Native Americans, as well as free and fugitive African Americans sought refuge in Florida. The Seminole people formed. After foreign colonial rule shifted between Spain and Great Britain and back again, in 1821, the United States acquired the territory of Florida. After warfare to the north, in 1827, the U.S. Army built Fort King near the present site of Ocala as a buffer between the Seminole, who had long occupied the area, and white settlers moving into the region. The fort was an important base during the Second Seminole War and later served in 1844 as the first courthouse for Marion County.

The modern city of Ocala, which was established in 1849, developed around the fort site. Greater Ocala is known as the "Kingdom of the Sun". Plantations and other agricultural development dependent on slave labor were prevalent in the region. Ocala was an important center of citrus production until the Great Freeze of 1894–1895. During the Reconstruction Era, Ocala was represented by several African Americans in the Florida House of Representatives and on the local level.

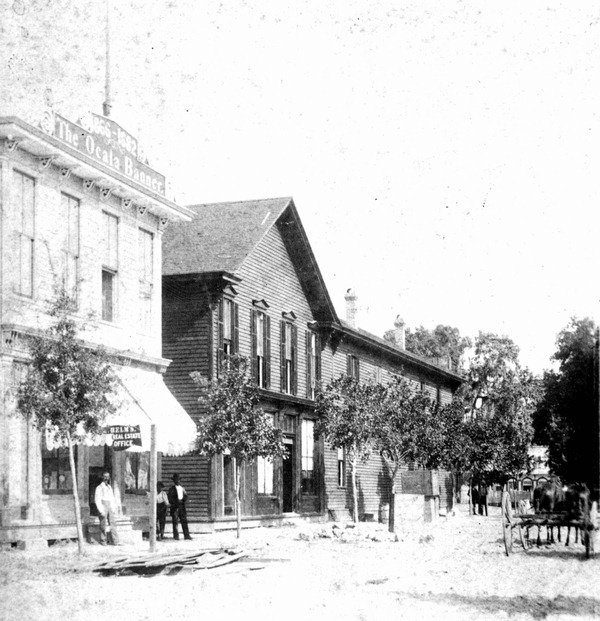
Downtown Ocala in 1883

Rail service reached Ocala in June 1881, encouraging economic development with greater access to markets for produce. Two years later, much of the Ocala downtown area was destroyed by fire on Thanksgiving Day, 1883. The city encouraged rebuilding with brick, granite, and steel rather than lumber. By 1888, Ocala was known statewide as the "Brick City".

In December 1890, the Farmers' Alliance and Industrial Union, a forerunner of the Populist Party, held its national convention in Ocala. At the convention, the alliance adopted a platform that would become known as the "Ocala Demands". This platform included abolition of national banks, promoting low-interest government loans, free and unlimited coinage of silver, reclamation of excess railroad lands by the government, a graduated income tax, and direct election of United States senators. Most of the "Ocala Demands" were to become part of the Populist Party platform.

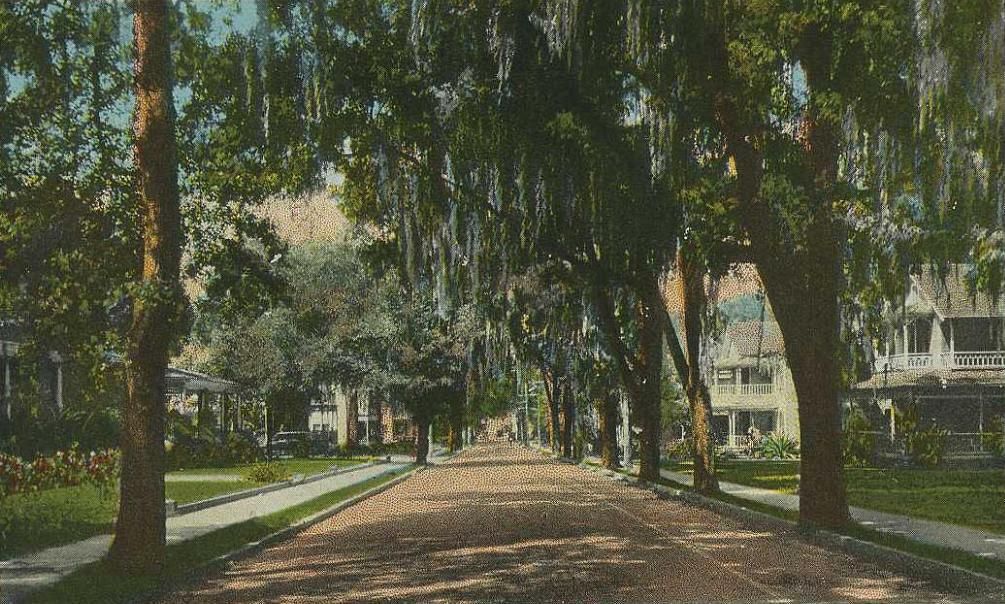
Fort King Street, circa 1920

In the last decades of the 20th century, the greater Ocala area had one of the highest growth rates in the country for a city its size.

=== Ocala Historic District ===
Many historic homes are preserved in Ocala's large residential Historic District, designated in 1984. East Fort King Street features many excellent examples of Victorian architecture. Ocala structures listed on the National Register of Historic Places include the Coca-Cola Building, E. C. Smith House, East Hall, Marion Hotel, Mount Zion A.M.E. Church, Ritz Historic Inn, and Union Train Station. The original Fort King site was designated as a National Historic Landmark in 2004.

== Geography ==
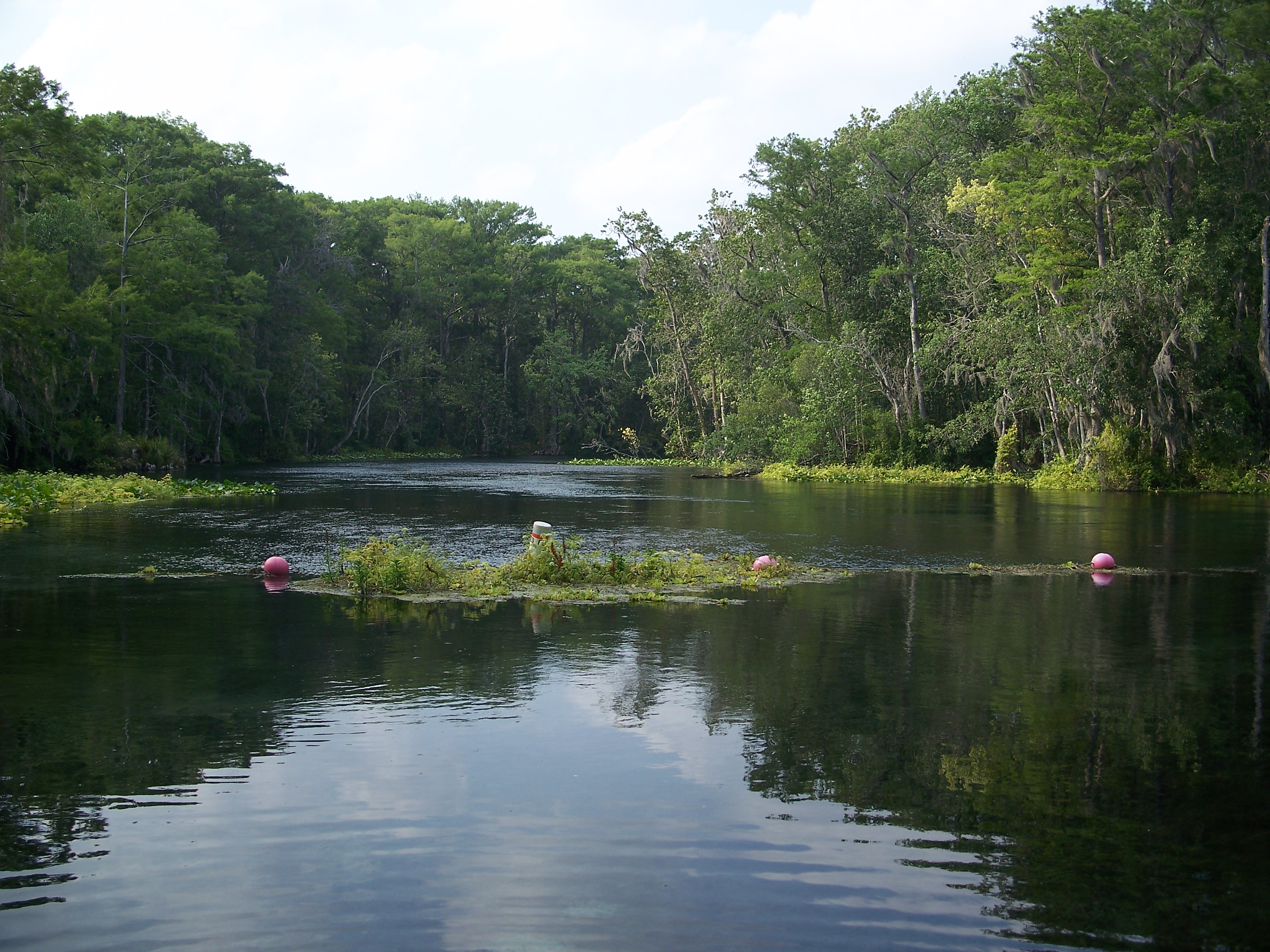
A portion of the Silver River located in Silver Springs State Park

According to the United States Census Bureau, the city has an area of 48.078 square miles (124.52 km^{2}), of which 48.072 square miles (124.51 km^{2}) is land and 0.006 square miles (0.02 km^{2}) (0.01%) is water. The surrounding farms are famous for their Thoroughbred Horses, in terrain similar to Kentucky bluegrass. Ocala is also known for nearby Silver Springs, site of one of the largest artesian spring formations in the world and Silver Springs Nature Theme Park, one of the earliest tourist attractions in Florida.

The 110-mile (180 km) long Ocklawaha River passes 10 mi (16 km) east of Ocala, flowing north from Central Florida until it joins the St. Johns River near Palatka.

Marion County is also home to the Ocala National Forest, which was established in 1908, and is now the second-largest national forest in the state. The Florida Trail, also known as the Florida National Scenic Trail, cuts through Ocala National Forest.

Silver Springs State Park was formed as Silver River State Park in 1987, from land the state purchased around the Silver Springs attraction to spare it from development. The state took over Silver Springs itself in 1993 and incorporated it into the park in 2013.

=== Climate ===
Ocala has a humid subtropical climate (Köppen climate classification Cfa), with hot, humid summers and mild winters.

Climate data for Ocala, Florida, 1991–2020 normals, extremes 1893–present
Month	Jan	Feb	Mar	Apr	May	Jun	Jul	Aug	Sep	Oct	Nov	Dec	Year
Record high °F (°C)	88 (31)	90 (32)	97 (36)	98 (37)	102 (39)	105 (41)	104 (40)	103 (39)	101 (38)	98 (37)	94 (34)	90 (32)	105 (41)
Mean maximum °F (°C)	81.9 (27.7)	84.0 (28.9)	87.3 (30.7)	90.8 (32.7)	95.1 (35.1)	96.8 (36.0)	96.6 (35.9)	95.8 (35.4)	94.2 (34.6)	90.8 (32.7)	86.3 (30.2)	82.3 (27.9)	98.0 (36.7)
Mean daily maximum °F (°C)	70.6 (21.4)	73.7 (23.2)	78.6 (25.9)	83.9 (28.8)	88.9 (31.6)	91.0 (32.8)	92.0 (33.3)	91.6 (33.1)	89.5 (31.9)	84.3 (29.1)	77.2 (25.1)	72.2 (22.3)	82.8 (28.2)
Daily mean °F (°C)	58.1 (14.5)	61.0 (16.1)	65.3 (18.5)	70.7 (21.5)	76.4 (24.7)	80.7 (27.1)	82.1 (27.8)	82.0 (27.8)	79.9 (26.6)	73.5 (23.1)	65.4 (18.6)	60.3 (15.7)	71.3 (21.8)
Mean daily minimum °F (°C)	45.6 (7.6)	48.4 (9.1)	52.1 (11.2)	57.4 (14.1)	63.9 (17.7)	70.4 (21.3)	72.2 (22.3)	72.5 (22.5)	70.3 (21.3)	62.7 (17.1)	53.5 (11.9)	48.3 (9.1)	59.8 (15.4)
Mean minimum °F (°C)	27.1 (−2.7)	29.3 (−1.5)	33.5 (0.8)	42.7 (5.9)	52.8 (11.6)	64.5 (18.1)	68.6 (20.3)	68.4 (20.2)	61.9 (16.6)	46.4 (8.0)	35.8 (2.1)	30.4 (−0.9)	24.7 (−4.1)
Record low °F (°C)	11 (−12)	12 (−11)	23 (−5)	30 (−1)	44 (7)	48 (9)	58 (14)	60 (16)	52 (11)	32 (0)	22 (−6)	15 (−9)	11 (−12)
Average precipitation inches (mm)	3.38 (86)	2.94 (75)	3.68 (93)	2.22 (56)	3.53 (90)	7.41 (188)	6.94 (176)	7.07 (180)	6.49 (165)	3.21 (82)	2.09 (53)	2.68 (68)	51.64 (1,312)
Average precipitation days (≥ 0.01 in)	8.6	7.7	7.2	6.3	6.9	15.6	16.8	18.0	13.1	8.2	6.1	6.9	121.4
Source 1: National Oceanic and Atmospheric Administration
Source 2: National Centers for Environmental Information

== Demographics ==
Historical population
Census	Pop.	Note	%±
1850	243		—
1870	600		—
1880	803		33.8%
1890	2,904		261.6%
1900	3,380		16.4%
1910	4,370		29.3%
1920	4,914		12.4%
1930	7,281		48.2%
1940	8,986		23.4%
1950	11,741		30.7%
1960	13,598		15.8%
1970	22,583		66.1%
1980	37,170		64.6%
1990	42,045		13.1%
2000	45,943		9.3%
2010	56,315		22.6%
2020	63,591		12.9%
2025 (est.)	71,753		12.8%
U.S. Decennial Census; 2020 Census

Ocala first appeared in the 1850 U.S. Census, with a total recorded population of 243. Ocala did not report separately in 1860.

According to realtor website Zillow, the average price of a home as of July 31, 2026, in Ocala was $268,444.

As of the 2024 American Community Survey, there were 29,149 estimated households in Ocala with an average of 2.29 persons per household. The city has a median household income of $61,814. Approximately 24.4% of the city's population lives at or below the poverty line. Ocala has an estimated 53.0% employment rate, with 33.8% of the population holding a bachelor's degree or higher and 89.8% holding a high school diploma. There were 32,268 housing units at an average density of 671.24 per square mile (259.2/km^{2}).

The median age in the city was 42.0 years.

Ocala, Florida – racial and ethnic composition Note: the US Census treats Hispanic/Latino as an ethnic category. This table excludes Latinos from the racial categories and assigns them to a separate category. Hispanics/Latinos may be of any race.
Race / ethnicity (NH = non-Hispanic)	Pop. 1980	Pop. 1990	Pop. 2000	Pop. 2010	Pop. 2020
White alone (NH)	26,061 (70.11%)	30,787 (73.22%)	31,982 (69.61%)	35,623 (63.26%)	35,478 (55.79%)
Black or African American alone (NH)	10,374 (27.91%)	9,975 (23.72%)	10,055 (21.89%)	11,497 (20.42%)	11,909 (18.73%)
Native American or Alaska Native alone (NH)	—	110 (0.26%)	156 (0.34%)	117 (0.21%)	104 (0.16%)
Asian alone (NH)	—	249 (0.59%)	551 (1.20%)	1,455 (2.58%)	2,436 (3.83%)
Pacific Islander alone (NH)	—	—	3 (0.01%)	9 (0.02%)	17 (0.03%)
Other race alone (NH)	205 (0.55%)	10 (0.02%)	46 (0.10%)	118 (0.21%)	255 (0.40%)
Mixed race or multiracial (NH)	—	—	514 (1.12%)	910 (1.62%)	2,499 (3.93%)
Hispanic or Latino (any race)	530 (1.43%)	914 (2.17%)	2,636 (5.74%)	6,586 (11.69%)	10,893 (17.13%)
Total	37,170 (100.00%)	42,045 (100.00%)	45,943 (100.00%)	56,315 (100.00%)	63,591 (100.00%)

=== 2020 census ===
As of the 2020 census, there were 63,591 people, 25,531 households, and 14,970 families residing in the city. The population density was 1,345.64 inhabitants per square mile (519.55/km^{2}). There were 28,284 housing units at an average density of 598.51 per square mile (231.09/km^{2}). The racial makeup of the city was 59.98% White, 19.33% African American, 0.33% Native American, 3.86% Asian, 0.03% Pacific Islander, 5.29% from some other races and 11.18% from two or more races. Hispanic or Latino people of any race were 17.13% of the population.

=== 2010 census ===
As of the 2010 census, there were 56,315 people, 23,103 households, and 13,456 families residing in the city. The population density was 1,256.22 inhabitants per square mile (485.03/km^{2}). There were 26,764 housing units at an average density of 597.02 per square mile (230.51/km^{2}). The racial makeup of the city was 70.71% White, 20.94% African American, 0.33% Native American, 2.60% Asian, 0.03% Pacific Islander, 2.94% from some other races and 2.44% from two or more races. Hispanic or Latino people of any race were 11.69% of the population.

=== 2000 census ===
As of the 2000 census, there were 45,943 people, 18,646 households, and 11,280 families residing in the city. The population density was 1,189.21 inhabitants per square mile (459.16/km^{2}). There were 20,501 housing units at an average density of 530.66 per square mile (204.89/km^{2}). The racial makeup of the city was 72.86% White, 22.14% African American, 0.36% Native American, 1.22% Asian, 0.02% Pacific Islander, 1.81% from some other races and 1.59% from two or more races. Hispanic or Latino people of any race were 5.74% of the population.

There were 18,646 households out of which 26.8% have children under the age of 18 living with them, 40.9% were married couples living together, 15.9% have a female householder with no husband present, and 39.5% were non-families. 33.0% of all households were made up of individuals and 15.0% have someone living alone who was 65 years of age or older. The average household size was 2.29 and the average family size was 2.91.

In the city the population was spread out with 23.2% under the age of 18, 9.3% from 18 to 24, 26.2% from 25 to 44, 20.9% from 45 to 64, and 20.4% who were 65 years of age or older. The median age was 39 years. For every 100 females there were 89.7 males. For every 100 females age 18 and over, there were 85.5 males.

The median income for a household in the city was $30,888, and the median income for a family was $38,190. Males have a median income of $29,739 versus $24,367 for females. The per capita income for the city was $18,021. 18.1% of the population and 13.2% of families were below the poverty line. Out of the total people living in poverty, 28.6% were under the age of 18 and 9.8% were 65 or older.

== Economy ==
Ocala is the headquarters of Emergency One, a worldwide designer and manufacturer of fire-rescue vehicles.

=== Top employers ===
According to the City's 2022 Comprehensive Annual Financial Report, the largest employers in the city are:

#	Employer	Type of business	Number of employees	Percentage
1	Marion County Public Schools	Education	7,000	4.70%
2	Ocala Health	Health care	2,712	1.82%
3	AdventHealth Ocala	Health care	2,648	1.78%
4	State of Florida	Government	2,600	1.74%
5	Walmart (five locations)	Retail	2,583	1.73%
6	Lockheed Martin	Aerospace	1,600	1.07%
7	FedEx	E-Commerce	1,500	1.01%
8	Publix	Retail grocery	1,488	1.00%
9	Marion County Board of Commissioners	Government	1,368	0.92%
10	E-One, Inc.	Manufacturer	1,200	0.81%
—	Total	—	24,699	16.57%

== Culture ==
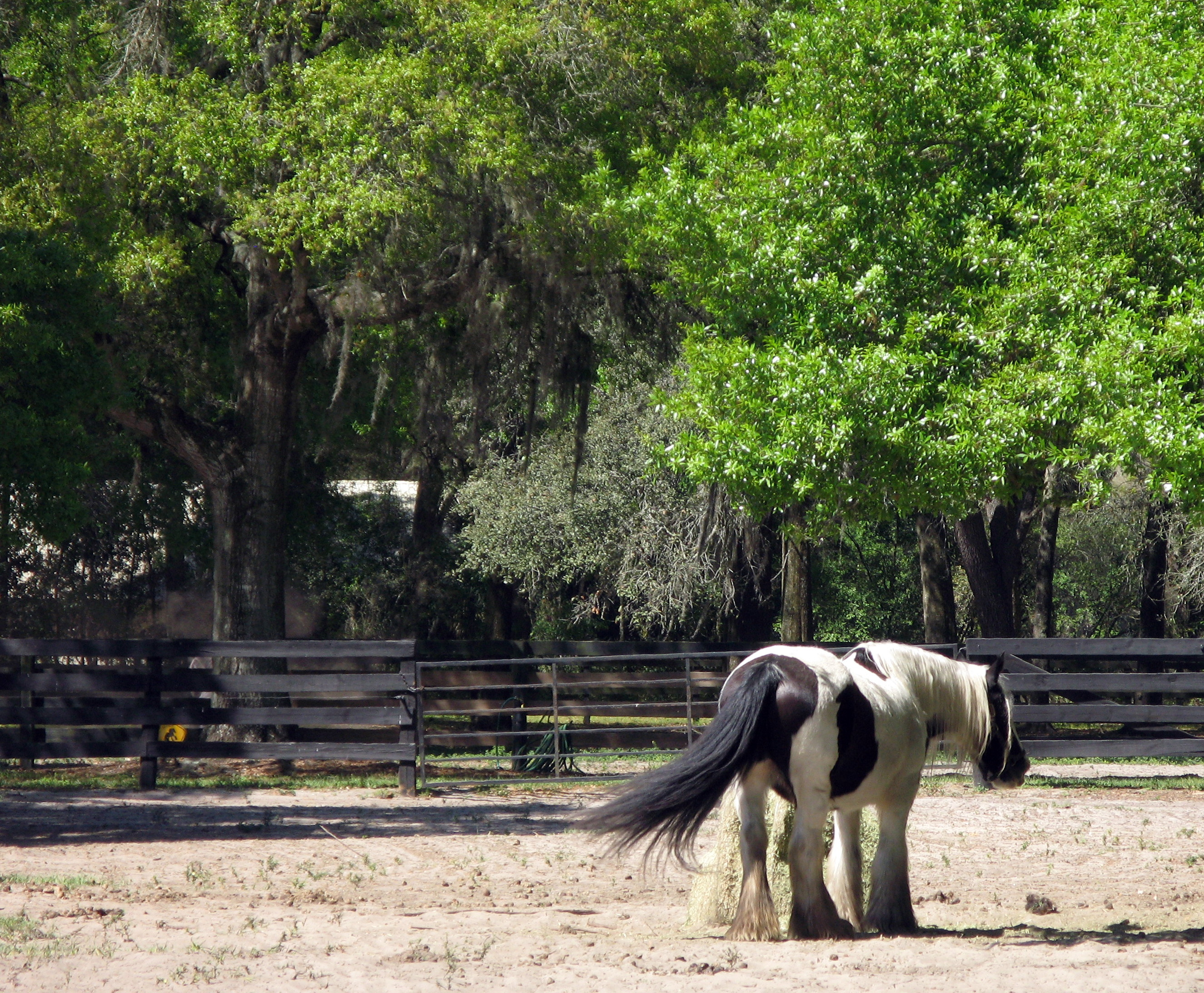
Gypsy Gold Farm, Ocala

Horses have a prominent role in Ocala's cultural makeup. The first Thoroughbred horse farm in Florida was developed in Marion County in 1943 by Carl G. Rose. Other farms were developed, making Ocala the center of a horse-breeding area. Local horses have won individual races of the Triple Crown series; in 1978, Affirmed, bred and trained in Marion County, won all three races, boosting interest in the industry there.

Ocala is one of only five cities (four in the US and one in France) permitted under Chamber of Commerce guidelines to use the title, "Horse Capital of the World", based on annual revenue produced by the horse industry. About 44,000 jobs are sustained by breeding, training, and related support of the equine industry, which generates over $2.2 billion in annual revenue. Postime Farms and Ocala serve as host to one of the largest horse shows in the country: H.I.T.S or "Horses in the Sun", a hunter/jumper event lasting about 12 weeks beginning in January of each year. It generates some $6 to 7 million for the local economy each year. The show features classes for competitive hunters, jumpers, and equitation horses. The World Equestrian Center (WEC) operated by the Roberts family is the largest equestrian venue in the world. WEC plays host to a multitude of breeds and disciplines, attracting competitors from across the globe. Other equine events in the area include mounted shooting by the Florida Outlaws, as well as endurance rides, barrel races, extreme cowboy events, jumper shows, trick shows, parades, draft pulls, and rodeo events. In 2022, Ocala was the site of the inaugural point-to-point Florida Steeplechase at the Florida Horse Park.

== Government and politics ==
Ocala is governed by a five-member board of councillors and a mayor, all of whom are elected on a nonpartisan basis. It has a council-manager form of government, relying on a manager hired by the city. The mayor sets policy, but has few powers other than vetoing legislation passed by the council and tending to some duties involving the police department. The current mayor is Ben Marciano. The city manager handles most administrative and financial matters.

A number of county offices are housed at the McPherson Governmental Complex.

As of 2020, Republicans outnumber Democrats in Marion County, roughly 112,000 to 80,000. In the 2008 presidential election, John McCain carried both the city and the county, the latter by a landslide, although Florida as a whole voted for Democrat Barack Obama by a narrow margin.

== Education ==
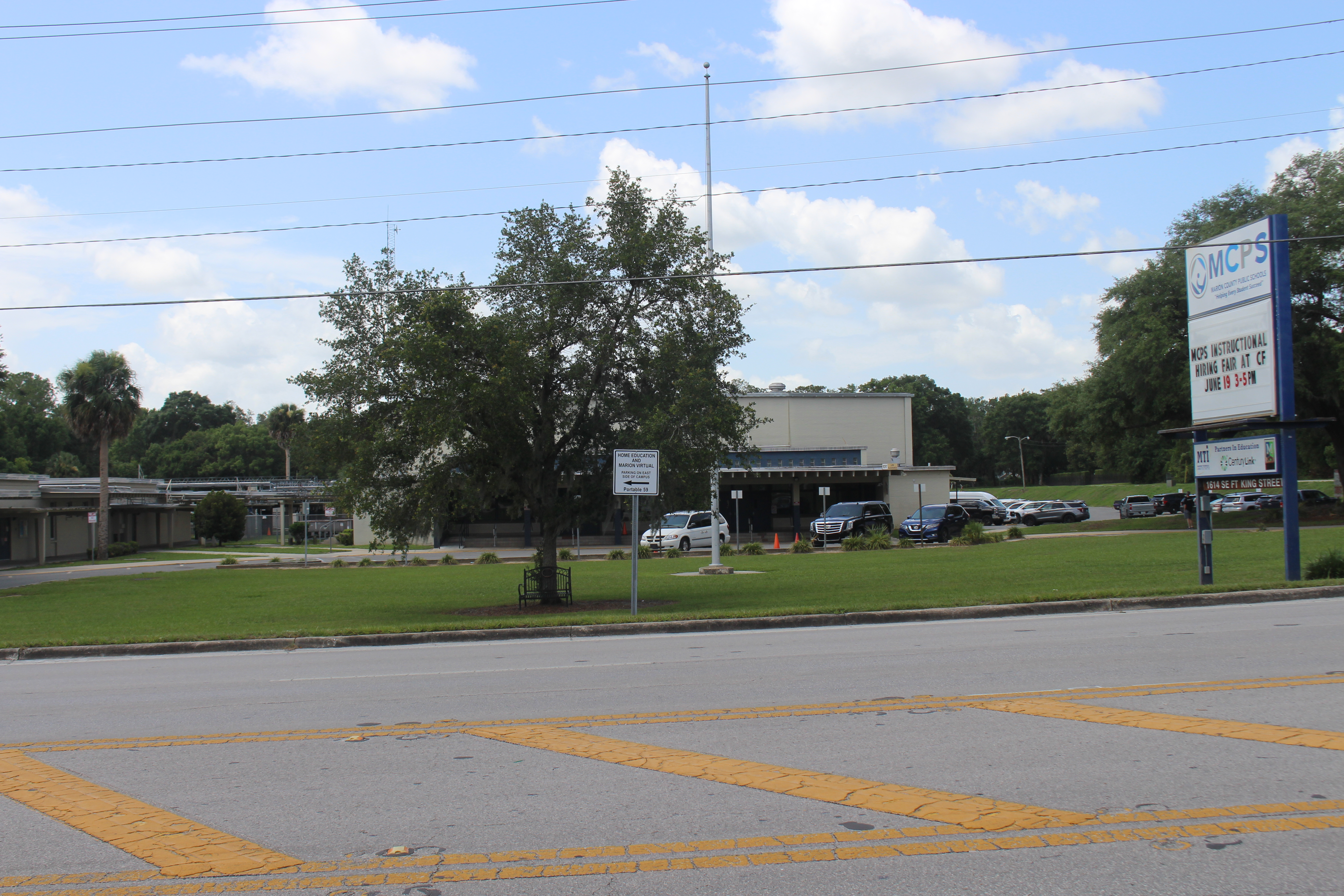
Marion County School Board headquarters

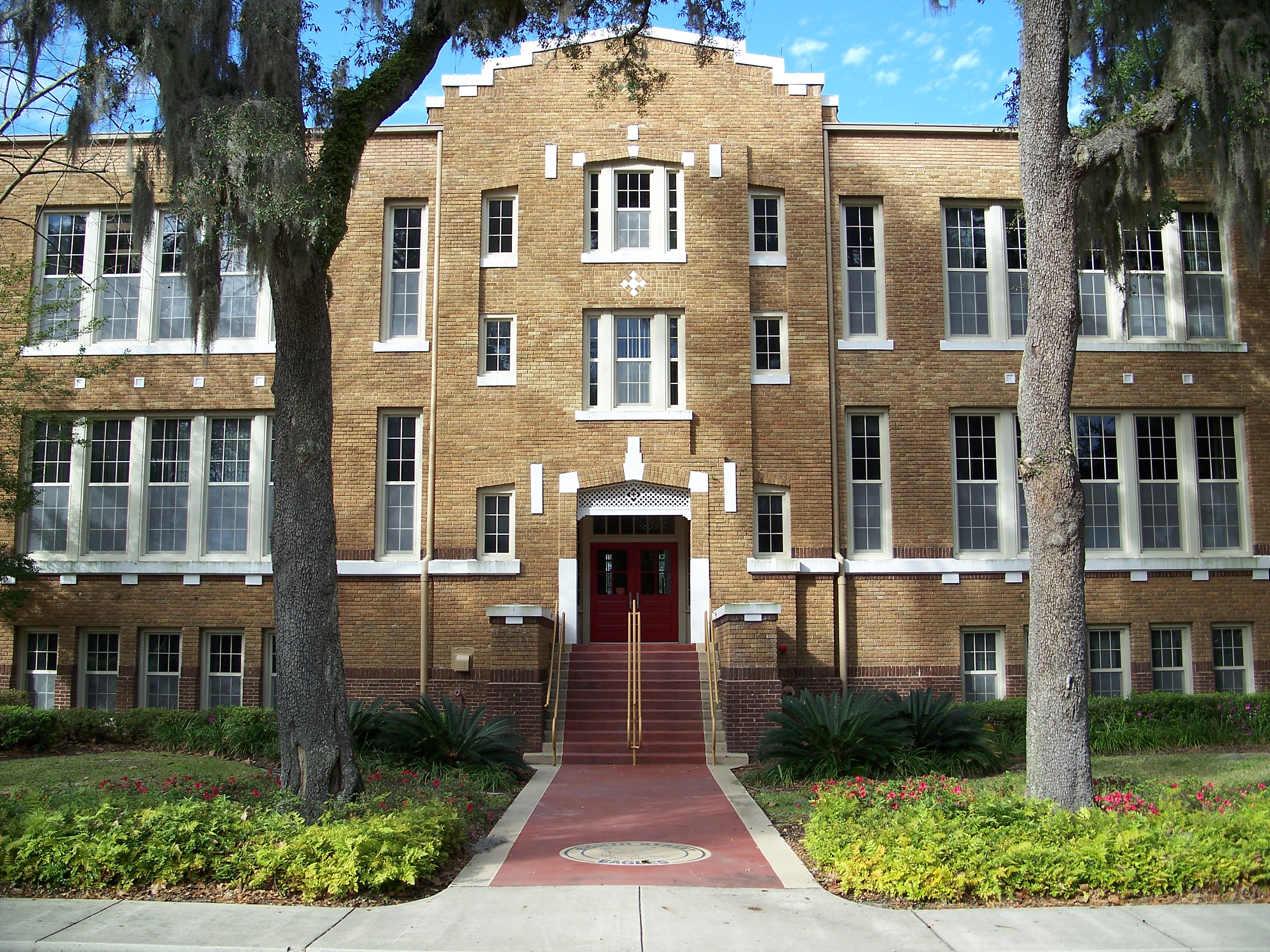
Eighth Street Elementary School, located within the Ocala Historic District

The public schools in Ocala are run by the Marion County Public Schools.

=== Colleges and universities ===
Ocala is home to the College of Central Florida, a member of the Florida College System, accredited by the Southern Association of Colleges and Schools Commission on Colleges. CF offers bachelor's degrees in business and organizational management, early-childhood education, and nursing, as well as associate degrees and certificates. The college offers specialty programs in equine studies, agribusiness, and logistics and supply-chain management. It also has one of 21 campuses of Rasmussen College, a Higher Learning Commission, regionally accredited post-secondary institution. Webster University offers on-site, regionally accredited graduate degree programs in business and counseling at their Ocala Metropolitan Campus.

=== Libraries ===
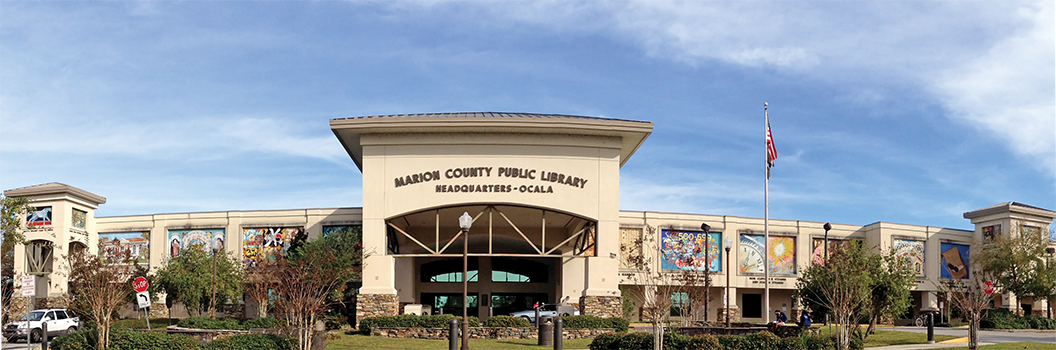
Marion County Public Library System headquarters

Three of the eight libraries in the Marion County Public Library System are located in Ocala.

== Transportation ==
=== Major roads ===
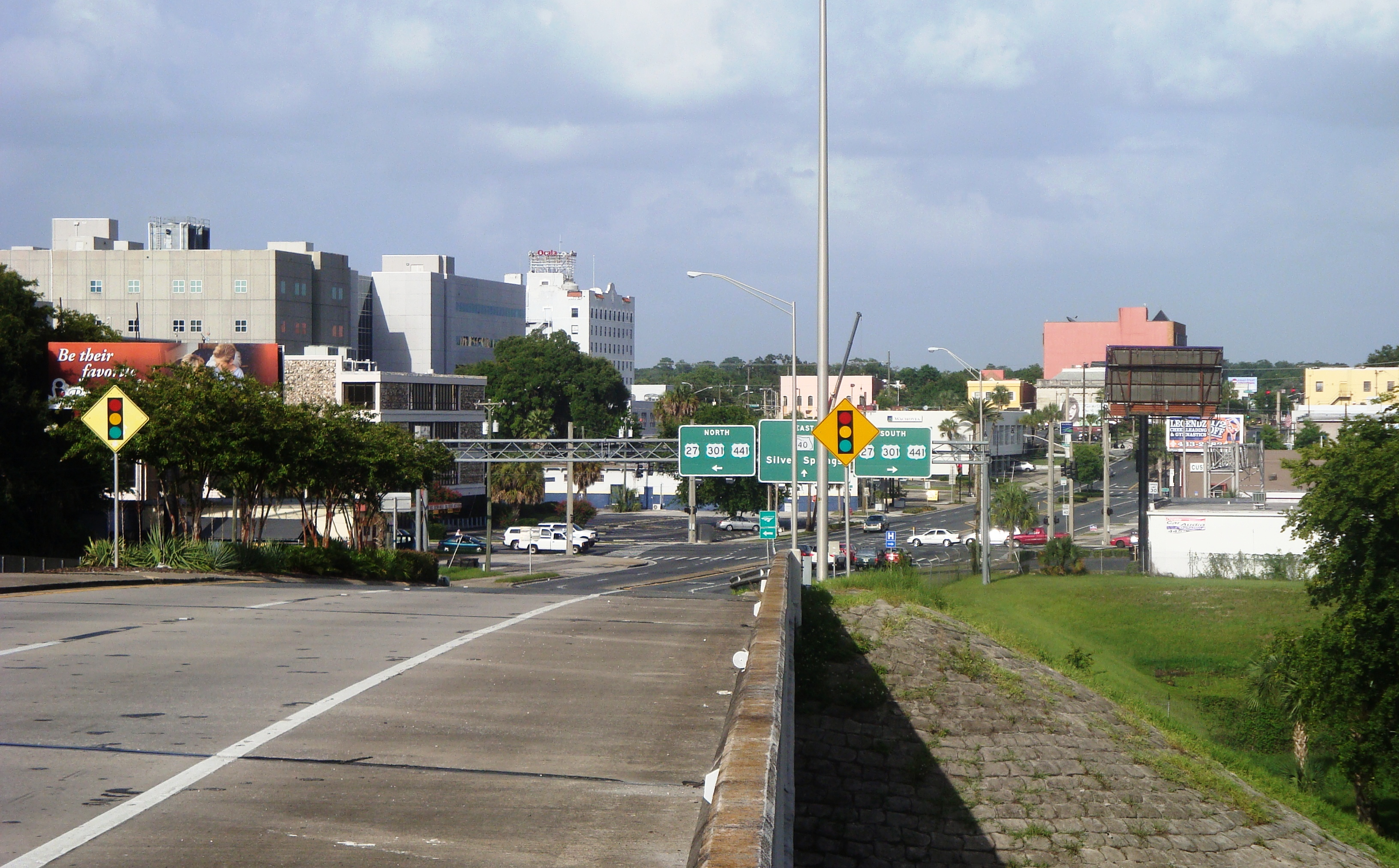
Eastbound SR 40 as it approaches US 27-301-441 in Ocala.

Several major highways pass through Ocala, including I-75, US 27, US 301, and US 441. Ocala was on the western leg of the historic Dixie Highway.

- I-75 (I-75) runs north and south across the western edge of the city, with interchanges at SR 200 (exit 350), SR 40 (exit 352), and US 27 (exit 354).
- US 27 runs north and south throughout Ocala. It is multiplexed with US 301 and 441 until it reaches SR 492(Northwest 10th Street), then makes a sharp turn onto NW 10th Street then curves northwest through Williston, Perry, Tallahassee, and beyond.
- US 301 is the main local north and south road through Ocala. It is multiplexed with US 27 until it reaches NW 10th Street, and with US 441 throughout the city.
- US 441 is the main local north and south road through Ocala. It is multiplexed with US 27 until it reaches NW 10th Street, and with US 301 throughout the city.
- SR 492 runs east and west through the northern part of the city from the northern terminus of the US 27 multiplex with US 301–441 to SR 40 just southwest of the Silver Springs city limit.
- SR 40 runs east and west through Ocala. It spans from Rainbow Lakes Estates through Ocala National Forest to Ormond Beach in Volusia County, although a bi-county extension exists, spanning from Yankeetown in Levy County to Dunnellon, south of the western terminus of SR 40.
- SR 464 runs east and west from SR 200 through the southeastern part of the city. Beyond the city limits, it continues southeast towards SR 35, and continues as CR 464.
- SR 200 runs northeast and southwest from Hernando in Citrus County through US 27-301-441 where it becomes a "hidden state road" along US 301 until it reaches Callahan, and is multiplexed with SR A1A into Fernandina Beach.

=== Airport, bus, and others ===
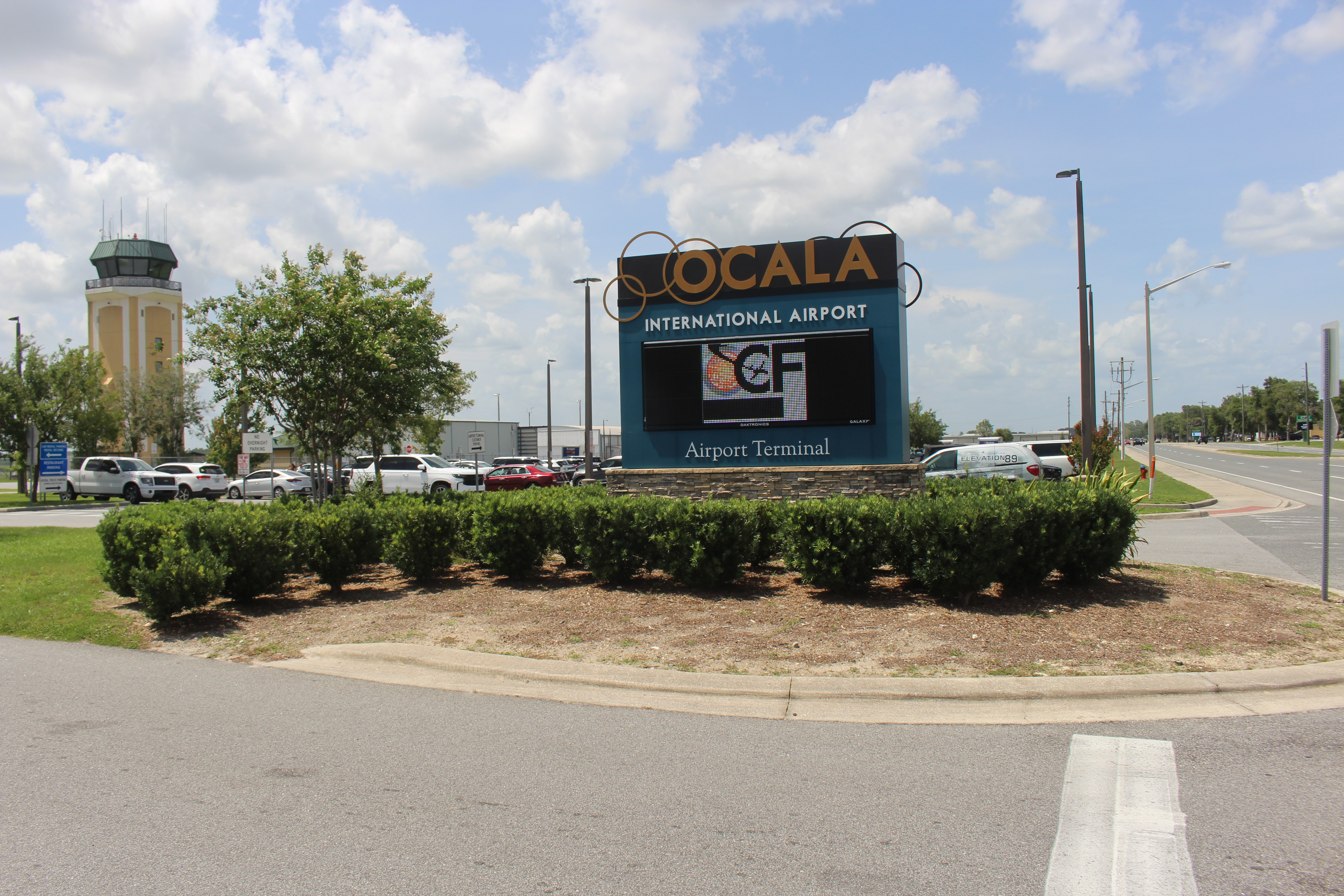
Ocala International Airport

Ocala International Airport provides general-aviation services to the community. Ocala Suntran provides bus service through select parts of the city. One of the major hubs for Suntran is the former Ocala Union Station, which served Amtrak trains until November 2004. Amtrak serves Ocala by bus connection to Jacksonville and Lakeland.

Ocala is also served by Greyhound Bus Lines. Marion Transit is the complementary ADA paratransit service for SunTran, the fixed route in the City of Ocala. Marion Transit was established in 1976, and operates paratransit buses providing public transportation throughout Marion County for the transportation of the disadvantaged population.

== Parks and recreation ==
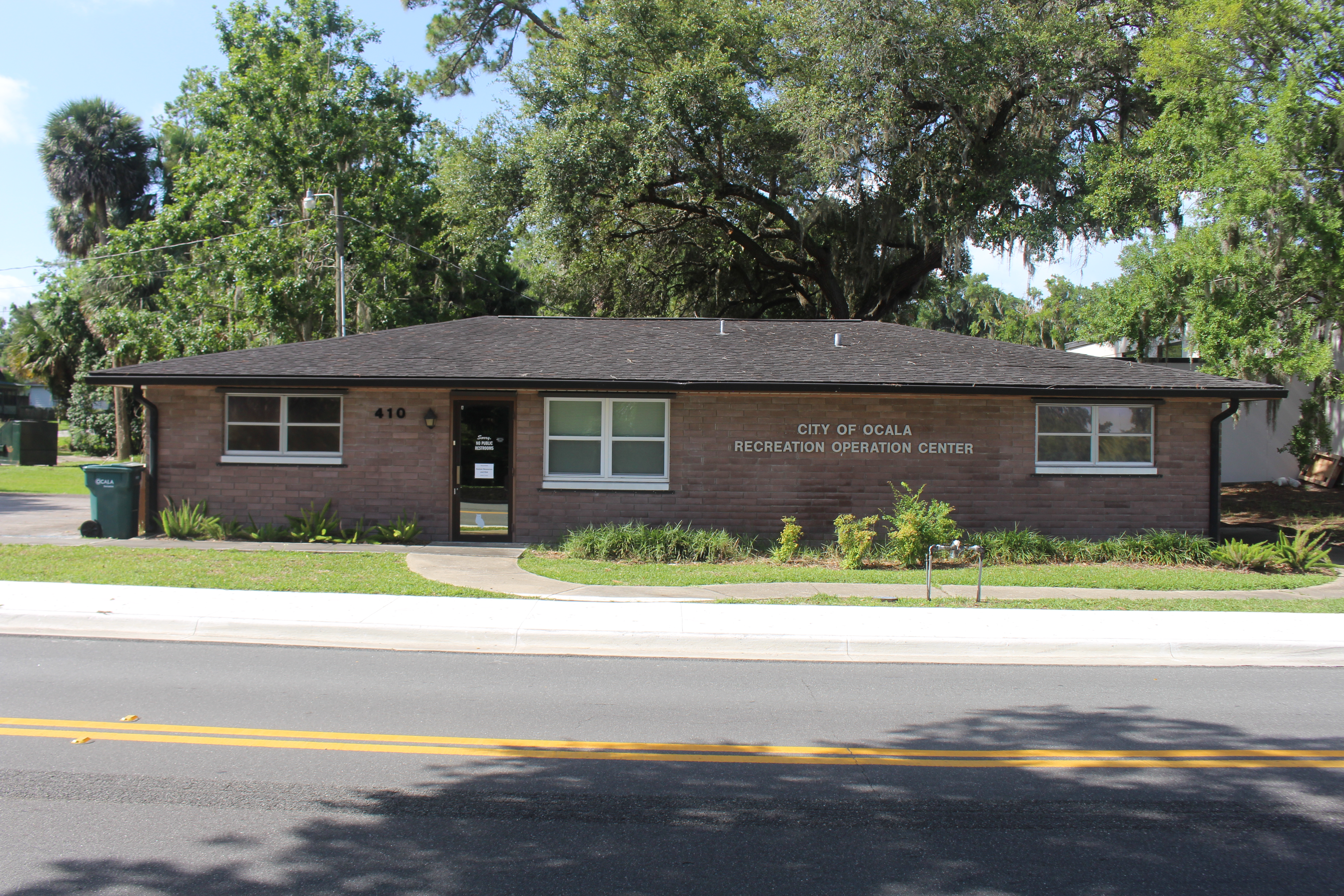
City of Ocala Recreation Operation Center

As of 2025 the city of Ocala has 43 park facilities.

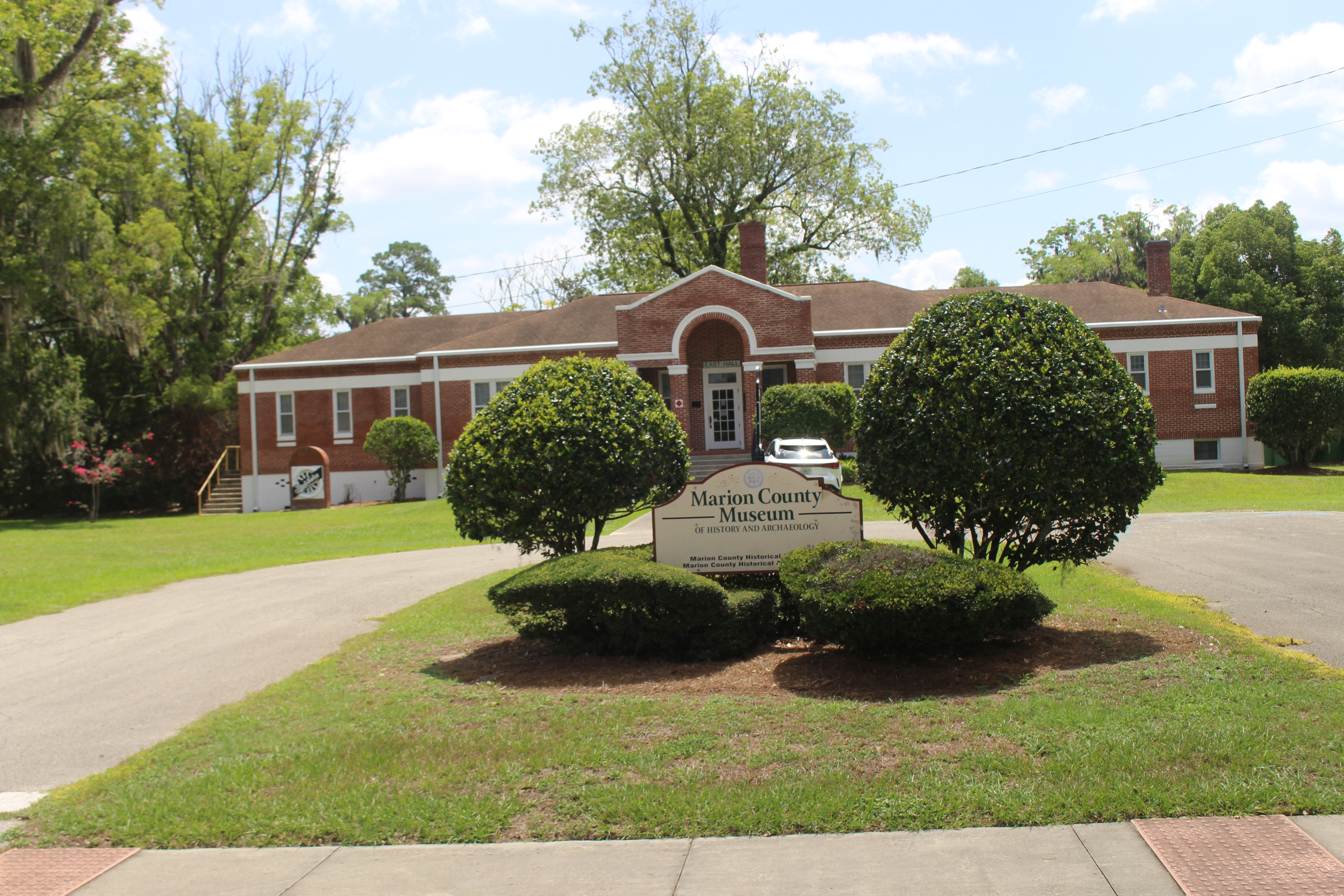
Marion County Museum of History

The Marion County Museum of History is located in Ocala. The current facility opened in 2011. The museum is a part of the McPherson Governmental Complex.

== Healthcare ==
Hospitals in Ocala include: AdventHealth Ocala, HCA Florida Ocala Hospital, and HCA Florida West Marion Hospital.

== Notable people ==
- Antonio Allen, NFL player
- Arthur I. Appleton, businessman, racehorse owner
- Elizabeth Ashley, actress
- Tony Beckham, NFL cornerback
- Thelma Berlack Boozer, journalist, publicist
- Brittany Bowe, Olympic speed skater
- Emery N. Brown, Anesthesiologist and Neuroscientist
- Farris Bryant, former Governor
- Daunte Culpepper, NFL quarterback
- James Dean, first African-American judge in Florida
- Caydee Denney, figure skater
- Haven Denney, figure skater
- Drayton Florence, NFL cornerback
- Dory Funk Jr., wrestler
- Don Garlits, drag racer
- Santana Garrett, wrestler
- Joey Gilmore, blues musician
- Troy Glaus, former Major League Baseball player
- Mitch Harris, Major League Baseball pitcher
- Josh Hart (racer), drag racer
- Erin Jackson, Olympic gold medalist speed skater
- Lee James, Olympic weightlifter 1976 silver medalist
- Val James, professional ice hockey player, first Black American player in the NHL
- Eddie Johnson, NBA basketball player
- Frank Johnson, NBA basketball player
- John R. MacDougall, broadcast hijacker best known for the Captain Midnight broadcast signal intrusion
- Buddy MacKay, former governor of Florida
- Travis Mays, NBA basketball player
- Jeremy McKinnon, musician
- Chris Meffert, politician
- James Melton, opera singer
- Eugene Milton, NFL football player
- Maxey Dell Moody, businessman
- Slomon Moody, physician and farmer
- Steve Morse, composer/guitarist
- Reid Nichols, Major League Baseball player
- Martha O'Driscoll, actress
- Patrick O'Neal, actor
- Ted Potter Jr., golfer
- Kelly Preston, actress
- Jason Schappert, flight instructor
- Leonora St. George Rogers Schuyler, socialite and clubwoman
- Elisa Rae Shupe, US Army sergeant, first in the US to obtain legal recognition of a non-binary gender
- Lamar Thomas, NFL player and commentator
- Mava Lee Thomas, All-American Girls Professional Baseball League player
- John Travolta, actor
- Jim Williams, former lieutenant governor of Florida
- P. J. Williams, NFL cornerback for the New Orleans Saints
- Walter Ray Williams Jr., PBA bowler
- Tyrone Young, NFL wide receiver

=== Notable musical groups ===
- A Day to Remember, pop-punk/metalcore band
- The Royal Guardsmen, band originating in the 1960s
- Seventh Star, Christian metalcore band
- Wage War, metalcore band
- Underoath, metalcore band

== Sister cities ==
Ocala has two sister cities:

- (Republic of Ireland) Newbridge, County Kildare, in Ireland (2008)
- Pisa and San Rossore in Italy (2004)

== See also ==
- Appleton Museum of Art
- Emergency Medical Services Alliance
- Jumbolair Airport
- List of sites and peoples visited by the Hernando de Soto Expedition
- Ocala National Forest
- Sholom Park
- Star–Banner
- United Hebrews of Ocala
