= List of county roads in Lake County, Florida =

- County road shields used in Florida

Highway names
- Interstates: Interstate X (I-X)
- US Highways: U.S. Highway X (US X)
- State: State Road X (SR X)
- County: County Road X (CR-X)

System links
- County roads in Florida; County roads in Lake County

The following is a list of county roads in Lake County, Florida. All county roads are maintained by the county in which they reside.

== County routes in Lake County ==
Number	Road Name(s)	Direction and Termini					Notes
CR 19A	Dora Avenue	S–N S–N S–N	CR Old 441 / CR 452 CR 44C / CR Old 441 CR 452	Tavares Mount Dora Eustis	US 441 (SR 500) US 441 (SR 500) / SR 19 SR 19	Eustis Eustis Eustis	Former SR 19A
CR 25		S–N	US 27 / US 441 (SR 25 / SR 500)	Lady Lake	CR 25	Marion County line north-northeast of Lady Lake	Former SR 25 and Old Hwy 441
CR 25A	Connell Road South Dixie Avenue	S–N S–N	US 27 (SR 25) / English Road US 27 / US 441 (SR 25 / SR 500)	Leesburg Leesburg	US 27 (SR 25) / Saxon Road US 27 / US 441 (SR 25 / SR 500)	Leesburg Fruitland Park	Former SR 25A
CR 33		S–N	SR 50	Mascotte	US 27 (SR 25)	South of Leesburg	Former SR 33
CR 42		W–E	CR 42	Marion County line west of Altoona	SR 44	East of Lake Mack–Forest Hills	Former SR 42
CR 44	Orange Avenue	W–E W–E	US 441 (SR 500) / Sleepy Hollow Road SR 19 / Orange Avenue	Leesburg Eustis	CR 44 SR 44	Eustis Eustis	Former SR 44 (US 441 (SR 500) to CR 452), SR 452A (CR 452 to SR 19), and SR 44A (CR 44A to East Orange Avenue); Main Street in Leesburg (former alignment of SR 44) and East Orange Avenue in Eustis (part of SR 44 until ca. 2005) are also inventoried by FDOT as CR 44, but are not signed as such)
CR 44 Leg A		W–E	CR 44 / Shady Acres Road	Leesburg	US 441 (SR 500) / SR 44	Leesburg	Former Old Hwy 441 and US 441
CR 44A	Thomas Avenue; Griffin Road Estes Road Rose Street; Lakeside Avenue; Cassady Street	W–E S–N W–E S–N	West Main Street CR 44 CR 44A / CR 44B	Leesburg Eustis Eustis	US 27 / US 441 (SR 25 / SR 500) / Griffin Road SR 44 SR 19 / Guerrant Street	Leesburg Eustis Southwest of Cassia Umatilla	Former SR 44A, which turned south on Thomas Avenue to end at Main Street (old SR 44) Former SR 44A Former SR 44A
CR 44B	Donnelly Street	S–N	CR Old 441 / Donnelly Street CR 44	Mount Dora	US 441 (SR 500) / SR 44 CR 44A / CR 44A	Mount Dora	Former SR 44B
CR 44C	Griffin Road Eudora Road	W–E S–N	CR 468 / Edgewood Road CR 19A / CR Old 441	Northwest of Leesburg Mount Dora	CR 44A / Thomas Avenue Old Mt. Dora Road	Leesburg Eustis	Former SR 44C
CR 46	East 1st Avenue	W–E	CR Old 441	Mount Dora	US 441 (SR 500) / SR 46	Mount Dora	Former SR 46
CR 46A		S–N	SR 429 / SR 46	East-northeast of Mount Plymouth	SR 44	North-northwest of Seminole Springs	Former SR 46A
CR 48	Duda Road	W–E W–E	CR 48 CR 561 / Florida Avenue	Sumter County line southwest of Okahumpka Astatula	SR 19 Jones Avenue	Howey-in-the-Hills South-southeast of Lake Jem	Former SR 48 Former SR 48
CR C50	North Sunset Avenue	S–N	SR 50 / Sunset Avenue	Mascotte	SR 33	Mascotte	Unsigned
CR Old 50	Washington Street; Old Highway 50; North Hancock Road Old Highway 50	W–E	US 27 (SR 25) CR 455	Minneola Montverde Junction	CR 455 SR 438	East-southeast of Reavill's Corner Orange County line in Oakland	Former SR 50; part of the Green Mountain Scenic Byway
CR 433		S–N	Orange County line	Rock Springs Run State Reserve east-southeast of Mount Plymouth	SR 46	East-northeast of Mount Plymouth	Former SR 433; unsigned
CR 435		S–N	CR 435	Orange County line south of Mount Plymouth	Sorrento Avenue	Mount Plymouth	Former SR 435
CR 437		S–N	Plymouth–Sorrento Road	Orange County line south of Sorrento	CR 44A / Milford Drive	West-southwest of Cassia	Former SR 437
CR 439		S–N	SR 44 / Riordan Road	North-northeast of Mount Dora	CR 42	Ocala National Forest east-southeast of Altoona	Former SR 439
CR Old 441	Highland Street; 5th Avenue; Old Highway 441; Alfred Street	S–N	CR 500A	Orange County line at Mount Dora	SR 19 / SR 500A	Tavares	Former SR 500A; former path of US 441
CR 445		S–N	SR 19	Ocala National Forest north of Pittman	CR 445A	Astor Park	Former SR 445; part of the Florida Black Bear Scenic Byway
CR 445A		S–N	SR 19 / Railroad Grade Road (NF 57)	Northeast of Camp Ocala	SR 40	Astor Park	Former SR 445A; part of the St. Johns and Lake Eustis Railway.
CR 448		W–E	SR 19 / North Eichelberger Road	Tavares	CR 448	Orange County line east of Lake Jem	Former SR 448
CR 448A		S–N	Unknown road	East of Astatula	CR 448	Southeast of Lake Jem	Former SR 448A
CR 449	Stewart Lane; Silver Lake Drive; North Silver Lake Rd	S–N; W–E	US 441 (SR 500) / SR 44 / Echo Drive	Leesburg	Morningside Drive / Silver Lake Drive	Silver Lake	Former SR 449;
CR 450	Ocala Street; Central Avenue; Collins Street East	W–E	CR 450	Marion County line west-northwest of Umatilla	CR 42	East-southeast of Altoona	Former SR 450
CR 450A		W–E	SR 19	Umatilla	CR 44A	East-northeast of Eustis Meadows	Former SR 450
CR 452	Dora Avenue; Lake Dora Drive; Lakeshore Drive	S–N S–N	CR 19A / CR Old 441 SR 19	Tavares Eustis	Lakeshore Drive CR 452	West of Mount Dora Marion County line north-northwest of Grand Island	Former SR 452 Former SR 452 and SR 44
CR 455	7th Street	S–N	SR 50 / Hartle Road	Castle Hill	SR 19	South-southeast of Orange Blossom	Former SR 455; part of the Green Mountain Scenic Byway
CR 460	Martin Luther King Jr Blvd	W–E	CR 466 / NE 90th Street	Lessburg	US 27 / US 441 (SR 25 / SR 500)	Leesburg	
CR 466		W–E	CR 466 / NE 90th Street	Sumter County line in Lady Lake	US 27 / US 441 (SR 25 / SR 500) / Lemon Street	Lady Lake	Former SR 466
CR 466A	Miller Boulevard; Miller Street Picciola Road	W–E S–N	CR 466A US 27 / US 441 (SR 25 / SR 500)	Sumter County line west of Fruitland Park Leesburg	US 27 / US 441 (SR 25 / SR 500) Picciola Road	Fruitland Park Picciola Island	Former SR 466A
CR 466B	Lake Unity Road	S–N	CR 466A	East of Fruitland Park	Eagles Nest Road	Northeast of Fruitland Park	Former SR 466B
CR 468	Willard Avenue; West Berckman Street; Rose Avenue	S–N	SR 44 / West Main Street	Leesburg	CR 466A / Rose Avenue	Fruitland Park	Former SR 468
CR 470		W–E	CR 470	Sumter County line southwest of Leesburg	CR 33 / CR 48	Okahumpka	Former SR 470
CR 473	Creek Road	S–N	US 441 (SR 500) / SR 44 / Bluegill Drive	Leesburg	CR 44	Northeast of Orange Bend	Former SR 473
CR 474		W–E	SR 33	South of Groveland	US 27 (SR 25)	Four Corners	Former SR 474
CR 478	Cherry Lake Road	W–E	SR 19	North of Groveland	Cherry Lake Road	North-northeast of Groveland	Former SR 478
CR 561	Minnehaha Avenue; 12th Street; Broad Street; East Avenue; Lake Minneola Drive; Main Avenue; Claude Pepper Memorial Highway	S–N	SR 33	South of Groveland	SR 19	Tavares	Former SR 561 and SR 561A (which was CR 561A until ca. 2000); route through Clermont used to be more direct, but has since been closed.
CR 561A	Trousdale Street; 3rd Avenue	W–E	CR 561 CR 455	North-northwest of Minneola Ferndale	CR 455 CR 455	Ferndale Ferndale	Former SR 561A
CR 561B	Bronson Rd	W–E	CR 561	South-southwest of Clermont	Lakeshore Dr	Clermont Clermont	Former SR 561B
CR 565	Bay Lake Road Villa City Road	S–N S–N	South Bay Lake Road / General James A. Van Fleet State Trail SR 50 / Mount Pleasant Road	Withlacoochee State Forest south-southwest of Groveland Groveland	SR 50 / North Bay Lake Avenue US 27 (SR 25)	Mascotte North of Groveland	Former SR 565 gap at SR 50 between Mascotte and Groveland
CR 565A	Montevista Road Eagles Crossing Road	S–N S–N	CR 565B SR 50 / Government Estates Road	Southwest of Clermont Groveland	SR 50 CR 561	Groveland East-northeast of Groveland	Former SR 565A
CR 565B	Pine Island Road	W–E	SR 33	South of Groveland	CR 561 / Log House Road	South-southwest of Clermont	Former SR 565B
CR 567	Bridges Road	W–E	CR 33 / Austin Merritt Road	South of Okahumpka	US 27 (SR 25)	South-southeast of Okahumpka	Former SR 567
