= Florida's 11th congressional district =

U.S. House district for Florida

Coordinates: 28°51′31″N 82°14′29″W

- Map of district boundaries
- Representative: Daniel Webster; R–Clermont
- Area: 2,888 mi^{2} (7,480 km^{2})
- Distribution: 75.19% urban; 24.81% rural
- Population (2025): 922,602
- Median household income: $87,836
- Ethnicity: 59.4% White; 19.3% Hispanic; 11.7% Black; 4.5% Two or more races; 3.9% Asian; 1.2% other
- Cook PVI: R+7

Florida's 11th congressional district is a congressional district in the U.S. state of Florida. It includes Sumter County, home to The Villages, and parts of Lake, Orange, and Polk counties. In the 2020 redistricting cycle, the district was moved out of its coastal counties and into Orlando's western suburbs.

From 1993 to 2013, the former 11th district had encompassed most of the city of Tampa and its suburbs and the shoreline of southeastern Hillsborough County. It also included two areas in other counties: urban neighborhoods of south St. Petersburg in Pinellas County and neighborhoods in and around Bradenton in Manatee County. Most of that district is now the 14th district, while the current 11th is the successor of the old 5th district.

From 2013 to 2017 as well as its next iteration from 2017 to 2023, the district included Sumter County, Citrus County, Hernando and central Marion County, as well as northern Lake County. It also included southern Ocala, Bushnell, and Spring Hill. The Villages, a large retirement and golfing community for seniors, is situated in this district, aiding Republican candidates in the district and statewide.

Since the redistricting for the 2022 elections, the district includes Bay Lake, home to all four theme parks of Walt Disney World.

The district is currently represented by Republican Daniel Webster.

== Composition ==
For the 118th and successive Congresses (based on redistricting following the 2020 census), the district contains all or portions of the following counties and communities:

Lake County (17)

Astatula, Clermont, Ferndale, Four Corners (part; also 9th; shared with Orange, Osceola, and Polk counties), Fruitland Park, Groveland, Howey-in-the-Hills, Leesburg, Mascotte, Minneola, Montverde, Mount Plymouth (part; also 6th), Okahumpka, Silver Lake, Sorrento (part; also 6th), Tavares, Yalaha

Orange County (20)

Apopka, Bay Hill, Bay Lake, Clarcona, Doctor Phillips (part; also 10th), Four Corners (part; also 9th; shared with Lake, Osceola, and Polk counties), Horizon West, Lake Buena Vista, Oakland, Gotha, Lake Butler, Ocoee, Paradise Heights, Pine Hills (part; also 10th), South Apopka, Tangerine, Tildenville, Windermere, Winter Garden, Zellwood

Polk County (2)

Four Corners (part; also 9th; shared with Lake, Orange, and Osceola counties), Polk City

Sumter County (7)

All 7 communities

== List of members representing the district ==
Representative	Party	Years	Cong ress	Electoral history	
District created January 3, 1963
Edward Gurney (Winter Park)	Republican	January 3, 1963 – January 3, 1967	88th 89th	Elected in 1962. Re-elected in 1964. Redistricted to the 5th district.	
Claude Pepper (Miami)	Democratic	January 3, 1967 – January 3, 1973	90th 91st 92nd	Redistricted from the 3rd district and re-elected in 1966. Re-elected in 1968. Re-elected in 1970. Redistricted to the 14th district.	
Paul Rogers (West Palm Beach)	Democratic	January 3, 1973 – January 3, 1979	93rd 94th 95th	Redistricted from the 9th district and re-elected in 1972. Re-elected in 1974. Re-elected in 1976. Retired.	
Dan Mica (West Palm Beach)	Democratic	January 3, 1979 – January 3, 1983	96th 97th	Elected in 1978. Re-elected in 1980. Redistricted to the 14th district.	
Bill Nelson (Melbourne)	Democratic	January 3, 1983 – January 3, 1991	98th 99th 100th 101st	Redistricted from the 9th district and re-elected in 1982. Re-elected in 1984. Re-elected in 1986. Re-elected in 1988. Retired to run for Governor of Florida.	
Jim Bacchus (Miami Beach)	Democratic	January 3, 1991 – January 3, 1993	102nd	Elected in 1990. Redistricted to the 15th district.	
Sam Gibbons (Tampa)	Democratic	January 3, 1993 – January 3, 1997	103rd 104th	Redistricted from the 7th district and re-elected in 1992. Re-elected in 1994. Retired.	1993–2003 [data missing]
Jim Davis (Tampa)	Democratic	January 3, 1997 – January 3, 2007	105th 106th 107th 108th 109th	Elected in 1996. Re-elected in 1998. Re-elected in 2000. Re-elected in 2002. Re-elected in 2004. Retired to run for Governor of Florida.	1993–2003 [data missing]
Jim Davis (Tampa)	Democratic	January 3, 1997 – January 3, 2007	105th 106th 107th 108th 109th	Elected in 1996. Re-elected in 1998. Re-elected in 2000. Re-elected in 2002. Re-elected in 2004. Retired to run for Governor of Florida.	2003–2013
Kathy Castor (Tampa)	Democratic	January 3, 2007 – January 3, 2013	110th 111th 112th	Elected in 2006. Re-elected in 2008. Re-elected in 2010. Redistricted to the 14th district.	2003–2013
Rich Nugent (Spring Hill)	Republican	January 3, 2013 – January 3, 2017	113th 114th	Redistricted from the 5th district and re-elected in 2012. Re-elected in 2014. Retired.	2013–2017
Daniel Webster (Clermont)	Republican	January 3, 2017 – present	115th 116th 117th 118th 119th	Redistricted from the 10th district and re-elected in 2016. Re-elected in 2018. Re-elected in 2020. Re-elected in 2022. Re-elected in 2024. Retiring	2017–2023
Daniel Webster (Clermont)	Republican	January 3, 2017 – present	115th 116th 117th 118th 119th	Redistricted from the 10th district and re-elected in 2016. Re-elected in 2018. Re-elected in 2020. Re-elected in 2022. Re-elected in 2024. Retiring	2023–2027
Joe Strada (Lake Mary)	Republican	Assuming office on January 3, 2027		Elected in 2026.	2023–2027

== Recent election results from statewide races ==
Year	Office	Results
2008	President	McCain 55% - 44%
2010	Senate	Rubio 59% - 18%
2010	Governor	Scott 58% - 42%
2010	Attorney General	Bondi 61% - 33%
2010	Chief Financial Officer	Atwater 61% - 30%
2012	President	Romney 58% - 42%
2012	Senate	Mack IV 50.3% - 49.7%
2014	Governor	Scott 60% - 40%
2016	President	Trump 56% - 41%
2016	Senate	Rubio 58% - 38%
2018	Senate	Scott 57% - 43%
2018	Governor	DeSantis 56% - 43%
2018	Attorney General	Moody 59% - 39%
2018	Chief Financial Officer	Patronis 59% - 41%
2020	President	Trump 55% - 44%
2022	Senate	Rubio 61% - 38%
2022	Governor	DeSantis 63% - 37%
2022	Attorney General	Moody 65% - 35%
2022	Chief Financial Officer	Patronis 63% - 37%
2024	President	Trump 58% - 41%
2024	Senate	Scott 58% - 41%

== Election results ==
=== 2002 ===
Florida's 11th Congressional District Election (2002)
Party	Candidate	Votes	%
Democratic	Jim Davis*		100.00
Total votes			100.00
Turnout			
Democratic hold			

=== 2004 ===
Florida's 11th Congressional District Election (2004)
Party	Candidate	Votes	%
Democratic	Jim Davis*	191,780	85.82
Libertarian	Robert Edward Johnson	31,579	14.13
Socialist Workers	Karl M. Butts	122	0.06
Total votes		223,481	100.00
Turnout			
Democratic hold			

=== 2006 ===
Florida's 11th Congressional District Election (2006)
Party	Candidate	Votes	%
Democratic	Kathy Castor	97,470	69.65
Republican	Eddie Adams, Jr.	42,454	30.34
No party	Others	18	0.01
Total votes		139,942	100.00
Turnout			
Democratic hold			

=== 2008 ===
Florida's 11th Congressional District Election (2008)
Party	Candidate	Votes	%
Democratic	Kathy Castor*	184,106	71.66
Republican	Eddie Adams, Jr.	72,825	28.34
Total votes		256,931	100.00
Turnout			
Democratic hold			

=== 2010 ===
Florida's 11th Congressional District Election (2010)
Party	Candidate	Votes	%
Democratic	Kathy Castor*	91,328	59.64
Republican	Mike Pendergast	61,817	40.36
Total votes		153,145	100.00
Turnout			
Democratic hold			

=== 2016 ===
Florida's 11th Congressional District Election (2016)
Party	Candidate	Votes	%
Republican	Daniel Webster	258,016	65.4
Democratic	Dave Koller	124,713	31.6
None	Bruce Ray Riggs	11,990	3.0
Total votes		394,719	100.00
Republican hold			

=== 2018 ===
Florida's 11th Congressional District Election (2018)
Party	Candidate	Votes	%
Republican	Daniel Webster (incumbent)	239,395	65.2
Democratic	Dana Cottrell	128,053	34.8
Independent	Luis Saldana (write-in)	58	0.0
Total votes		367,506	100.00
Republican hold			

=== 2020 ===
2020 United States House of Representatives elections in Florida
Party	Candidate	Votes	%
Republican	Daniel Webster (incumbent)	316,979	66.72%
Democratic	Dana Cottrell	158,094	33.27%
Total votes		475,073	100.0
Republican hold			

=== 2022 ===
2022 United States House of Representatives elections in Florida
Party	Candidate	Votes	%
Republican	Daniel Webster (incumbent)	205,995	63.07%
Democratic	Shante Munns	115,647	35.41%
Independent	Kevin Porter	4,967	1.52%
Total votes		326,609	100.0
Republican hold			

=== 2024 ===
2024 United States House of Representatives elections in Florida
Party	Candidate	Votes	%
Republican	Daniel Webster (incumbent)	269,277	60.38%
Democratic	Barbie Harden Hall	176,726	39.62%
Total votes		446,003	100.0
Republican hold			
