= LakeXpress =

Public transit agency in Lake County, FL

- Founded: 2007
- Headquarters: 1300 S. Duncan Drive
- Locale: Tavares, Florida
- Service area: Lake County, Florida
- Service type: bus service
- Routes: 9
- Fuel type: Diesel
- Operator: RATP Dev
- Website: ridelakexpress.com

LakeXpress (officially the Lake County Office of Transit Services) is a public transportation agency in Lake County, Florida. The agency operates fixed-route service throughout the county, and it also provides paratransit under the name Lake County Connection.

The service was instituted in 2007 to relieve traffic congestion along U.S. Route 441. Buses originally used a flag stop system that allowed buses to stop at any point on the route, but this was replaced with designated stops once ridership patterns had been determined.

== Routes ==
LakeXpress consists of nine bus routes, which operate Monday through Friday. Three routes connect to LYNX, the transit system serving nearby Orange and Osceola Counties.

#	Route	Other cities served	Headway	Notes
1	Leesburg to Eustis via US 441	Tavares	1 hour	
1A	The Villages to Leesburg via US 27/US 441	Fruitland Park	1 hour	
2	Leesburg Circulator		1 hour	
3	Mount Dora Circulator	Eustis	1 hour	
4	Umatilla to Zellwood via SR 19/US 441	Eustis and Mount Dora	2 hours	Some buses extend further north to Altoona; Connects to LYNX route 44 in Zellwood
27 Xpress	Leesburg to Clermont via US 27	Groveland and Minneola	1 hour	Morning and evening service only
50	Mascotte to Winter Garden via SR 50	Groveland and Clermont	1 hour	Connects to LYNX route 105 in Winter Garden
55	Four Corners to US 192		30 mins.	Morning and evening service only Connects to LYNX route 55 on US 192
South; Lake; Xpress	Clermont to Four Corners via US 27		1 hour	Morning and evening service only
