= Florida State Road 19 =

Highway in Florida, US

State Road 19
- SR 19 highlighted in red

Route information
- Maintained by FDOT
- Length: 88.955 mi (143.159 km)

Major junctions
- South end: SR 33 / SR 50 in Groveland
- US 441 in Tavares; CR 44 in Eustis; SR 40 in Ocala NF
- North end: US 17 in Palatka

Location
- Country: United States
- State: Florida
- Counties: Lake, Marion, Putnam

Highway system
- Florida State Highway System; Interstate; US; State; Former; Pre‑1945; Toll; Scenic
← US 19	→ SR 20

State Road 19 (SR 19) is a Florida State Road in Putnam, Marion, and Lake counties. It runs from Groveland to Palatka through Ocala National Forest. Along with SR 33, SR 19 provides a mostly rural north-south corridor through central Florida from Lakeland to Palatka.

== Route description ==
=== Groveland to Tavares ===
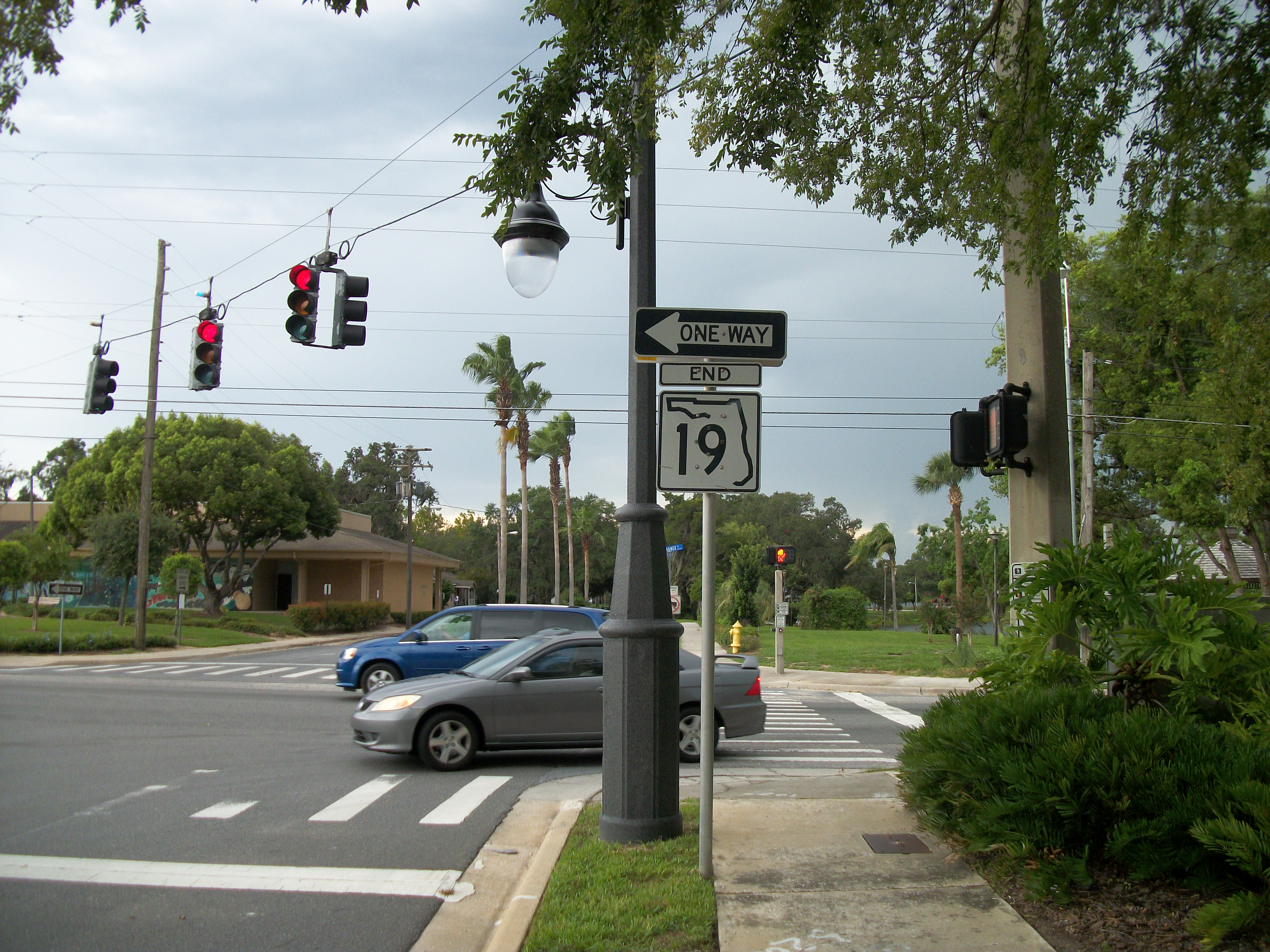
Southern terminus of SR 19 in Groveland

State Road 19 begins in Groveland at State Road 50 just west of the northern terminus of State Road 33, where SR 33 becomes a hidden state route concurrent with westbound SR 50 until it reaches Mascotte and becomes a county road. SR 19 runs 6 miles (9.7 km) to the north and curves to the northeast before encountering a parclo interchange with US 27. The southbound on-off ramps lead directly to the southbound interchange with Florida's Turnpike. Later the road curves from northeast to northwest at the intersection of County Road 455 and then back to north at Quiet Cove Road before reaching Howey-in-the-Hills, where it adopts the name Palm Avenue. Here SR 19 meets the intersection of Revels Road and East Revels Road, the former of which is an insignificant dirt road, while the latter is a road that leads to the coast of Little Lake Harris. SR 19 then makes another right curve where it passes Taylor Memorial Cemetery and curves back north as it approaches the heart of town. The first site it approaches as it curves north is the Howey Academy on the southeast corner of South Palm Avenue and East Lakeview Avenue. The next major intersection is a blinker light at Central Avenue, which is near the local library and police station. Here, South Palm Avenue becomes North Paim Avenue, and West Central Boulevard becomes East Central Boulevard. After passing Citrus Avenue, and the historic Howey Mansion as it curves northwest, SR 19 serves as the eastern terminus of Former SR 48 and then turns right to cross over the Lake Harris Bridge, which divides Lake Harris from Little Lake Harris. From there, the road officially enters the Tavares City Limits, but the land surrounding the road doesn't. Along the way, SR 19 intersects such roads as County Road 448/North Eichelberger Road then becomes a four-lane divided highway where it serves as the northern terminus of County Road 561. From here the road runs along an abandoned railroad line that previously ran along CR 561, but both SR 19 and that former railroad line run along the west coast of Lake Dora.

By the time Tavares' territory is more spread out and includes more than just SR 19, it crosses a bridge over the Dead River just before the intersection with County Road 452 (West Main Street). CR 452 secretly joins SR 19 in a concurrency. The intersection of County Road Old 441 contains a rail trail on the south side, and serves as part of a wye intersection where northbound SR 19 joins southbound US 441 and eastbound SR 44 through the rest of Tavares where CR 452 branches off onto Lake Eustis Drive while US 441-SR 19-44 cross a bridge over Lake Juniata. Between Mount Homer Road and David Walker Drive, the triplex crosses into Eustis until it encounters an interchange where part of CR 19A terminates. US 441-SR 44 continue eastward, while SR 19 turns north at this interchange.

=== North of Tavares thru Ocala National Forest ===
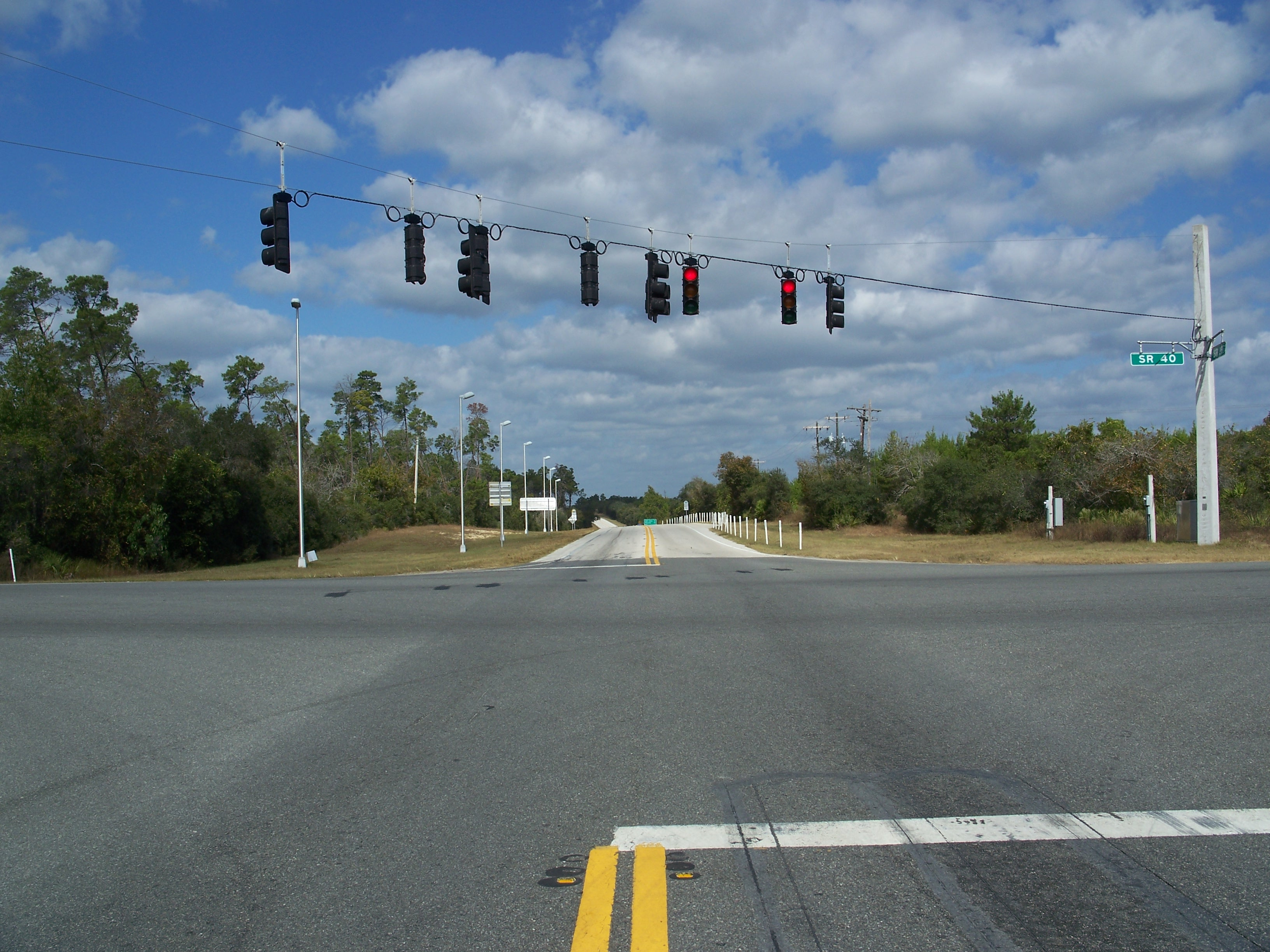
Looking north across the SR 40 intersection

Within Downtown Eustis, the SR 19 splits onto two separate one-way streets, Northbound SR 19 shifts onto Grove Street, while southbound SR 19 remains on Bay Street. Both the northbound and southbound segments are part of the Eustis Commercial Historic District. This split terminates just north of Laurel Oak Drive, and the road becomes a divided highway once again, with the first intersection being another segment of County Road 452. Here the road runs along the west side of Trout Lake for a short distance and well after that intersects CR 44A. The road remains 4 lanes wide through Dona Vista and then curves northeast where it crosses Lake Umatilla in Umatilla and the becomes a two lane highway at the south end of the concurrency with County Road 450 (West Ocala Street). An unusual note is that railroad tracks used to run down the median of the four lane road between the Florida's Favorite Orange Juice plant on the south side of Umatilla to the point where the road becomes two lanes. Here the old grade crossed the intersection and can be observed to the east of the two lane road. This passes the old depot which is now a library. Umatilla Boulevard begins on the northwest corner of this intersection and runs parallel to SR 19 until it reaches Lake Street. The right of way for a separate northbound lane utilizing the old railroad grade is clear evidence for a proposed widening of SR 19, with the grade being adjact to the highway to just south of Altoona where the grade diverges to the west. The concurrency ends at East Collins Street where CR 450 continues east and SR 19 continues north.

Even as it passes along the west side of Lake Pearl, the old railway grade right of way can be found until it finally diverges from SR 19 just south of Pittman. One clear sign the road is approaching Ocala National Forest is the U.S. Forest Services Ranger Station on the opposite side of the road. Immediately the road runs along the west side of Lake Gibson as the right-of-way for the northbound lane ends and one for a southbound lane begins. Along some tree farms, SR 19 crosses over from Umatilla to Altoona. In downtown Altoona, SR 19 intersects Former SR 42, and more than a dozen blocks later the road becomes a spur of the Florida Black Bear Scenic Byway as it officially enters Ocala National Forest. The first segment of the forest is the Lake Dorr Recreational Area in Pittman. Within this area is the Pittman Visitor Center. Further north, a dirt road runs northeast before SR 19 serves as the western terminus of County Road 445. Later National Forest Service Road 573 intersects the road at a northwest to southeast angle. SR 19 curves northeast again and then northwest as it approaches Sellers Lake and the intersection of County Road 445A near Astor Park, the last major intersection in Lake County. Soon enough, it passes the Beakman Lake Recreational Area, but beyond that point the rest of the surroundings consist of purely wilderness and occasional intersections with NFS dirt roads, as well as the U.S. Navy's Pinecastle Bombing Range. The road crosses the Lake-Marion County Line and serves as the southern terminus of the Backwoods Trail before intersecting SR 40 northwest of Wildcat Lake.

=== Marion County to Palatka ===
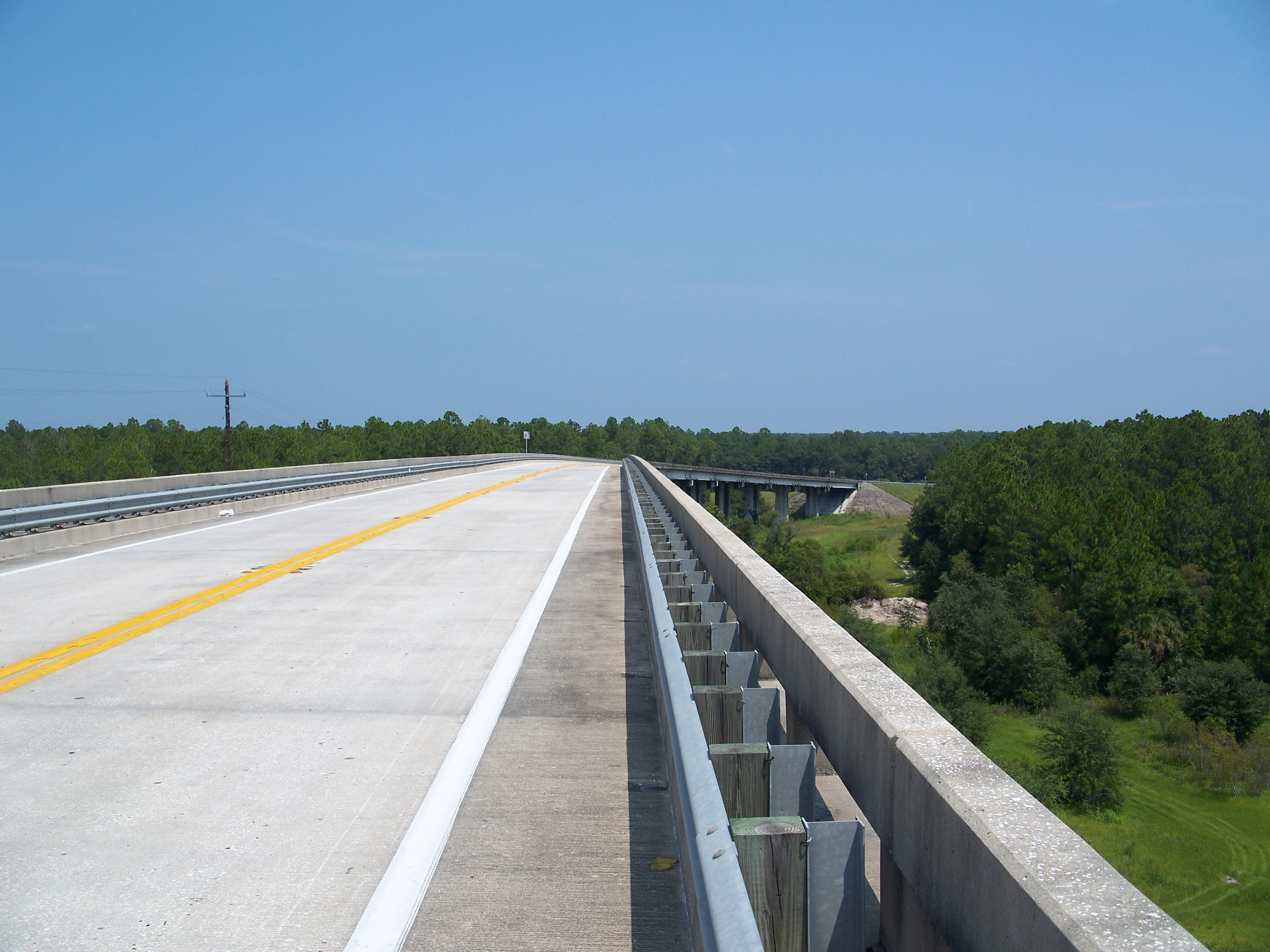
SR 19 over the Cross Florida Barge Canal, looking north

Continuing north of SR 40, the road takes a brief easterly turn where it crosses a bridge over Juniper Creek, but then turns north again to dominate the western shores of Lake George, which is part of the St. Johns River. From here it turns northwest, until it briefly becomes a two-lane divided highway at the intersection of County Road 314 (Salt Springs Highway) in Salt Springs, and then turns straight north again where it later intersects County Road 316 and Northeast 142nd Place Road. A frontage road can be found on the southwest corner of SR 19 and CR 316. After this intersection the road crosses the Marion-Putnam County Line. Somewhere north of here, deep within the forest, Backwoods Trail moves onto a National Forest Road, but the Black Bear Scenic Byway continues its concurrency with SR 19. Further north it runs along a bridge that crosses the Ocklawaha River and 3 miles (4.8 km) north of that bridge, the road climbs an embankment for a higher bridge over the Cross Florida Barge Canal. Upon descending the top of this bridge the road intersects CR 310 which secretly joins SR 19 as it turns northeast, leaving Ocala National Forest. Despite leaving Ocala National Forest, the area surrounding SR 19 remains mostly forest land for another 5 miles (8.0 km). After crossing the right-of-way for a series of power lines, the forest thins out as road turns north momentarily then curves to the northeast again. Near Mud Lake, the road crosses the five-way intersection of Silver Lake Boulevard and Round Lake Road, CR 310 branches off to the southeast and Round Lake Road branches off to the north.

North of West Rellim Drive, the right-of-way for new eastbound lanes are exposed, then widens to a divided highway near the Palatka City Limits in the vicinity of the local Wal-Mart Supercenter. After the intersection of South Moody Road, SR 19 curves slightly north and SR 20 (Crill Avenue) is the first major intersection in Palatka. The road crosses two other intersections before reaching the Palatka Mall and descending slightly toward SR 100 (Reid Street). This is the last major intersection along SR 19, and all others north of here are side streets. After a slight curve to the right, it becomes easy to see the Seminole Electric Power Plant further to the north. As it passes by the Putnam County Sheriff's Office, and runs along the north side of an athletic field, SR 19 finally ends at the intersection of U.S. 17, which contains controlled ramps within the divider.

== History ==
State Road 19 initially followed what is now mostly County Road 561 south to SR 50 (now CR Old 50) in Minneola. The current alignment of SR 19 south of Howey-in-the-Hills was State Road 459.

The segment north of the intersection with Silver Lake Road near Palatka was once part of the Ocklawaha Valley Railroad.

Until sometime in the 2010s, SR 19 shared a one block concurrency with westbound Former SR 42 in downtown Altoona.

== Major intersections ==
County	Location	mi	km	Destinations	Notes
Lake	Groveland	0.000	0.000	SR 33 south / SR 50 east (West Orange Street) – Clermont	
Lake	Groveland	0.053	0.085	CR 33 north / SR 50 west (West Broad Street) – Mascotte	
Lake	Groveland	1.974	3.177	CR 478 east (Cherry Lake Road)	
Lake	Groveland	6.68	10.75	US 27 (SR 25) / Florida's Turnpike (SR 91) – Clermont, Leesburg	interchange; Turnpike exit 285
Lake		9.435	15.184	CR 455 south – Montverde	
Lake	Howey-in-the-Hills	13.350	21.485	CR 48 west – Okahumpka	
Lake		14.275– 14.868	22.973– 23.928	Howey Bridge over Little Lake Harris	
Lake	Tavares	16.664	26.818	CR 448 east – Lake Idamere Park	
Lake	Tavares	18.110	29.145	CR 561 south – Astatula	
Lake	Tavares	19.849	31.944	SR 500A north / CR Old 441 south – Leesburg, Mount Dora, Business District, Lake-Sumter State College	
Lake	Tavares	20.085	32.324	US 441 north (SR 500) to SR 44 west – Leesburg	south end of US 441 / SR 500 overlap
Lake	Eustis	23.232	37.388	CR 19A south (Plaza Drive)	
Lake	Eustis	23.53	37.87	US 441 south (SR 500) / CR 19A south – Mt. Dora, Apopka, Orlando	interchange; north end of US 441 / SR 500 overlap
Lake	Eustis	25.707	41.371	To SR 44 east / Orange Avenue – DeLand	former SR 44 east
Lake	Eustis	26.615	42.833	CR 452 north	
Lake	Eustis	27.354	44.022	CR 44 – DeLand, Orlando, Leesburg, Lake County Fair Grounds, bypass to SR 44 east / US 441 south	
Lake	Eustis	27.927	44.944	CR 19A south	
Lake	Umatilla	30.161	48.539	CR 450A east	
Lake	Umatilla	31.534	50.749	CR 450 west (Ocala Street) – Florida Elks Youth Camp	south end of CR 450 overlap
Lake	Umatilla	31.796	51.171	CR 450 east (Collins Street East)	north end of CR 450 overlap
Lake	Altoona	34.229	55.086	CR 42 – Weirsdale, Paisley, DeLand	
Lake	Ocala NF	39.387	63.387	CR 445 north – Alexander Springs	
Lake	Ocala NF	44.915	72.284	CR 445A north	
Marion	Ocala NF	48.783	78.509	SR 40 – Ocala, Ormond Beach	
Marion	Salt Springs	64.279	103.447	CR 314 west – Ocala, Hunter Ed. Center and Youth Camp	
Marion	Ocala NF	65.241	104.995	CR 316 west / FR 29 (Northeast 142nd Place Road) – Fort McCoy, Fort Gates Ferry	
Putnam		77.114– 77.621	124.103– 124.919	Bridge over Cross Florida Barge Canal	
Putnam	Rodman	77.821	125.241	CR 310 west	
Putnam	Palatka	86.686	139.508	SR 20 (Crill Avenue) – Interlachen, Palatka, Ravine Gardens State Park	
Putnam	Palatka	87.926	141.503	SR 100 – Keystone Heights, Palatka, Airport	
Putnam	Palatka	88.955	143.159	US 17 (SR 15) – Green Cove Springs, East Palatka	
1.000 mi = 1.609 km; 1.000 km = 0.621 mi: Concurrency terminus

== Related routes ==
State Road 19 has two county suffixed routes, both of which are in Lake County

=== County Road 19A: Tavares-Mount Dora ===
County Road 19A
- Location: Tavares-Mount Dora

County Road 19A is a county suffixed alternate route of State Road 19 between Tavares and western Mount Dora in Lake County in Florida, although neither of the termini is SR 19. The road begins at County Road Old 441, as Dora Avenue, which also runs south as a city street to County Road 452. North of CR Old 441, it shift further and further into a northeasterly direction. Skirting the border of Eustis, it makes a sharp left turn at Kurt Street. However, that designation is short-lived, because it turns right to briefly join U.S. Route 441-State Road 19-State Road 44 just west of the partial cloverleaf interchange where SR 19 breaks away from that multiplex. SR 19 turns north, while CR 19A turns south.

Though incorrectly listed on Google Maps as being part of Old 441, the segment south of US 441-SRs 19/44 is strictly part of CR 19A. After the intersection with Bay Road, CR 19A makes a curve to the east and ends at a convoluted intersection with both CR Old 441 and CR 44C in Mount Dora.

=== County Road 19A: Eustis ===
County Road 19A
- Location: Eustis

The second County Road 19A is a county suffixed alternate route of State Road 19 in Eustis in Lake County in Florida. It runs straight north and south from CR 452 in the south, crosses County Road 44 and then turns at a southwest to northeast angle where it ends at State Road 19 in the north.
