= Bassville Park, Florida =

Coordinates: 28°50′26″N 81°46′07″W

Bassville Park was a census-designated place (CDP) in the U.S. state of Florida. It is located in Lake County, north of Lake Harris and west of Lake Eustis.

County Road 473 is the main road passing through this region and is located at latitude 28.841 and longitude -81.769
