= Lillian Vickers-Smith =

American newspaper sports editor (1896–1971)

- Born: Lillian Dyer; September 7, 1896; Rutland, Vermont
- Died: July 4, 1971 (aged 74); Asheville, North Carolina
- Occupations: Newspaper sports editor, journalist
- Spouse: Ormond Vickers-Smith
- Children: 3

Lillian Vickers-Smith (née Dyer; September 7, 1896 – July 4, 1971) was an American journalist who is regarded as the first woman sports editor for a newspaper when she obtained the title working for The Leesburg Commercial in Florida in 1938.

== Early life ==
She was born Lillian Dyer to parents Horace E. Dyer and Lillian G. Hasler in Rutland, Vermont on September 7, 1896.

== Career ==
In Florida, she began her writing career. Lillian Vickers-Smith first began serving as Press Correspondent for the town of Fruitland Park, Florida after news writing with the Fruitland Park Chamber of Commerce. She wrote the History of Fruitland Park in 1924. She co-authored the History of Lake County, Florida in 1929.

She began her career with The Leesburg Commercial newspaper as the first Fruitland correspondent and later became a staff member in their society department. At the time, The Leesburg Commercial did not have a sports writer despite the rising success of the Leesburg athletic teams, and Lillian took up an informal role of sports writing to meet this need. On September 7, 1938, the Leesburg Commercial newspaper staff promoted her to the title of “Sports Editor," thus making her the first female sports editor for a newspaper. She later became a correspondent for the Orlando Sentinel newspaper as well.

She also complied many volumes detailing local military service in World War II which was later used to erect a memorial in their honor in 1994. The American Legion Post 219 presented the City of Leesburg with a plaque in honor of her dedication that year.

== Personal life ==
After her marriage to Ormond Vickers-Smith on March 20, 1919, Lillian moved to Fruitland Park, Florida. During her residence in Florida, she began a family and had two sons, Harold Dyer and John Edward, and one daughter, Nathalie Vivien. She died on July 4, 1971 in Asheville, North Carolina.
