= Astor Park, Florida =

- Unincorporated community
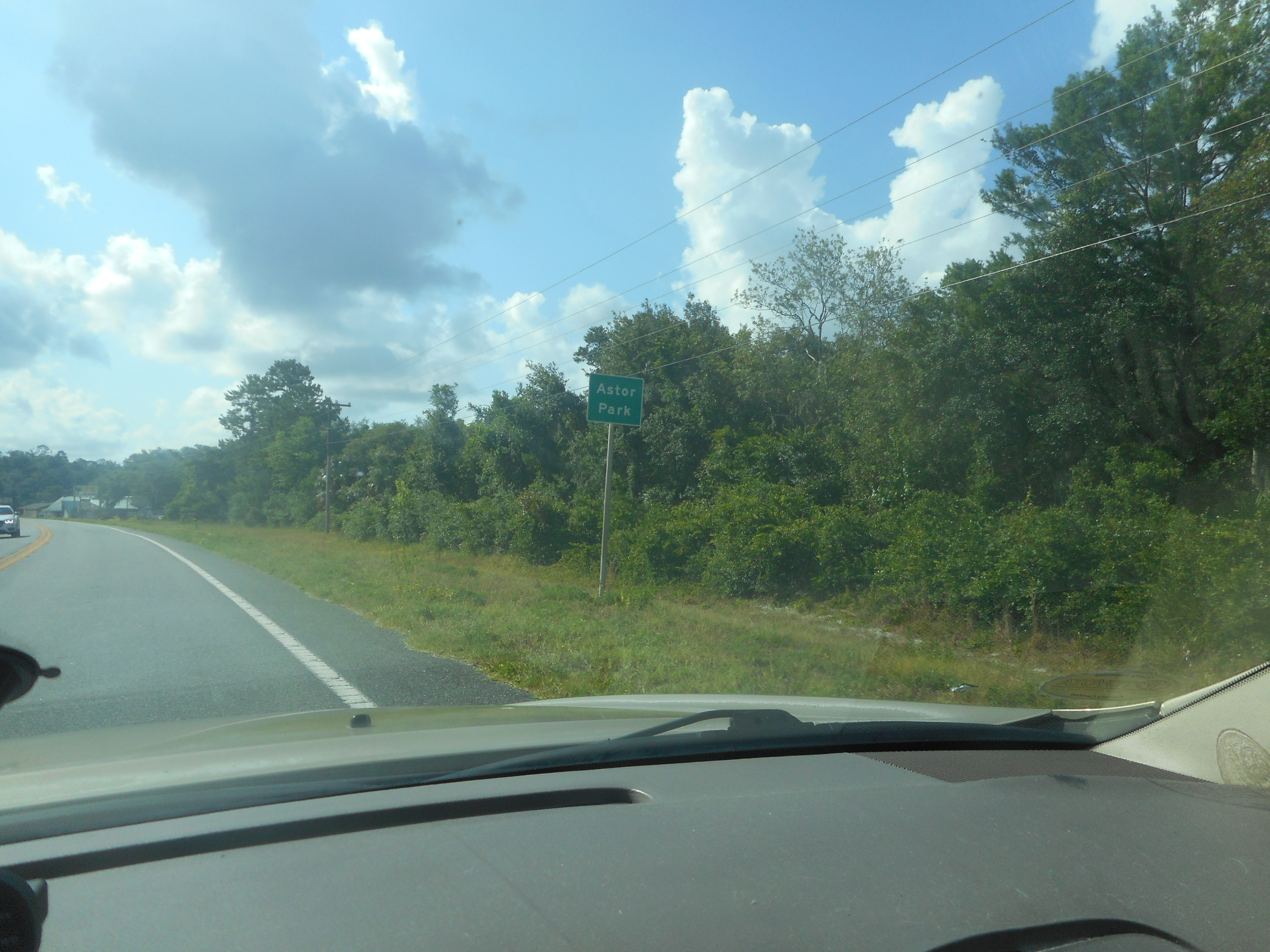
- Florida SR 40 as it enters Astor Park, in June 2019.

- Location within Florida Location within the United States
- Coordinates: 29°09′13″N 81°34′19″W
- Country: United States
- State: Florida
- County: Lake
- Elevation: 46 ft (14 m)
- Time zone: UTC-5 (Eastern (EST))
  - Summer (DST): UTC-4 (EDT)
- ZIP Code: 32102
- Area code: 352
- GNIS feature ID: 305225

Astor Park is an unincorporated community in Lake County, Florida, United States. The community straddles State Road 40, with the community of Astor to the east and the Ocala National Forest to the west. It also includes the northern termini of CR 445 and CR 445A.

Astor Park was served by the St. Johns and Lake Eustis Railway until 1941. Today it survives as a tourist stop for campers and hikers at both Ocala National Forest and the Lake George State Forest.
