= Pittman, Florida =

- Census-designated place
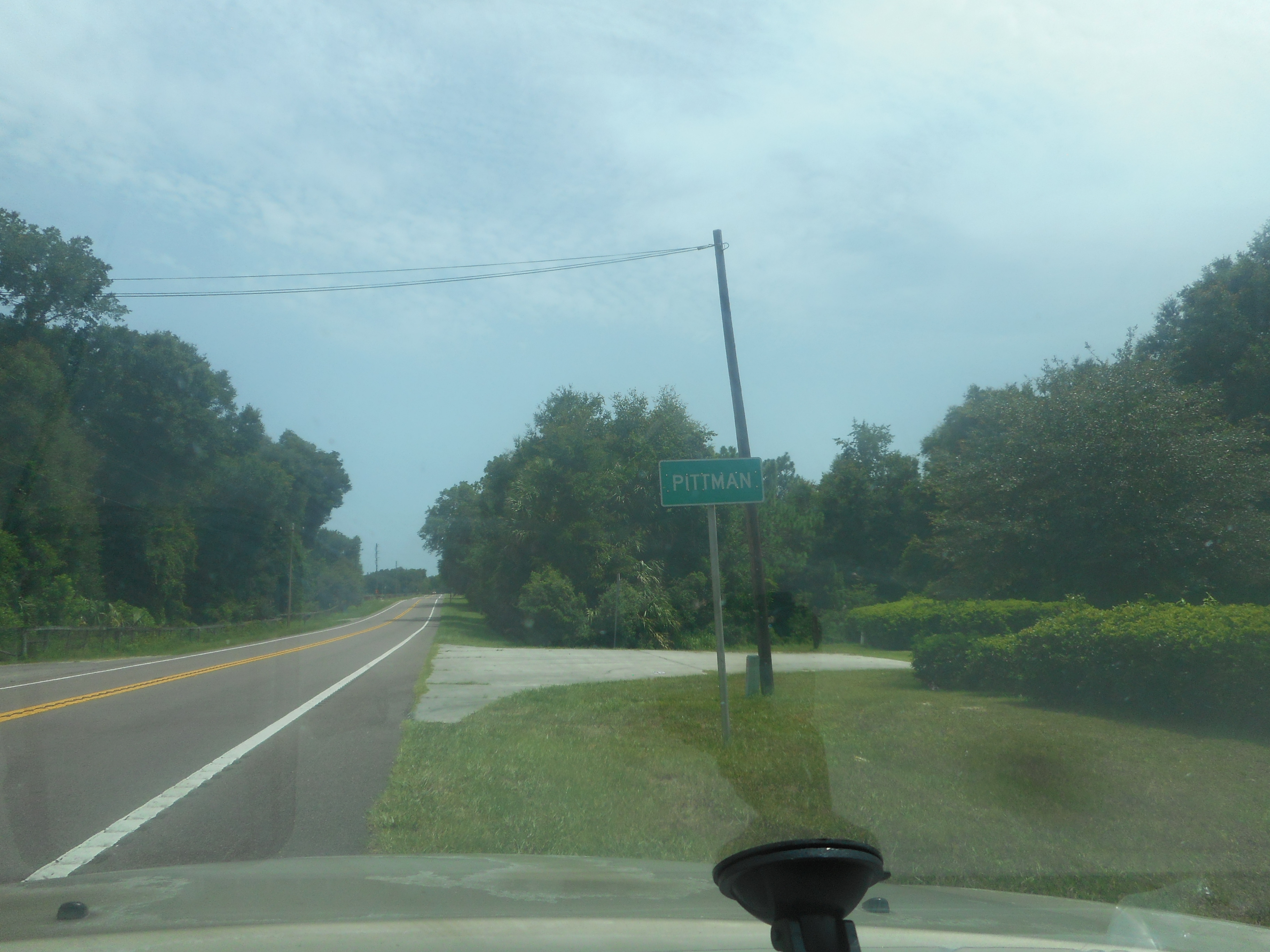
- Northbound Florida SR 19 as it enters Pittman; June 2020.

- Location in Lake County and the state of Florida
- Coordinates: 28°59′58″N 81°38′44″W
- Country: United States
- State: Florida
- County: Lake

Area
  - Total: 1.29 sq mi (3.34 km^{2})
  - Land: 1.26 sq mi (3.26 km^{2})
  - Water: 0.027 sq mi (0.07 km^{2})
- Elevation: 82 ft (25 m)

Population (2020)
  - Total: 227
  - Density: 180.2/sq mi (69.59/km^{2})
- Time zone: UTC-5 (Eastern (EST))
  - Summer (DST): UTC-4 (EDT)
- ZIP code: 32702
- Area code: 352
- FIPS code: 12-57380
- GNIS feature ID: 2403424

Pittman is an unincorporated community and census-designated place (CDP) in Lake County, Florida, United States. As of the 2020 census, Pittman had a population of 227. It is part of the Orlando–Kissimmee Metropolitan Statistical Area.

== Geography ==
Pittman is located in northern Lake County and is bordered to the west by Marion County, to the east by Lake Dorr, and to the north by Ocala National Forest. Florida State Road 19 passes through the community, leading south 11 miles (18 km) to Eustis and north 52 miles (84 km) to Palatka.

According to the United States Census Bureau, the Pittman CDP has a total area of 1.3 square miles (3.3 km^{2}), of which 0.027 square miles (0.07 km^{2}), or 2.25%, are water.

== Demographics ==
Historical population
Census	Pop.	Note	%±
2020	227		—
U.S. Decennial Census

As of the census of 2000, there were 192 people, 69 households, and 58 families residing in the CDP. The population density was 149.7 inhabitants per square mile (57.8/km^{2}). There were 85 housing units at an average density of 66.3 per square mile (25.6/km^{2}). The racial makeup of the CDP was 83.85% White, 11.98% African American, 2.60% from other races, and 1.56% from two or more races. Hispanic or Latino of any race were 5.21% of the population.

There were 69 households, out of which 34.8% had children under the age of 18 living with them, 66.7% were married couples living together, 8.7% had a female householder with no husband present, and 15.9% were non-families. 15.9% of all households were made up of individuals, and 10.1% had someone living alone who was 65 years of age or older. The average household size was 2.78 and the average family size was 2.97.

In the CDP, the population was spread out, with 23.4% under the age of 18, 12.5% from 18 to 24, 23.4% from 25 to 44, 29.2% from 45 to 64, and 11.5% who were 65 years of age or older. The median age was 37 years. For every 100 females, there were 118.2 males. For every 100 females age 18 and over, there were 104.2 males.

The median income for a household in the CDP was $16,375, and the median income for a family was $4,896. Males had a median income of $31,250 versus $0 for females. The per capita income for the CDP was $17,113. About 52.2% of families and 28.2% of the population were below the poverty line, including none of those under the age of eighteen or sixty five or over.
