= Lake Correctional Institution =

State prison in Lake County, Florida

Coordinates: 28°37′09″N 81°45′56″W

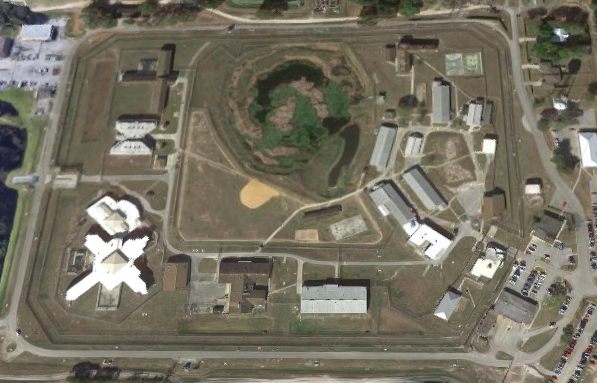
- Overhead view of LAKCI
- Interactive map of Lake Correctional Institution
- Location: 19225 U.S. 27 Clermont, Florida
- Status: Operational
- Security class: Minimum, medium, close, and maximum
- Capacity: 603
- Population: 508 (October 2023)
- Opened: 1973
- Managed by: Florida Department of Corrections
- Warden: David Colon

Lake Correctional Institution (LAKCI) is a state prison for men located in Clermont, Lake County, Florida, that is owned and operated by the Florida Department of Corrections. Opened in 1973, this facility, which has a maximum capacity of 603 prisoners, houses a mix of security levels, including community, minimum, medium, close, and maximum.

== Incidents ==
In 2018, inmate Alinton John escaped from his minimum security unit and was captured without incident the following day.

In July 2019, inmate Otis Miller was nearly beaten to death by correctional officers, sustaining severe injuries, including bruising, a blood clot, fractured ribs, and a pulmonary contusion. The officers were initially charged with felonies, but the charges were later dropped due to lack of evidence.

In June 2020, inmate Christopher Howell was beaten to death by prison guard Michael Riley. Howell, serving a four-year sentence, was beaten up in his cell while handcuffed. Riley was found guilty of manslaughter, with a jury finding that Riley used excessive force and did not follow proper procedure.
