= Orange Bend, Florida =

Unincorporated community in Florida, U.S.

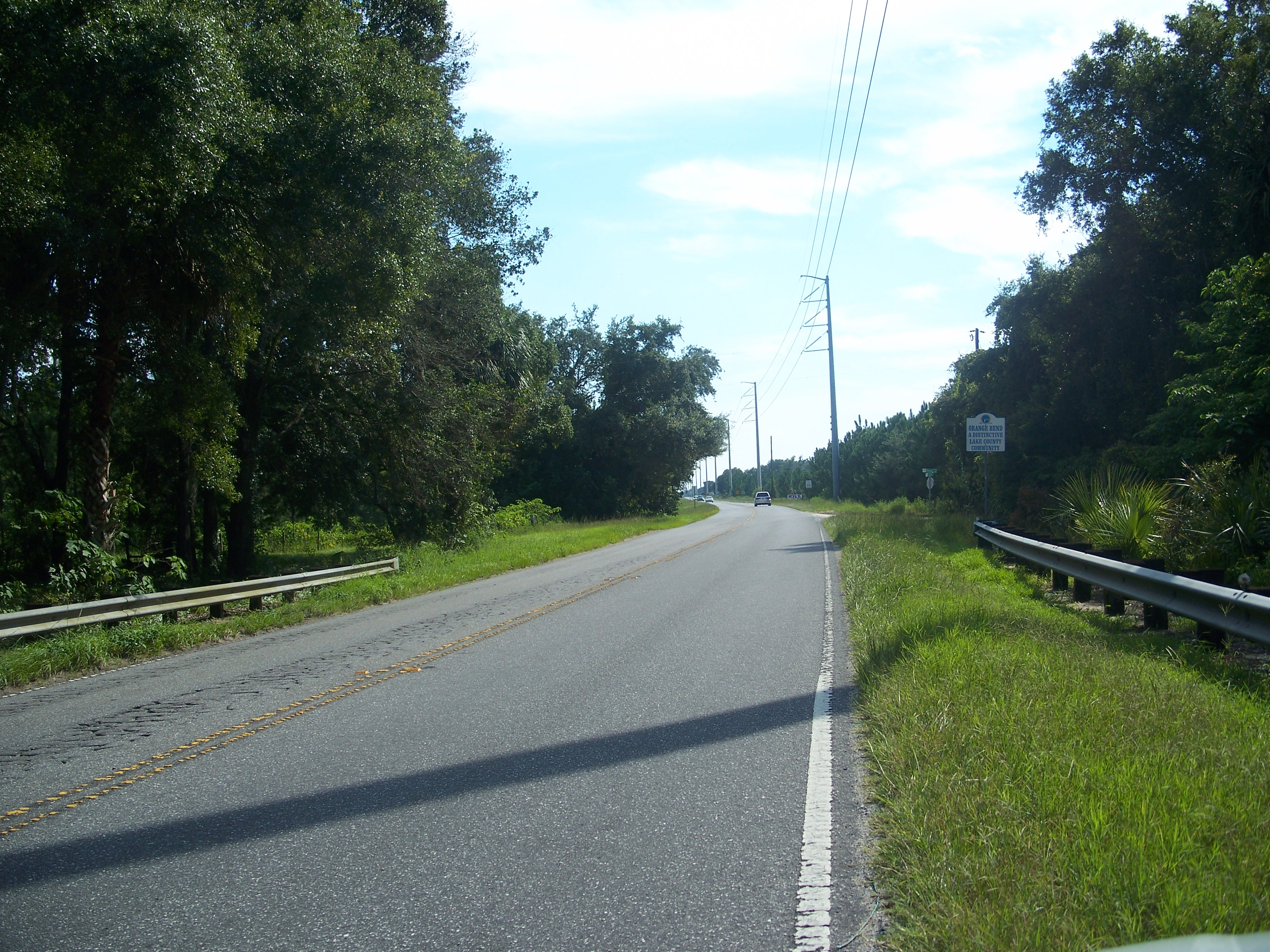
On County Road 44, looking south toward Orange Bend

Orange Bend is an unincorporated community in Lake County, Florida, United States. The community is located on County Road 44 and is part of the Orlando–Kissimmee Metropolitan Statistical Area.

== Geography ==
Orange Bend is located at 28°51′40″N 81°47′55″W.
