= Fort Gates Ferry =

Automobile ferry in Fruitland Cove, Florida, US

Coordinates: 29°26′0″N 81°39′50″W

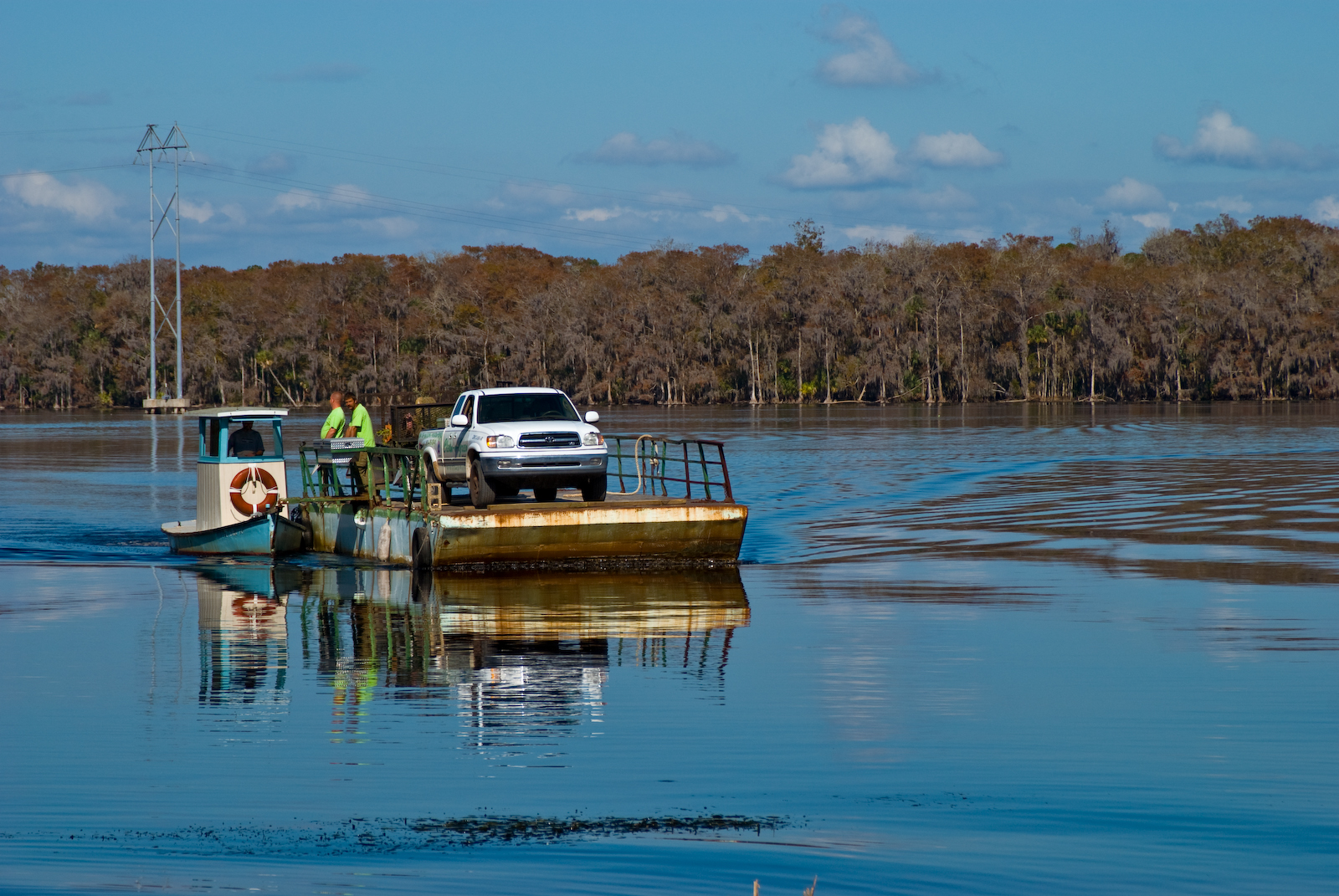
- Waterway: St. Johns River
- Transit type: Barge
- Route: Florida Black Bear Scenic Byway
- Carries: Automobiles
- Operator: Fort Gates Fish Camp
- Began operation: 1853
- Travel time: 10 minutes
- Yearly vehicles: 2500
- Route ID: 764039 / 764043

The Fort Gates Ferry is an auto ferry that crosses the St. Johns River in Florida, downstream of Lake George and just upstream of Little Lake George, at Fruitland Cove. The oldest operating ferry in Florida, it acts as part of the Florida Black Bear Scenic Byway.

== Location and history ==
The Fort Gates Ferry, also known as the Gateway Ferry, connects Fort Gates Ferry Road near Pomona Park on the east bank of the St. Johns River with Forest Service Road 43, leading to Salt Springs in the Ocala National Forest, on the west bank. The ferry first entered service in 1853, and it is the oldest ferry service still operating in Florida. It was operated as a military ferry by the Confederate Army during the American Civil War.

The current ferry began operation in 1914, and is one of four still operating in the state of Florida. The ferry, part of the Florida Black Bear Scenic Byway, consists of a barge pushed by a tugboat converted from a 1910 Sharpie sailboat. It has a weight limit of 15 tonnes (15 long tons; 17 short tons). The tugboat, named Too Wendy, is 18 feet (5.5 m) long and is powered by a 65 horsepower (48 kW) diesel engine. Hurricane Gladys sunk the ferry's tugboat in 1968; service was suspended until it could be raised.

In 1972, an automobile commercial featuring Paul Newman was filmed on the Fort Gates Ferry. In 2009 the ferry was part of a route named the "World's Worst Commute" in a contest run to promote a brand of motor oil.

== Traffic ==
The ferry, with a toll of $10, is one of four in Florida. Operating daily except Tuesday during daylight hours, it has an estimated annual traffic load of 1,500 vehicles per year. The ferry takes ten minutes to cross the one mile (1.6 km) span of the river; it can carry two to four pickup trucks, a dozen motorcycles, or 38 dirt bikes or bicycles.

The ferry is privately operated by the Fort Gates Fish Camp, and is funded by Putnam County as a public transportation service; the subsidy was set at $10,000 per year in 1995. Putnam County is planning on replacing the ferry landings with new structures.

== Closure ==
The passage of Hurricane Irma in 2017 damaged the ferry and ferry landing, forcing the temporary suspension of the service; by February 2019 repairs had not yet been conducted. In October 2019 the Putnam County Commission authorized funds for repairing the ferry landing, but by late 2020 the ferry had not been repaired, and local residents believed it would never return to service.
