= Grand Island, Florida =

- Unincorporated community
- Location within Florida Location within the United States
- Coordinates: 28°52′57″N 81°43′44″W
- Country: United States of America
- State: Florida
- County: Lake
- Elevation: 108 ft (33 m)
- Time zone: UTC-5 (Eastern (EST))
  - Summer (DST): UTC-4 (EDT)
- ZIP code: 32735
- Area code: 352
- GNIS feature ID: 305746

Grand Island is an unincorporated community in Lake County, Florida, United States. Grand Island is 3.5 miles (5.6 km) northwest of Eustis and has a post office with ZIP code 32735.

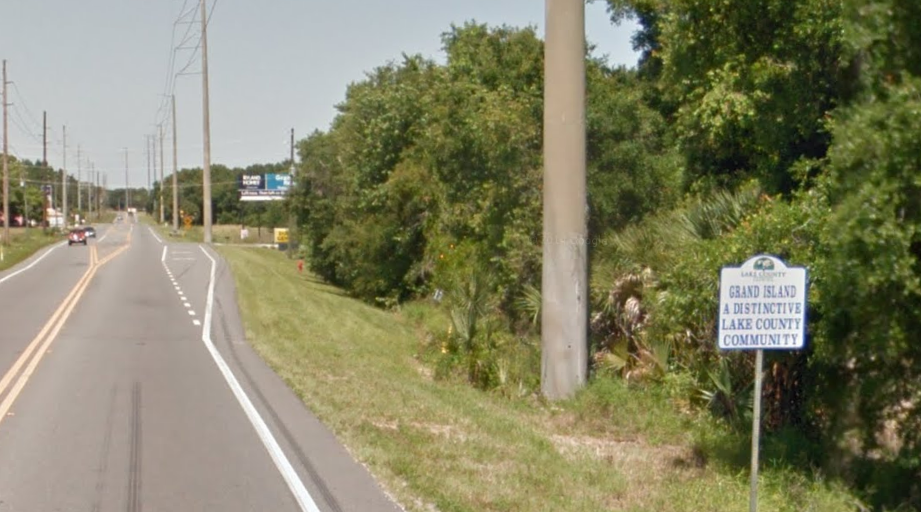
Entering Grand Island on County Road 44.
