= Fruitland Park, Florida =

- City
- City of Fruitland Park
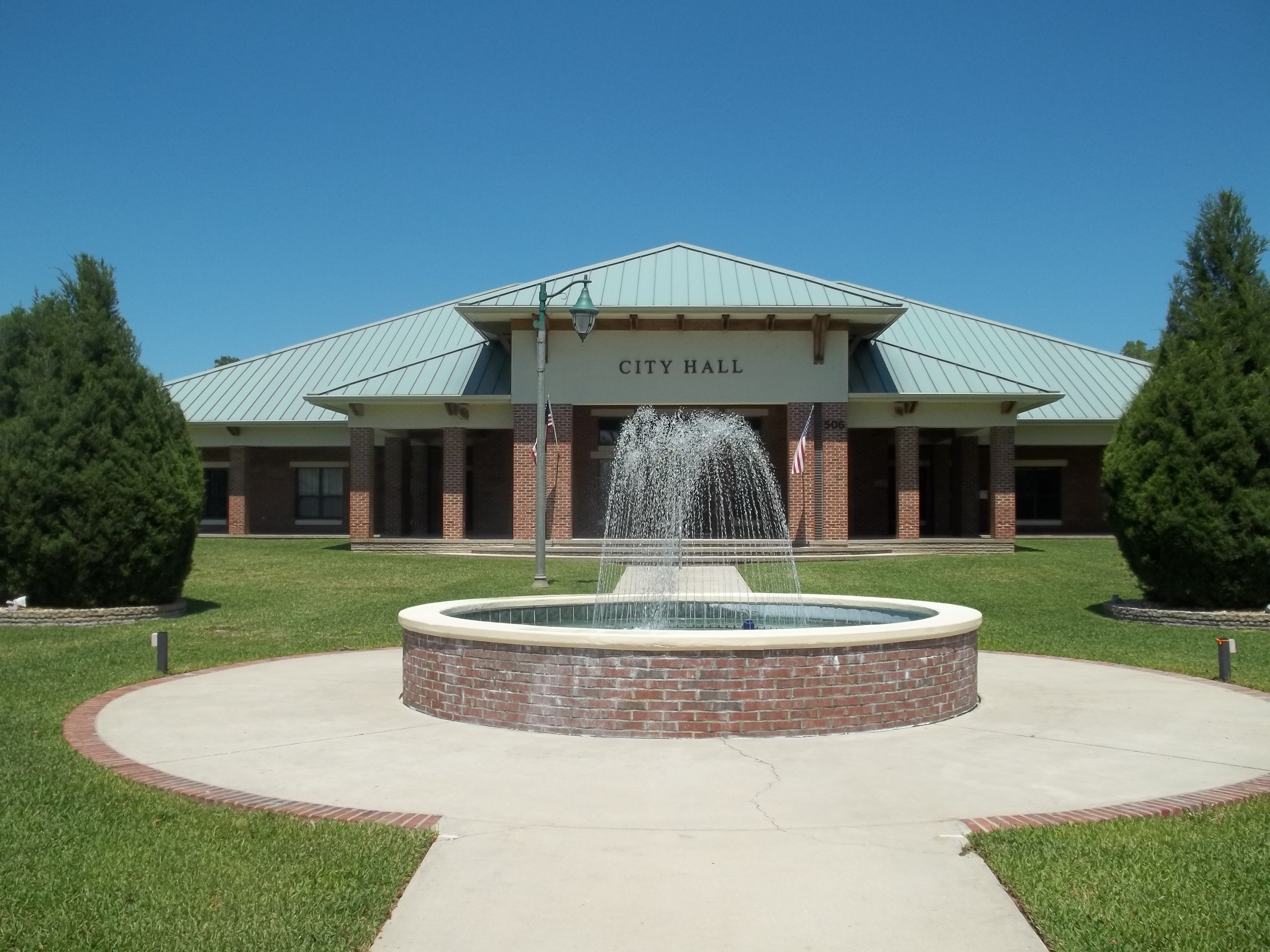
- Motto: The Friendly City
- Location in Lake County and the state of Florida
- Coordinates: 28°52′20″N 81°54′30″W
- Country: United States
- State: Florida
- County: Lake
- Incorporated: May 25, 1927

Government
  - Type: Commission-Manager

Area
  - Total: 7.27 sq mi (18.82 km^{2})
  - Land: 6.96 sq mi (18.03 km^{2})
  - Water: 0.31 sq mi (0.79 km^{2})
- Elevation: 66 ft (20 m)

Population (2020)
  - Total: 8,325
  - Density: 1,195.6/sq mi (461.63/km^{2})
- Time zone: UTC-5 (Eastern (EST))
  - Summer (DST): UTC-4 (EDT)
- ZIP code: 34731
- Area code: 352
- FIPS code: 12-24975
- GNIS feature ID: 2403668
- Website: www.fruitlandpark.org

Fruitland Park is a city in Lake County, Florida, United States. It is part of the Orlando–Kissimmee–Sanford Metropolitan Statistical Area. The population was 8,325 at the 2020 census.

== History ==
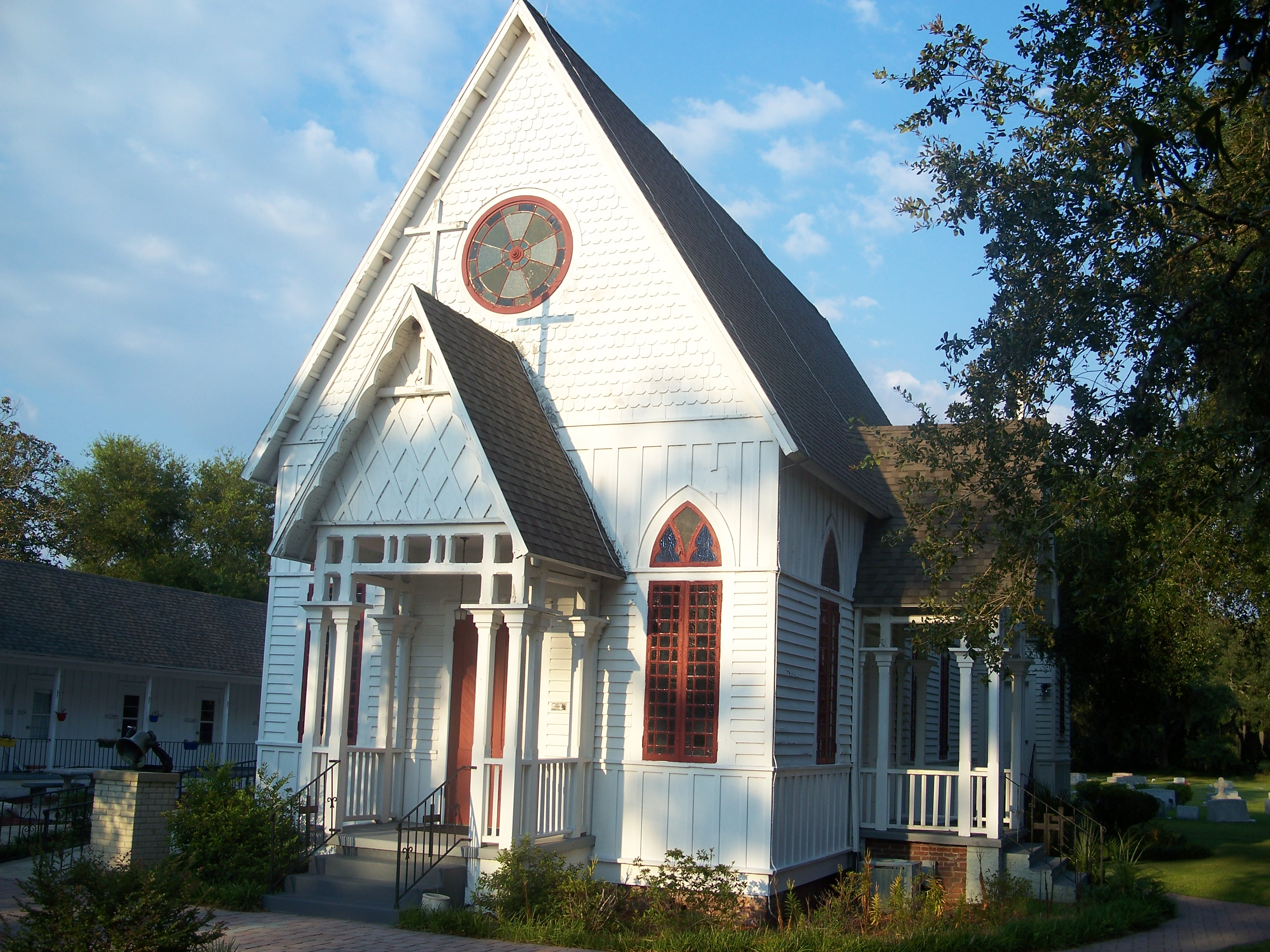
Holy Trinity Episcopal Church, on the National Register of Historic Places

Fruitland Park antedates the American Civil War, although the name of the town only came later, as it was originally called Gardenia. The earliest settler was M. Calvin Lee, of the Evander Lee family of Leesburg, who planted a citrus grove. After the war, a son-in-law of the Lee family, P.S. Bouknight, homesteaded 40 acres (160,000 m^{2}) near Mirror Lake.

In 1875, the State of Florida sent Captain Kendricks to the northern part of the United States to talk about the advantages of living in Florida. Due to Major Orlando P. Rooks' poor health, and already considering a move, he had his wife, Josephine, moved to Fruitland Park. They built their first home on Crystal Lake in 1877. It was here that the first white child, Frederic, was born in 1882.

The Fruitland Nurseries of Augusta, Georgia, was owned by J. P. Berckmann, friend of Major Rook. Major Rook named the town Fruitland Park for the nurseries, and the main street Berckmann Street for this friend.

The postal authorities refused to recognize the name Fruitland Park as there was already a Fruitland in the state. At their request, the name was changed to Gardenia in 1884. The Florida Railroad, put through the town just prior to this, had listed the town as Fruitland Park in all their printed matter and refused to recognize the new name of Gardenia. Consequently, all freight and express had to be directed to Fruitland Park and all mail addressed to Gardenia. This caused a great deal of confusion, which lasted from 1884 to 1888, when a petition was sent to the postal authorities to have the name changed back to Fruitland Park. The petition was granted in 1888.

On December 20, 1884, Rev. G.W. Butler organized the first "community" church in Fruitland Park, it was called the Community Church a Methodist Episcopal church founded by the Illinois conference. The church had acquired lots on College Ave., between Fountain St. and Lime St. The church was built in 1886–1887. That building burned in 1934, but was rebuilt in 1935. That building was later sold to the United Pentecostal Church and still remains today.

Fruitland Park was granted a charter by the state, and incorporated on May 25, 1927.

Fruitland Park is also home to the oldest Dirt Kart Track in America. The 1/8 mile clay oval kart track has hosted Saturday Night Dirt Kart Racing for Go Kart enthusiasts since opening in 1958.

=== Expansion of The Villages ===
On December 10, 2013, The Villages of Lake-Sumter Inc. closed on a deal to purchase property in Fruitland Park for $8 million from a private owner. Subsequently, they also began the annexation and rezoning process with the city. The property is currently the construction site for 2,038 new Villages homes, a project with final completion projected sometime in 2016. It was determined that the city of Fruitland Park stands to earn approximately $13 million in impact fees and building permits as a result of the expansion, not including ongoing tax revenues upon completion.

== Geography ==
According to the United States Census Bureau, the city has a total area of 9.5 km^{2} (3.7 sq mi), of which 7.6 km^{2} (2.9 sq mi) is land and 1.9 km^{2} (0.73 sq mi) (20.44%) is water.

== Demographics ==
Historical population
Census	Pop.	Note	%±
1930	270		—
1940	362		34.1%
1950	551		52.2%
1960	774		40.5%
1970	1,359		75.6%
1980	2,259		66.2%
1990	2,754		21.9%
2000	3,186		15.7%
2010	4,078		28.0%
2020	8,325		104.1%
U.S. Decennial Census

=== Racial and ethnic composition ===
Fruitland Park racial composition (Hispanics excluded from racial categories) (NH = Non-Hispanic)
Race	Pop 2010	Pop 2020	% 2010	% 2020
White (NH)	3,234	6,555	79.30%	78.74%
Black or African American (NH)	373	630	9.15%	7.57%
Native American or Alaska Native (NH)	7	22	0.17%	0.26%
Asian (NH)	57	144	1.40%	1.73%
Pacific Islander or Native Hawaiian (NH)	13	18	0.32%	0.22%
Some other race (NH)	4	39	0.10%	0.47%
Two or more races/Multiracial (NH)	77	225	1.89%	2.70%
Hispanic or Latino (any race)	313	692	7.68%	8.31%
Total	4,078	8,325		

=== 2020 census ===
As of the 2020 census, Fruitland Park had a population of 8,325. The median age was 59.5 years. 15.6% of residents were under the age of 18 and 38.5% were 65 years of age or older. For every 100 females, there were 90.1 males, and for every 100 females age 18 and over, there were 87.5 males age 18 and over.

92.4% of residents lived in urban areas, while 7.6% lived in rural areas.

There were 3,667 households in Fruitland Park, of which 18.8% had children under the age of 18 living in them. Of all households, 59.4% were married-couple households, 11.7% were households with a male householder and no spouse or partner present, and 22.9% were households with a female householder and no spouse or partner present. About 21.9% of all households were made up of individuals and 13.9% had someone living alone who was 65 years of age or older.

There were 4,067 housing units, of which 9.8% were vacant. The homeowner vacancy rate was 1.4% and the rental vacancy rate was 12.1%.

According to the 2020 American Community Survey 5-year estimates, there were 2,639 families residing in the city.

=== 2010 census ===
As of the 2010 United States census, there were 4,078 people, 1,385 households, and 1,008 families residing in the city.

=== 2000 census ===
As of the census of 2000, there were 3,186 people, 1,192 households, and 890 families residing in the city. The population density was 421.3 people/km^{2} (1,091 people/mi^{2}). There were 1,288 housing units at an average density of 170.3 units/km^{2} (441 units/mi^{2}). The racial makeup of the city was 89.08% White, 7.16% African American, 0.56% Native American, 1.32% Asian, 0.06% Pacific Islander, 0.63% from other races, and 1.19% from two or more races. Hispanic or Latino of any race were 2.54% of the population.

In 2000, there were 1,192 households, out of which 37.2% had children under the age of 18 living with them, 56.1% were married couples living together, 14.2% had a female householder with no husband present, and 25.3% were non-families. 20.8% of all households were made up of individuals, and 8.9% had someone living alone who was 65 years of age or older. The average household size was 2.67 and the average family size was 3.07.

In 2000, in the city, the population was spread out, with 27.9% under the age of 18, 8.6% from 18 to 24, 29.2% from 25 to 44, 22.3% from 45 to 64, and 12.0% who were 65 years of age or older. The median age was 36 years. For every 100 females, there were 93.2 males. For every 100 females age 18 and over, there were 88.2 males.

In 2000, the median income for a household in the city was $40,403, and the median income for a family was $42,665. Males had a median income of $29,375 versus $19,951 for females. The per capita income for the city was $16,400. About 8.1% of families and 10.2% of the population were below the poverty line, including 14.0% of those under age 18 and 3.0% of those age 65 or over.

=== Demographic estimates ===
As of 2018 population is around 6,000 as the villages have built hundreds of new homes.

== Transportation ==
=== Major roads ===
- US 27 / US 441 is the main road that runs north and south throughout Fruitland Park, and the only major road within the city. It is a two-route concurrency that began south of the city in Leesburg, and will end north of the city in Ocala. The route also contains two hidden state roads; Florida State Road 25 (for US 27) and Florida State Road 500 (for US 441).
- CR 25A runs south and north through Fruitland Park, and is the second suffixed alternate of hidden State Road 25 in Lake County. The first one is south of Leesburg.
- CR 466A is Miller Boulevard, a suffixed alternate route of CR 466.
- CR 468 runs south to north despite being an even-numbered route. It enters Fruitland Park along Rooks Avenue from the border with Leesburg at Schoolview Street and curves to the northeast to join Willard Avenue. When Willard Avenue ends at West Berckman Street, CR 468 runs east for one block then turns north again at Rose Avenue. Three blocks later, Lake CR 468 terminates at CR 466A (Miller Boulevard). Rose Avenue continues north 0.3 miles toward Shiloh Street.

=== Buses ===
Fruitland Park is the headquarters of LakeXpress buses, even though the mailing address of the bus service is in Tavares.

== Notable people ==
- Lillian Vickers-Smith, first female sports editor in the United States

== See also ==
- Lake Griffin State Park
