= Lake County, Florida =

County in Florida, United States

- County
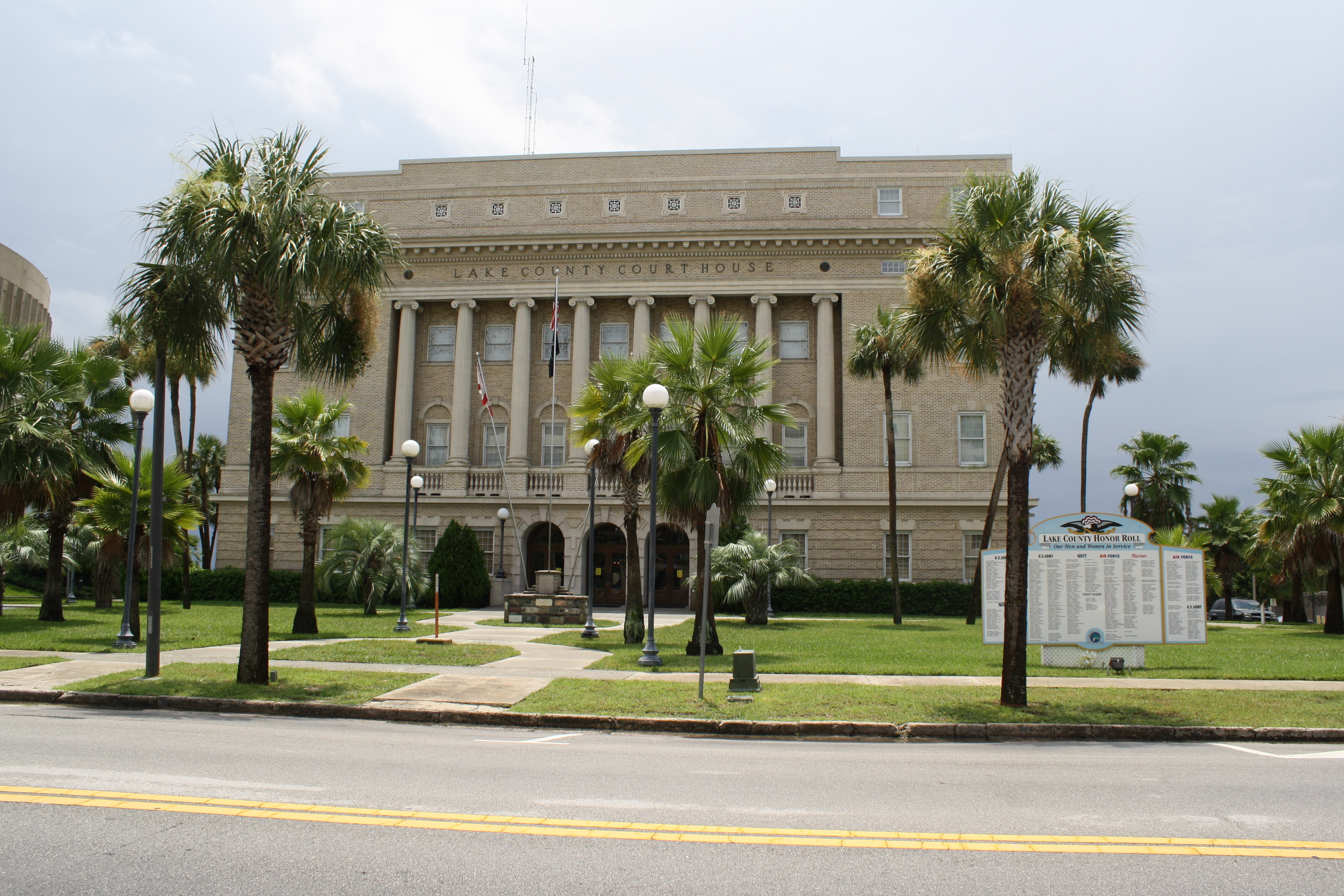
- Old Lake County Courthouse in Tavares

- Flag Seal Logo

- Location within the U.S. state of Florida
- Coordinates: 28°46′N 81°43′W
- Country: United States
- State: Florida
- Founded: May 27, 1887
- Seat: Tavares
- Largest city: Clermont

Area
  - Total: 1,157 sq mi (3,000 km^{2})
  - Land: 938 sq mi (2,430 km^{2})
  - Water: 219 sq mi (570 km^{2}) 18.9%

Population (2020)
  - Total: 383,956
  - Estimate (2025): 456,068 ▲
  - Density: 409/sq mi (158/km^{2})
- Time zone: UTC−5 (Eastern)
  - Summer (DST): UTC−4 (EDT)
- Congressional districts: 6th, 11th
- Website: www.lakecountyfl.gov

Lake County is a county in the central portion of the U.S. state of Florida. As of the 2020 census, the population was 383,956. Its county seat is Tavares, and its largest city is Clermont. Lake County is included in the Orlando–Kissimmee–Sanford Metropolitan Statistical Area.

== History ==
Lake County was created in 1887 from portions of Sumter and Orange counties. The Bill creating Lake County, was introduced by Representative Henry Holcomb Duncan, a resident of Tavares, Florida. Upon the creation of Lake County, he became the first Clerk of Court and Mr. Duncan served in that capacity until his death in 1920. It was named for the many lakes contained within its borders (250 named lakes and 1,735 other bodies of water).

In the 1800s, the two main industries in the area were growing cotton and breeding cattle. In the latter part of the 19th century, people started to grow citrus trees. Citrus was introduced by Melton Haynes. Throughout the 1940s and 50s, citrus production increased and grew into the area's leading industry. The December 1989 United States cold wave destroyed most of the citrus groves, dealing an economic blow from which many growers could not recover. Grove owners sold massive amounts of land to developers, resulting in increasing urban sprawl.

== Geography ==
According to the U.S. Census Bureau, the county has a total area of 1,157 square miles (3,000 km^{2}), of which 938 square miles (2,430 km^{2}) is land and 219 square miles (570 km^{2}) (18.9%) is water.

Sugarloaf Mountain is the highest point in peninsular Florida, at 312 feet (95 m) above sea level.

=== Adjacent counties ===
- Volusia County – northeast
- Orange County – east
- Seminole County – east
- Osceola County – southeast
- Polk County – south
- Sumter County – west
- Marion County – northwest

=== National protected areas ===
- Lake Woodruff National Wildlife Refuge (part)
- Ocala National Forest (part)

== Demographics ==
Historical population
Census	Pop.	Note	%±
1890	8,034		—
1900	7,467		−7.1%
1910	9,509		27.3%
1920	12,744		34.0%
1930	23,161		81.7%
1940	27,255		17.7%
1950	36,340		33.3%
1960	57,383		57.9%
1970	69,305		20.8%
1980	104,870		51.3%
1990	152,104		45.0%
2000	210,528		38.4%
2010	297,052		41.1%
2020	383,956		29.3%
2025 (est.)	456,068	▲	18.8%
U.S. Decennial Census; 1790–1960 1900–1990; 1990–2000 2010–2019

=== Racial and ethnic composition ===
Lake County, Florida – Racial and ethnic composition Note: the US Census treats Hispanic/Latino as an ethnic category. This table excludes Latinos from the racial categories and assigns them to a separate category. Hispanics/Latinos may be of any race.
Race / Ethnicity (NH = Non-Hispanic)	Pop 1980	Pop 1990	Pop 2000	Pop 2010	Pop 2020	% 1980	% 1990	% 2000	% 2010	% 2020
White alone (NH)	89,028	133,071	177,285	221,365	253,214	84.89%	87.49%	84.21%	74.52%	65.95%
Black or African American alone (NH)	13,049	13,774	17,231	27,796	37,883	12.44%	9.06%	8.18%	9.36%	9.87%
Native American or Alaska Native alone (NH)	191	366	603	965	1,016	0.18%	0.24%	0.29%	0.32%	0.26%
Asian alone (NH)	259	548	1,640	5,055	8,362	0.25%	0.36%	0.78%	1.70%	2.18%
Native Hawaiian or Pacific Islander alone (NH)	x	x	62	194	317	x	x	0.03%	0.07%	0.08%
Other race alone (NH)	88	40	168	1,052	2,916	0.08%	0.03%	0.08%	0.35%	0.76%
Mixed race or Multiracial (NH)	x	x	1,731	4,616	14,873	x	x	0.82%	1.55%	3.87%
Hispanic or Latino (any race)	2,255	4,305	11,808	36,009	65,375	2.15%	2.83%	5.61%	12.12%	17.03%
Total	104,870	152,104	210,528	297,052	383,956	100.00%	100.00%	100.00%	100.00%	100.00%

=== 2020 census ===
As of the 2020 census, there were 383,956 people, 156,923 households, and 94,332 families residing in the county.

The median age was 48.2 years. 18.6% of residents were under the age of 18 and 27.5% of residents were 65 years of age or older. For every 100 females there were 93.0 males, and for every 100 females age 18 and over there were 90.8 males age 18 and over.

Of the 156,923 households in the county, 24.6% had children under the age of 18 living in them. Of all households, 51.1% were married-couple households, 16.0% were households with a male householder and no spouse or partner present, and 26.0% were households with a female householder and no spouse or partner present. About 26.1% of all households were made up of individuals and 14.7% had someone living alone who was 65 years of age or older.

There were 177,628 housing units, of which 11.7% were vacant. Among occupied housing units, 73.8% were owner-occupied and 26.2% were renter-occupied. The homeowner vacancy rate was 2.1% and the rental vacancy rate was 10.0%.

The racial makeup of the county was 70.2% White, 10.3% Black or African American, 0.4% American Indian and Alaska Native, 2.2% Asian, 0.1% Native Hawaiian and Pacific Islander, 6.0% from some other race, and 10.8% from two or more races. Hispanic or Latino residents of any race comprised 17.0% of the population.

82.1% of residents lived in urban areas, while 17.9% lived in rural areas.

=== 2010 census ===
As of the census of 2010, there were 297,047 people and 130,190 households residing in the county. The population density was 316.6 inhabitants per square mile (122.2/km^{2}). There were 163,586 housing units at an average density of 174.3 per square mile (67.3/km^{2}). The racial makeup of the county was 83.4% White (68.7% non-Hispanic White), 11.5% Black or African American, 0.6% Native American, 2.3% Asian, 0.2% Pacific Islander, and 2.1% from two or more races. 16.7% of the population were Hispanic or Latino of any race.

There were 88,413 households, out of which 23.40% had children under the age of 18 living with them, 58.90% were married couples living together, 8.50% had a female householder with no husband present, and 29.30% were non-families. 24.60% of all households were made up of individuals, and 13.70% had someone living alone who was 65 years of age or older. The average household size was 2.34 and the average family size was 2.75.

In the county, the population was spread out, with 20.30% under the age of 18, 5.80% from 18 to 24, 23.80% from 25 to 44, 23.80% from 45 to 64, and 26.40% who were 65 years of age or older. The median age was 45 years. For every 100 females, there were 93.70 males. For every 100 females age 18 and over, there were 91.10 males.

The median income for a household in the county was $36,903, and the median income for a family was $42,577. Males had a median income of $31,475 versus $23,545 for females. The per capita income for the county was $20,199. About 6.90% of families and 9.60% of the population were below the poverty line, including 15.80% of those under age 18 and 6.30% of those age 65 or over.

== Economy ==
In March 2026, the largest employers in the county were Lake County Schools with 5,676 employees, Orlando Health with 3,637 employees, AdventHealth with 3,300 employees, Publix with 2,828 employees and Walmart with 2,062 employees.

== Government ==
Lake County is represented in the United States Senate by Republicans Rick Scott and Ashley Moody.

Since redistricting following the 2020 U.S. census, Lake County has been part of Florida's 6th and 11th congressional districts. They are represented by Republicans Randy Fine and Daniel Webster, respectively.

=== Elected officials ===
List of current elected officials:

County commissioners:

- District 1 – Anthony Sabatini
- District 2 – Sean M. Parks
- District 3 – Kirby Smith
- District 4 – Leslie Campione
- District 5 – Timothy Morris

School board members:

- District 1 - Bill Mathias (vice chair)
- District 2 - Tyler Brandeburg (chair)
- District 3 - Marc Dodd
- District 4 - Mollie Cunningham
- District 5 - Stephanie Luke

County constitutional officers:

- Sheriff – Peyton Grinnell
- Clerk of the Circuit Court – Gary J. Cooney
- Property appraiser – Mark V. Jordan
- Tax collector – David W. Jordan
- Supervisor of elections – Alan Hays

The county lies within one state senatorial district:

- the 13th (covering the entire county and parts of Orange County, held by Republican Keith Truenow)

The county lies within three state representative districts:

- the 27th (covering the northeastern part of the county, held by Republican Richard Gentry)
- the 26th (covering the north-central part of the county, held by Republican Nan Cobb)
- the 25th (covering the central and southern part of the county, held by Republican Taylor Yarkosky)

The Florida Department of Corrections has Region III Correctional Facility Office on the grounds of the Lake Correctional Institution in an unincorporated area in Lake County.

=== Libraries ===
The Lake County Library System was established in 1982 by Lake County Ordinance 1982-18 following the establishment of the Lake County Library Planning Advisory Board in 1975. Today it is governed by the Lake County Board of County Commissioners. The library system is made up of 6 branch libraries and 10 municipal libraries:

- Astor County Library, Astor
- Cagan Crossings Community Library, built in 2008 in Clermont
- Cooper Memorial Library: The Cooper Memorial Library's history began in 1905 when a traveling salesman stopped by a boarding house run by the Benjamin McCain family and promised to donate enough books to start a town library if he was able to sell his Chautauqua lectures. Money was contributed, but very few lectures occurred, and books were never donated. Money that was to be used for the final payment for the lecture series was instead used to start a library. The first librarian of the library was Ms. Payson Pierce, who offered her own home for book storage as well as opened her home to the public. In 1914, a permanent structure was built. Women of the Library Club supported the library until 1936 when the Clermont City Council agreed to maintain it. In 2002, Cooper Memorial became a branch of the Lake County Library System.
- East Lake County Library, Sorrento
- Eustis Memorial Library, Eustis
- Fruitland Park Library first began in 1916 from the donation of books from the Bosanquet and Dwight families. Twenty years later, under the joint support of the women of St. Paul's Catholic Church, Holy Trinity Episcopal Church, and the Community Methodist Church, it became a community library. In 1970, Fruitland Park Library employed its first salaried librarian.
- Helen Lehmann Memorial Library, Montverde
- Lady Lake Public Library, Lady Lake
- Leesburg Public Library, Leesburg
- Marianne Beck Memorial Library: The Marianne Beck Memorial Library began in 1989 as an Eagle Scout project in a former carport in Howey-in-the-Hills, Florida. The local community raised $50,000 to remodel a former convenience store that was purchased by the town for the new library.
- Marion Baysinger Memorial Library, Groveland
- Minneola Schoolhouse Library, Minneola
- Paisley County Library, Paisley
- Tavares Public Library, Tavares
- Umatilla Public Library, Umatilla
- W.T. Bland Public Library, Mount Dora

=== Elections ===
Lake County has voted Republican in U.S. presidential races since 1948.

United States presidential election results for Lake County, Florida
Year	Republican		Democratic		Third party(ies)	
Year	No.	%	No.	%	No.	%
1888	910	40.77%	1,278	57.26%	44	1.97%
1892	0	0.00%	1,137	85.68%	190	14.32%
1896	302	24.35%	870	70.16%	68	5.48%
1900	143	20.58%	492	70.79%	60	8.63%
1904	148	20.33%	529	72.66%	51	7.01%
1908	200	24.01%	487	58.46%	146	17.53%
1912	92	11.34%	596	73.49%	123	15.17%
1916	330	25.25%	886	67.79%	91	6.96%
1920	734	28.90%	1,720	67.72%	86	3.39%
1924	948	36.46%	1,381	53.12%	271	10.42%
1928	3,383	68.08%	1,474	29.66%	112	2.25%
1932	1,867	37.82%	3,070	62.18%	0	0.00%
1936	2,034	33.46%	4,045	66.54%	0	0.00%
1940	2,659	33.32%	5,322	66.68%	0	0.00%
1944	2,693	38.38%	4,323	61.62%	0	0.00%
1948	3,579	43.23%	3,474	41.96%	1,226	14.81%
1952	9,132	70.63%	3,797	29.37%	0	0.00%
1956	10,888	71.57%	4,326	28.43%	0	0.00%
1960	12,979	72.45%	4,936	27.55%	0	0.00%
1964	12,897	62.39%	7,773	37.61%	0	0.00%
1968	11,763	47.42%	4,599	18.54%	8,442	34.03%
1972	23,079	82.63%	4,803	17.20%	48	0.17%
1976	19,976	57.42%	14,369	41.31%	442	1.27%
1980	26,798	64.53%	13,128	31.61%	1,602	3.86%
1984	35,319	74.29%	12,217	25.70%	7	0.01%
1988	37,327	68.40%	16,766	30.72%	479	0.88%
1992	30,825	44.17%	23,200	33.24%	15,762	22.59%
1996	35,097	47.48%	29,752	40.25%	9,074	12.27%
2000	50,010	56.44%	36,571	41.27%	2,030	2.29%
2004	74,389	60.02%	48,221	38.90%	1,340	1.08%
2008	82,802	56.19%	62,948	42.71%	1,621	1.10%
2012	87,643	57.99%	61,799	40.89%	1,702	1.13%
2016	102,188	59.48%	62,838	36.58%	6,773	3.94%
2020	125,859	59.56%	83,505	39.52%	1,950	0.92%
2024	140,500	61.75%	84,546	37.16%	2,468	1.08%

=== Voter registration ===
Data comes from the Florida Division of Elections.

Party Registration and Enrollment (April 30, 2025)
Party	Number of registered voters	%
Republican	131,901	47.15%
Democratic	69,886	24.98%
Independent	68,974	24.65%
Minor parties	8,999	3.22%
Total	279,760	100%

== Education ==
There are a number of public schools in the county.

=== Colleges ===
The following colleges are in the county:

- Lake-Sumter State College
- Beacon College
- Southern Technical College
- Lake Technical College

== Transportation ==
=== Aviation ===
The Tavares Seaplane Base is a city-owned, public-use seaplane base on Lake Dora in Tavares.

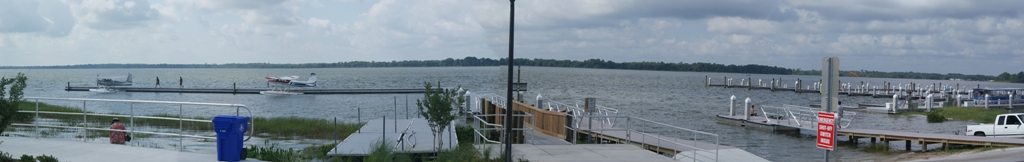
Panorama of the Tavares Seaplane Base & Marina on Lake Dora

The Leesburg International Airport is a former Army Airfield and municipal airport along Lake Harris east of downtown Leesburg, Florida.

Mid Florida Air Service Airport is on State Road 44 east of Eustis.

Umatilla Municipal Airport is east of the Umatilla Central Business District.

=== Major highways ===
- Florida's Turnpike runs north and south from Southeastern and Central Florida. Four interchanges exist in the county; Hancock Road (Exit 278), US 27/SR 19 (Exit 285), southbound US 27 (Exit 289) and County Road 470 (Exit 296).
- US 27 is the main local road through western Lake County, running south to north. It spans from Four Corners to The Villages.
- US 441 is another south to north US highway running through Mount Dora from Orange County around Lake Dora, where it merges with SR 44, has a wrong-way concurrency with SR 19 in Tavares, and lets go of SR 44 in Leesburg only to join US 27 as they both head into Marion County.
- SR 19 is a mostly scenic north and south road from SR 50 in Groveland through Tavares, Eustis, and Ocala National Forest.
- SR 33 is the north–south road from Lakeland in Polk County to Groveland. A county extension exists as a hidden route along SR 50 to Mascotte, where it becomes an exposed county road leading to US 27 in Okahumpka.
- SR 40 is the northernmost east–west route in Lake County, and runs through Ocala National Forest.
- SR 44 runs east and west through Central Lake County from west of Leesburg where it joins southbound US 441 until it breaks away near Mount Dora and heads northeast into Volusia County.
- SR 46 starts at an interchange with US 441 and County Road 46 in Mount Dora and through Sorrento and Mount Plymouth along the northern border of Orange County.
- SR 50 is the main east–west road through southern Lake County.

=== Public transportation ===
LakeXpress is the public transportation agency that serves the Lake County, Florida area since 2007.

=== Railroads ===
- The sole surviving railroad line through Lake County is the Florida Central Railroad which spans from Orange County near Mount Dora through Tavares, Eustis, and terminates near Umatilla. The line has been proposed for a yet-to-be built commuter line called the Orange Blossom Express since 2009. A short-lived tourist railroad named Tavares, Eustis and Gulf Railroad existed between 2011 and 2017.

== Communities ==
=== Cities ===
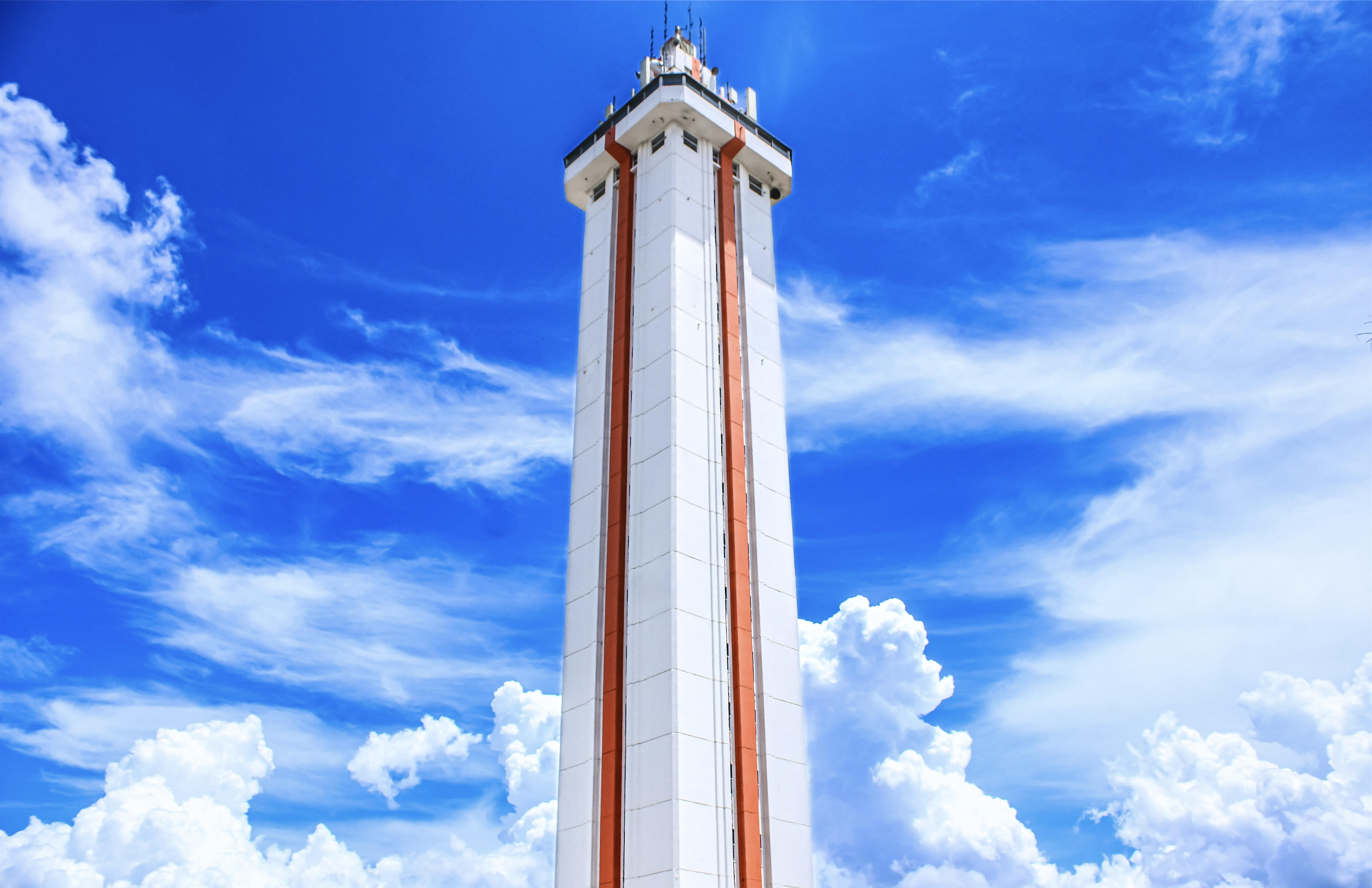
Florida Citrus Tower, an historic landmark located in Clermont

- Clermont
- Eustis
- Fruitland Park
- Groveland
- Leesburg
- Mascotte
- Minneola
- Mount Dora
- Tavares
- Umatilla

=== Towns ===
- Astatula
- Howey-in-the-Hills
- Lady Lake
- Montverde

=== Census-designated places ===
- Altoona
- Astor
- Ferndale
- Four Corners
- Lake Kathryn
- Lake Mack-Forest Hills
- Lisbon
- Mount Plymouth
- Okahumpka
- Paisley
- Pine Lakes
- Pittman
- Silver Lake
- Sorrento
- Yalaha

=== Other unincorporated communities ===
- Bassville Park
- Dona Vista
- Fort Mason
- Grand Island
- Lanier
- Orange Bend
- St. Clair
- The Villages (partly)

== Notable people ==
- Flora Call and Elias Disney were married January 1, 1888, in the Lake County town of Kismet. They were the parents of Walt Disney.
- The Groveland Four (Earnest Thomas, Charles Greenlee, Samuel Shepherd and Walter Irvin), who were falsely accused of raping a 17-year-old white woman and assaulting her husband.
  - Willis V. McCall, sheriff of Lake County, who shot one and wounded another of the Groveland Four while they were in his custody
- Randy Rhoads, American heavy metal guitarist, killed in a plane crash in Leesburg on March 19, 1982. Played in the Ozzy Osbourne solo band following his tenure in Quiet Riot.
- Ginger Minj, drag queen; best known for being a runner-up on the seventh season of RuPaul's Drag Race and competing on the second season of RuPaul's Drag Race All Stars

== See also ==
- Lake County Schools
- National Register of Historic Places listings in Lake County, Florida
