= Altoona, Florida =

- Census-designated place
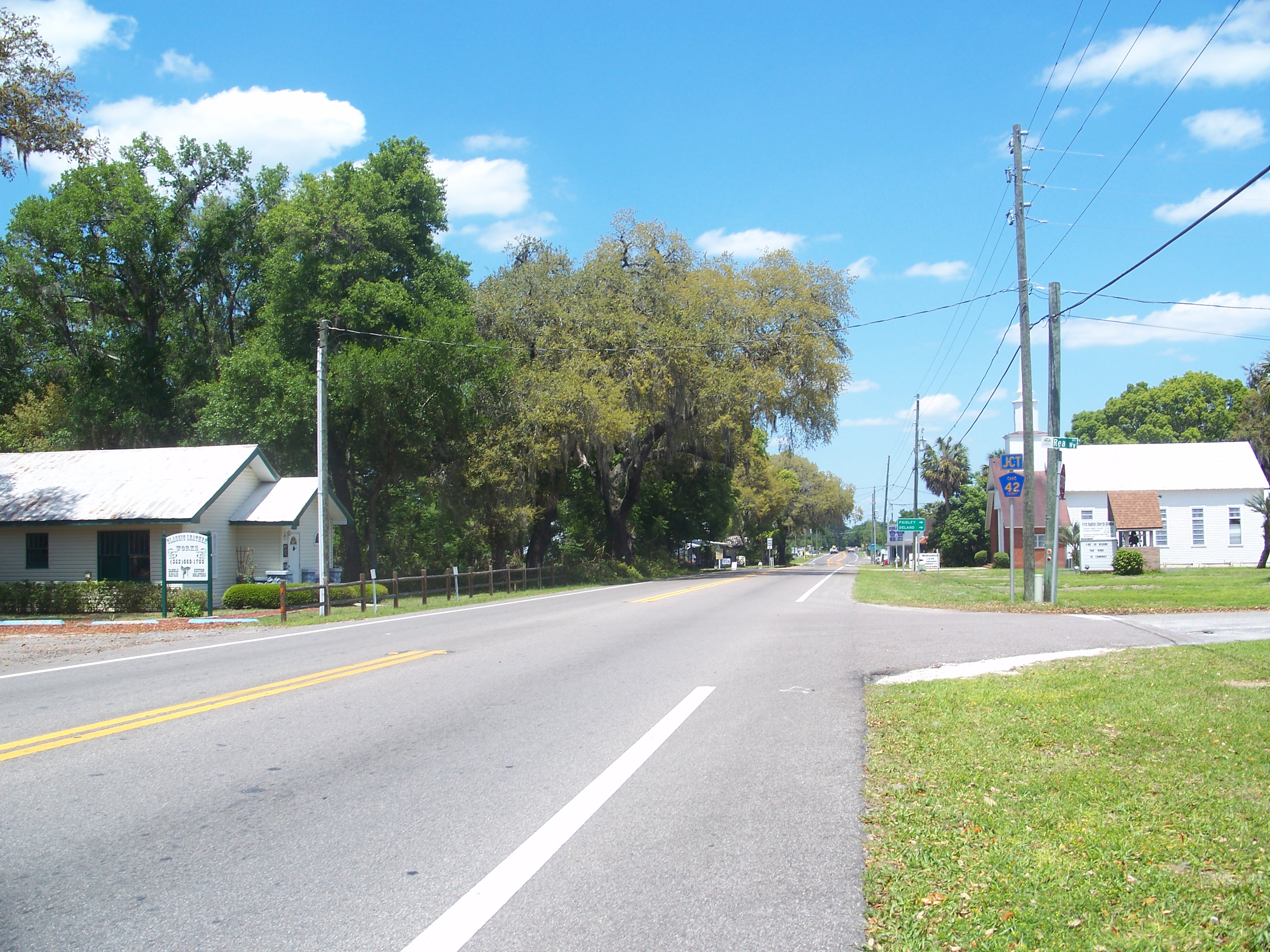
- SR 19, looking north towards the CR 42 intersection in April 2009

- Location of Altoona in Lake County, Florida
- Coordinates: 28°58′05″N 81°38′53″W
- Country: United States
- State: Florida
- County: Lake

Area
  - Total: 0.47 sq mi (1.23 km^{2})
  - Land: 0.45 sq mi (1.17 km^{2})
  - Water: 0.023 sq mi (0.06 km^{2})
- Elevation: 98 ft (30 m)

Population (2020)
  - Total: 98
  - Density: 217.7/sq mi (84.04/km^{2})
- Time zone: UTC-5 (Eastern (EST))
  - Summer (DST): UTC-4 (EDT)
- ZIP code: 32702
- Area code: 352
- FIPS code: 12-01050
- GNIS feature ID: 2402641

Altoona is an unincorporated community and census-designated place (CDP) in Lake County, Florida, United States. As of the 2020 census, Altoona had a population of 98. It is part of the Orlando–Kissimmee–Sanford Metropolitan Statistical Area .

== Geography ==
Altoona is located in northeastern Lake County. Florida State Road 19 passes through the center of town, leading south 8 miles (13 km) to Eustis and 14 miles (23 km) to Tavares, the county seat. To the north, SR 19 enters the Ocala National Forest and leads 55 miles (89 km) to Palatka.

According to the United States Census Bureau, the Altoona CDP has a total area of 0.47 square miles (1.23 km^{2}), of which 0.02 square miles (0.06 km^{2}), or 5.00%, are water.

== History ==
Altoona was either named after Thomas Jefferson Hinson's hometown of Allatoona, Georgia, or after Altoona, Pennsylvania, which was the hometown of Augustus Gottschee, the first merchant in this settlement. Altoona became an incorporated municipality on February 12, 1887. The town was abolished on May 27, 1899, following a fire that wiped out most of its buildings and reduced its tax base to near zero.

== Demographics ==
Historical population
Census	Pop.	Note	%±
2020	98		—
U.S. Decennial Census

As of the census of 2000, there were 88 people, 39 households, and 26 families residing in the CDP. The population density was 196.5 inhabitants per square mile (75.9/km^{2}). There were 49 housing units at an average density of 109.4 per square mile (42.2/km^{2}). The racial makeup of the CDP was 98.86% White, 1.14% from other races. Hispanic or Latino of any race were 1.14% of the population.

There were 39 households, out of which 20.5% had children under the age of 18 living with them, 61.5% were married couples living together, 5.1% had a female householder with no husband present, and 30.8% were non-families. 28.2% of all households were made up of individuals, and 2.6% had someone living alone who was 65 years of age or older. The average household size was 2.26 and the average family size was 2.78.

In the CDP, the population was spread out, with 19.3% under the age of 18, 8.0% from 18 to 24, 33.0% from 25 to 44, 26.1% from 45 to 64, and 13.6% who were 65 years of age or older. The median age was 40 years. For every 100 females, there were 91.3 males. For every 100 females age 18 and over, there were 102.9 males.

The median income for a household in the CDP was $27,143, and the median income for a family was $58,750. Males had a median income of $22,000 versus $40,417 for females. The per capita income for the CDP was $16,939. None of the population and none of the families were below the poverty line.
