= Ferndale, Florida =

- Census-designated place
- Location in Lake County and the state of Florida
- Coordinates: 28°37′34″N 81°42′11″W
- Country: United States
- State: Florida
- County: Lake

Area
  - Total: 2.81 sq mi (7.29 km^{2})
  - Land: 2.68 sq mi (6.95 km^{2})
  - Water: 0.14 sq mi (0.35 km^{2})
- Elevation: 89 ft (27 m)

Population (2020)
  - Total: 548
  - Density: 204/sq mi (78.9/km^{2})
- Time zone: UTC-5 (Eastern (EST))
  - Summer (DST): UTC-4 (EDT)
- ZIP code: 34729
- Area codes: 407, 689
- FIPS code: 12-22225
- GNIS feature ID: 2402480

Ferndale is a census-designated place (CDP) in Lake County, Florida, United States. As of the 2020 census, Ferndale had a population of 548. It is part of the Orlando–Kissimmee Metropolitan Statistical Area.

== Geography ==
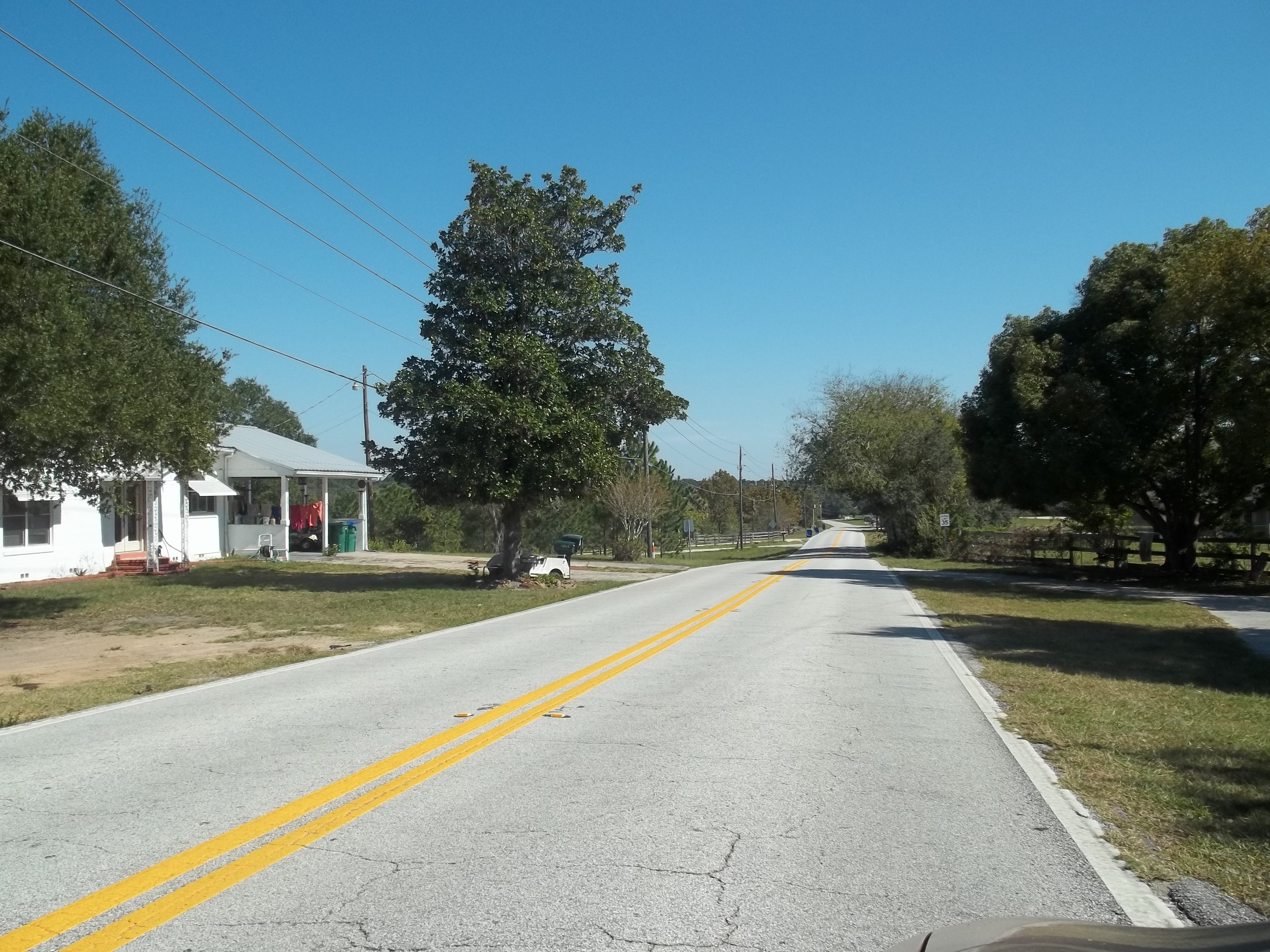
CR 455, going south through Ferndale

Ferndale is located in southeastern Lake County and is bordered to the west by the city of Minneola, to the southeast by the town of Montverde, and to the northeast by Lake Apopka.

According to the United States Census Bureau, the CDP has a total area of 4.5 miles (7.3 km), of which 2.7 square miles (7.0 km^{2}) are land and 0.12 square miles (0.3 km^{2}), or 4.74%, are water.

== Demographics ==
Historical population
Census	Pop.	Note	%±
2020	548		—
U.S. Decennial Census

As of the census of 2000, there were 233 people, 83 households, and 68 families residing in the CDP. The population density was 85.3 inhabitants per square mile (32.9/km^{2}). There were 91 housing units at an average density of 33.3 per square mile (12.9/km^{2}). The racial makeup of the CDP was 97.42% White, 0.43% African American, 1.72% from other races, and 0.43% from two or more races. Hispanic or Latino of any race were 3.86% of the population.

There were 83 households, out of which 34.9% had children under the age of 18 living with them, 67.5% were married couples living together, 10.8% had a female householder with no husband present, and 16.9% were non-families. 10.8% of all households were made up of individuals, and 6.0% had someone living alone who was 65 years of age or older. The average household size was 2.81 and the average family size was 3.04.

In the CDP, the population was spread out, with 26.2% under the age of 18, 9.4% from 18 to 24, 28.8% from 25 to 44, 27.0% from 45 to 64, and 8.6% who were 65 years of age or older. The median age was 36 years. For every 100 females, there were 97.5 males. For every 100 females age 18 and over, there were 95.5 males.

The median income for a household in the CDP was $54,271, and the median income for a family was $53,125. Males had a median income of $36,750 versus $25,875 for females. The per capita income for the CDP was $18,206. None of the population or families were below the poverty line.
