= Astatula, Florida =

Town in Florida, United States

- Town
- Town of Astatula
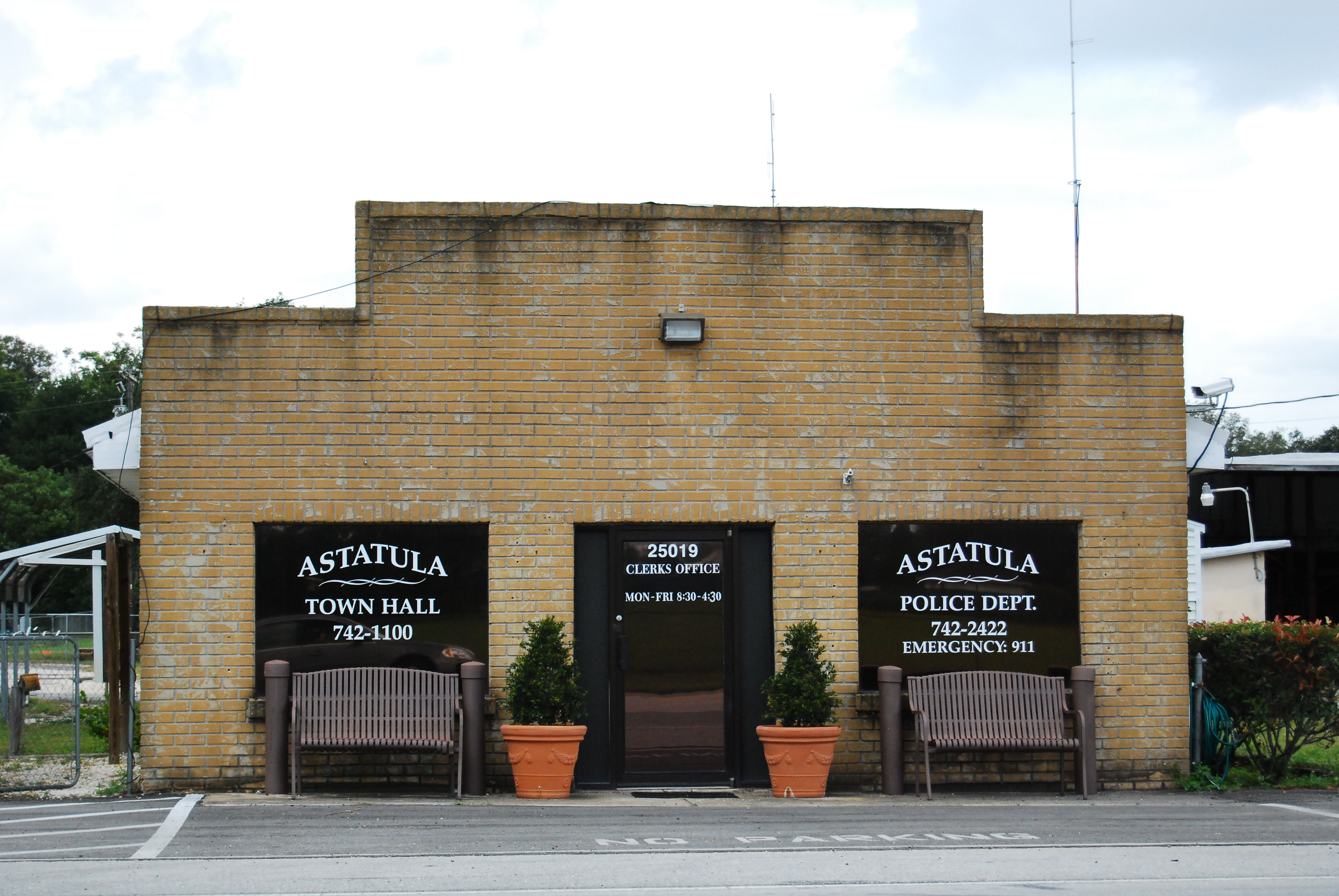
- Astatula Town Hall & Police Department

- Seal

- Location in Lake County, Florida
- Coordinates: 28°41′53″N 81°44′45″W
- Country: United States
- State: Florida
- County: Lake
- Settled: 1872
- Incorporated: May 4, 1927

Government
  - Type: Mayor-Council
  - Mayor: Zane Teeters, Jr.
  - Vice Mayor: Cheryl Marinelli
  - Council Members: Susan Richert, Kim Hanawalt, and Kay MacQueen
  - Town Clerk: Charles Jacien
  - Town Attorney: David Langley

Area
  - Total: 3.16 sq mi (8.19 km^{2})
  - Land: 3.13 sq mi (8.10 km^{2})
  - Water: 0.035 sq mi (0.09 km^{2})
- Elevation: 89 ft (27 m)

Population (2020)
  - Total: 1,889
  - Density: 604.1/sq mi (233.26/km^{2})
- Time zone: UTC-5 (Eastern (EST))
  - Summer (DST): UTC-4 (EDT)
- ZIP code: 34705
- Area code: 352
- FIPS code: 12-02250
- GNIS feature ID: 2405177
- Website: www.townofastatula.com

Astatula is a town in Lake County, Florida, United States. The population was 1,889 at the 2020 census. It is part of the Orlando–Kissimmee–Sanford Metropolitan Statistical Area.

== Geography ==
Astatula is located in central Lake County on the east side of Little Lake Harris. County Road 561 (Monroe Street) is the main road through the town; it leads north 8 miles (13 km) to Tavares, the county seat, and south 7 miles (11 km) to U.S. Route 27 near Minneola.

According to the United States Census Bureau, Astatula has a total area of 3.2 square miles (8.2 km^{2}), of which 0.03 square miles (0.09 km^{2}), or 1.12%, are water.

=== Climate ===
The climate in this area is characterized by hot, humid summers and generally mild winters. According to the Köppen climate classification, the Town of Astatula has a humid subtropical climate zone (Cfa).

== Demographics ==
Historical population
Census	Pop.	Note	%±
1930	167		—
1940	153		−8.4%
1950	255		66.7%
1960	357		40.0%
1970	388		8.7%
1980	755		94.6%
1990	995		31.8%
2000	1,388		39.5%
2010	1,810		30.4%
2020	1,889		4.4%
U.S. Decennial Census

=== Racial and ethnic composition ===
Astatula racial composition (Hispanics excluded from racial categories) (NH = Non-Hispanic)
Race	Pop 2010	Pop 2020	% 2010	% 2020
White (NH)	1,238	1,161	68.40%	61.46%
Black or African American (NH)	31	39	1.71%	2.06%
Native American or Alaska Native (NH)	5	6	0.28%	0.32%
Asian (NH)	21	11	1.16%	0.58%
Pacific Islander or Native Hawaiian (NH)	4	2	0.22%	0.11%
Some other race (NH)	0	4	0.00%	0.21%
Two or more races/Multiracial (NH)	27	58	1.49%	3.07%
Hispanic or Latino (any race)	484	608	26.74%	32.19%
Total	1,810	1,889	100.00%	100.00%

=== 2020 census ===
As of the 2020 census, Astatula had a population of 1,889. The median age was 42.3 years. 22.0% of residents were under the age of 18 and 18.0% of residents were 65 years of age or older. For every 100 females there were 108.3 males, and for every 100 females age 18 and over there were 103.5 males age 18 and over.

0.0% of residents lived in urban areas, while 100.0% lived in rural areas.

There were 672 households in Astatula, of which 36.5% had children under the age of 18 living in them. Of all households, 48.2% were married-couple households, 20.8% were households with a male householder and no spouse or partner present, and 21.1% were households with a female householder and no spouse or partner present. About 17.7% of all households were made up of individuals and 8.8% had someone living alone who was 65 years of age or older.

There were 781 housing units, of which 14.0% were vacant. The homeowner vacancy rate was 2.8% and the rental vacancy rate was 6.6%.

According to the 2020 American Community Survey 5-year estimates, there were 539 families residing in the town.

=== 2010 census ===
As of the 2010 United States census, there were 1,810 people, 772 households, and 631 families residing in the town.

=== 2000 census ===
At the 2000 census there were 1,298 people, 482 households, and 359 families in the town. The population density was 593.7 inhabitants per square mile (229.2/km^{2}). There were 546 housing units at an average density of 249.8 per square mile (96.4/km^{2}). The racial makeup of the town was 84.36% White, 1.23% African American, 0.54% Native American, 0.31% Asian, 10.48% from other races, and 3.08% from two or more races. Hispanic or Latino of any race were 19.41%.

Of the 482 households in 2000, 33.2% had children under the age of 18 living with them, 60.0% were married couples living together, 9.3% had a female householder with no husband present, and 25.5% were non-families. 19.5% of households were one person and 9.5% were one person aged 65 or older. The average household size was 2.69 and the average family size was 3.09.

The age distribution in 2000 was 26.0% under the age of 18, 6.3% from 18 to 24, 29.4% from 25 to 44, 23.4% from 45 to 64, and 14.9% 65 or older. The median age was 38 years. For every 100 females, there were 92.9 males. For every 100 females age 18 and over, there were 95.5 males.

In 2000, the median household income was $31,625 and the median family income was $33,393. Males had a median income of $26,602 versus $20,313 for females. The per capita income for the town was $15,832. About 6.8% of families and 8.0% of the population were below the poverty line, including 9.6% of those under age 18 and 4.9% of those age 65 or over.
