= Mascotte, Florida =

- City
- City of Mascotte
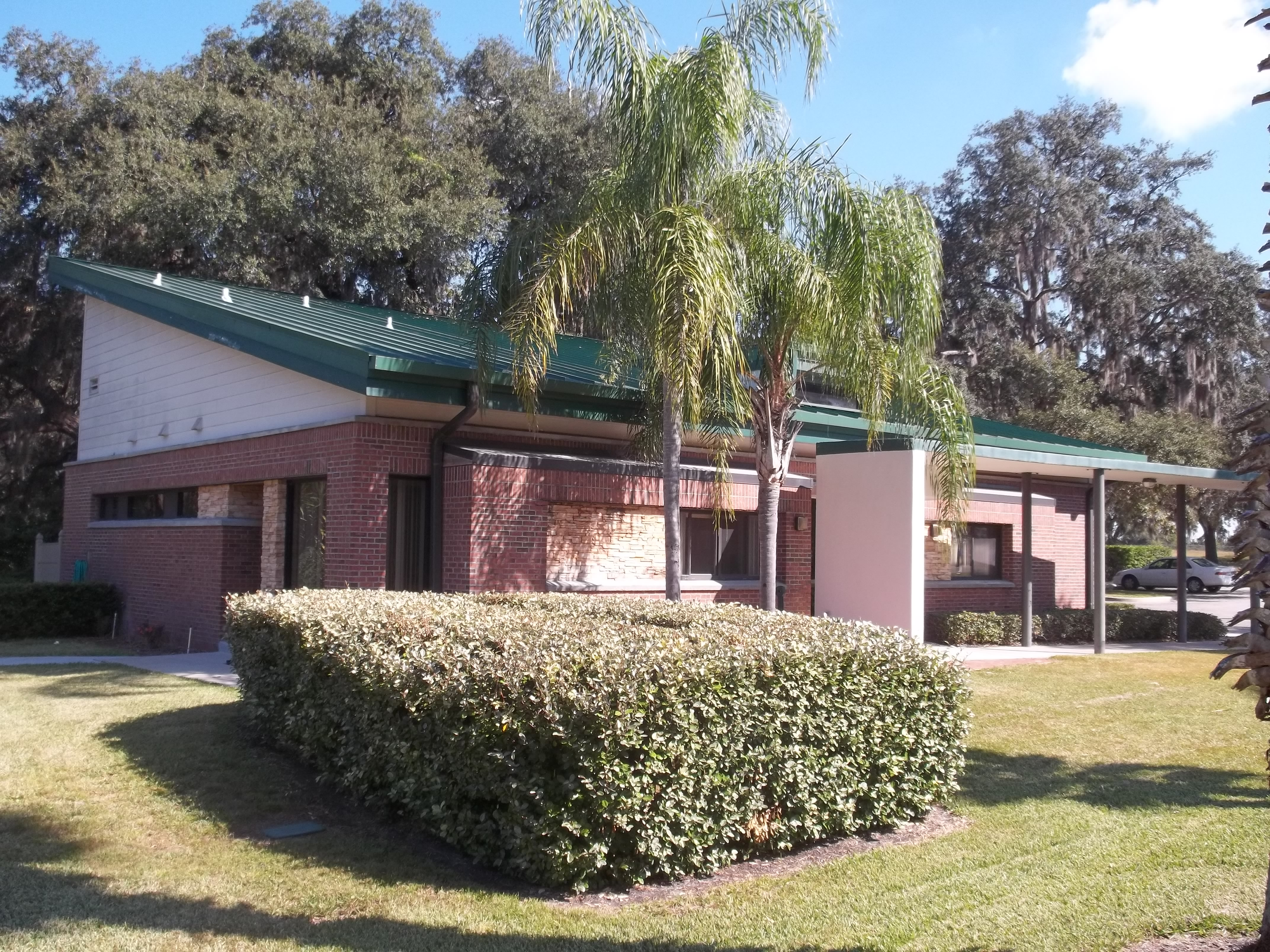
- City hall

- Location in Lake County and the state of Florida
- Coordinates: 28°37′50″N 81°54′34″W
- Country: United States
- State: Florida
- County: Lake
- Incorporated: 1925

Government
  - Type: Council-Manager

Area
  - Total: 18.05 sq mi (46.74 km^{2})
  - Land: 12.39 sq mi (32.08 km^{2})
  - Water: 5.66 sq mi (14.67 km^{2})
- Elevation: 92 ft (28 m)

Population (2020)
  - Total: 6,609
  - Density: 533.7/sq mi (206.05/km^{2})
- Time zone: UTC-5 (Eastern (EST))
  - Summer (DST): UTC-4 (EDT)
- ZIP code: 34753
- Area code: 352
- FIPS code: 12-43425
- GNIS feature ID: 2405037
- Website: www.cityofmascotte.com

Mascotte is a city in Lake County, Florida, United States. As of the 2020 census, the population was 6,609, up from 5,101 in 2010. It is part of the Orlando–Kissimmee–Sanford Metropolitan Statistical Area.

== History ==
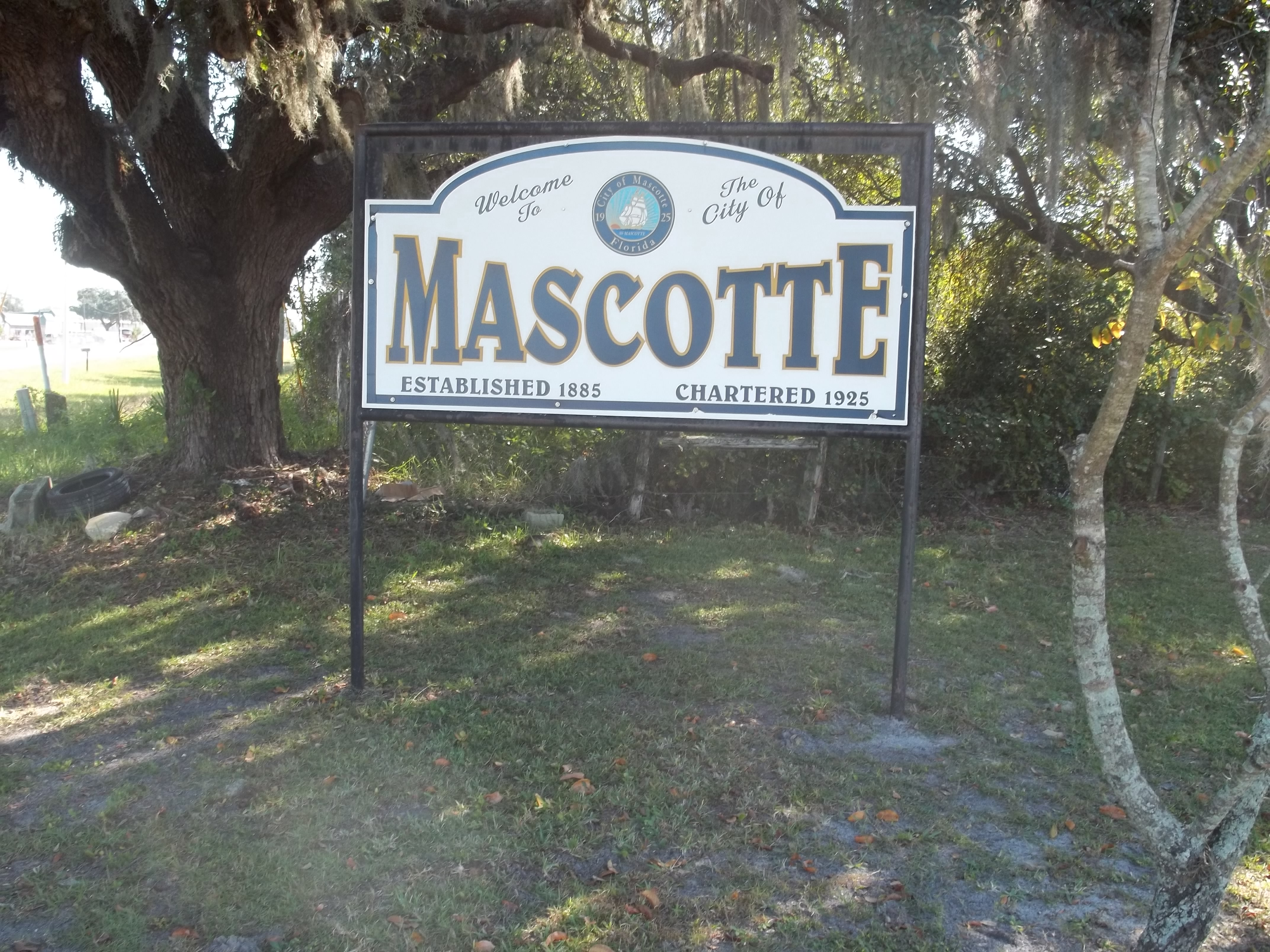
Welcome sign along FL 50 as it enters Mascotte

The city is named for the SS Mascotte, a ship that was used to haul tobacco from Cuba during the Spanish–American War owned by Tampa civic booster Henry B. Plant. The ship appears on the seals of both Tampa and Mascotte. There are numerous photos of the Mascotte in service between Tampa, Key West and Havana, 1886 through 1924, until sold north.

== Geography ==
According to the United States Census Bureau, the city has a total area of 2.8 square miles (7.3 km^{2}), of which 2.4 square miles (6.2 km^{2}) is land and 0.4 square miles (1.0 km^{2}) (13.83%) is water.

== Demographics ==
Historical population
Census	Pop.	Note	%±
1930	260		—
1940	239		−8.1%
1950	440		84.1%
1960	702		59.5%
1970	966		37.6%
1980	1,112		15.1%
1990	1,761		58.4%
2000	2,687		52.6%
2010	5,101		89.8%
2020	6,609		29.6%
U.S. Decennial Census

=== Racial and ethnic composition ===
Mascotte racial composition (Hispanics excluded from racial categories) (NH = Non-Hispanic)
Race	Pop 2010	Pop 2020	% 2010	% 2020
White (NH)	1,900	2,147	37.25%	32.49%
Black or African American (NH)	545	864	10.68%	13.07%
Native American or Alaska Native (NH)	19	34	0.37%	0.51%
Asian (NH)	71	153	1.39%	2.32%
Pacific Islander or Native Hawaiian (NH)	4	6	0.08%	0.09%
Some other race (NH)	47	86	0.92%	1.30%
Two or more races/Multiracial (NH)	104	230	2.04%	3.48%
Hispanic or Latino (any race)	2,411	3,089	47.27%	46.74%
Total	5,101	6,609	100.00%	100.00%

=== 2020 census ===
As of the 2020 census, Mascotte had a population of 6,609. The median age was 32.7 years. 29.7% of residents were under the age of 18 and 9.0% of residents were 65 years of age or older. For every 100 females there were 102.9 males, and for every 100 females age 18 and over there were 99.2 males age 18 and over.

79.9% of residents lived in urban areas, while 20.1% lived in rural areas.

There were 2,000 households in Mascotte, of which 48.6% had children under the age of 18 living in them. Of all households, 54.8% were married-couple households, 16.4% were households with a male householder and no spouse or partner present, and 19.8% were households with a female householder and no spouse or partner present. About 14.2% of all households were made up of individuals and 4.8% had someone living alone who was 65 years of age or older.

There were 2,091 housing units, of which 4.4% were vacant. The homeowner vacancy rate was 1.4% and the rental vacancy rate was 4.8%.

According to the 2020 American Community Survey 5-year estimates, there were 1,410 families residing in the city.

=== 2010 census ===
As of the 2010 United States census, there were 5,101 people, 1,358 households, and 1,103 families residing in the city.

=== 2000 census ===
As of the census of 2000, there were 2,687 people, 803 households, and 634 families residing in the city. The population density was 1,106.2 inhabitants per square mile (427.1/km^{2}). There were 858 housing units at an average density of 353.2 per square mile (136.4/km^{2}). The racial makeup of the city was 67.03% White, 4.21% African American, 0.67% Native American, 0.48% Asian, 23.67% from other races, and 3.94% from two or more races. Hispanic or Latino of any race were 43.92% of the population.

In 2000, there were 803 households, out of which 47.4% had children under the age of 18 living with them, 56.5% were married couples living together, 10.6% had a female householder with no husband present, and 21.0% were non-families. 12.6% of all households were made up of individuals, and 3.4% had someone living alone who was 65 years of age or older. The average household size was 3.33 and the average family size was 3.56.

In 2000, in the city, the age distribution of the population shows 33.2% under the age of 18, 12.1% from 18 to 24, 33.1% from 25 to 44, 16.0% from 45 to 64, and 5.6% who were 65 years of age or older. The median age was 28 years. For every 100 females, there were 120.6 males. For every 100 females age 18 and over, there were 131.4 males.

In 2000, the median income for a household in the city was $38,558, and the median income for a family was $40,483. Males had a median income of $24,139 versus $18,750 for females. The per capita income for the city was $12,346. About 10.8% of families and 15.7% of the population were below the poverty line, including 18.6% of those under age 18 and 10.4% of those age 65 or over.
