= List of crossings of the Halifax River =

This is a list of bridges and other crossings of the Halifax River.

== Crossings ==
Crossing	Carries	Image	Location	Coordinates
=== Florida ===
Granada Bridge	SR 40; Granada Boulevard		Ormond Beach	29°17′13″N 81°03′08″W
Seabreeze Bridge	SR 430; Seabreeze Boulevard; Oakridge Boulevard		Daytona Beach	29°13′53″N 81°01′19″W
Main Street Bridge	CR 4040; Main Street		Daytona Beach	29°13′21″N 81°01′06″W
Broadway Bridge	US 92; International Speedway Boulevard		Daytona Beach	29°12′57″N 81°01′19″W
Veterans Memorial Bridge	CR 4050; Orange Avenue; Silver Beach Avenue		Daytona Beach	29°12′40″N 81°00′39″W
Port Orange Causeway	SR A1A; Dunlawton Avenue		Port Orange to Daytona Beach Shores	29°08′53″N 80°58′32″W

== See also ==
- List of crossings of the Aucilla River
- List of crossings of the St. Johns River
- List of crossings of the Ochlockonee River
- List of crossings of the Suwannee River
