= South Dade Soil and Water Conservation District =

Local government district in the U.S. state of Florida

Special district overview
- Formed: May 11, 1982
- Jurisdiction: Miami-Dade County, Florida, United States
- Headquarters: Florida City, Florida
- Annual budget: $584,000
- Special district executives: Lovey Clayton; Thomas Lee Davenport; Louise King; S. Cooper McMillan; John C. DeMott
- Parent department: Florida Department of Agriculture

The South Dade Soil and Water Conservation District is a local government district in the U.S. state of Florida, responsible for advising the Florida Department of Agriculture and farmers on regulatory needs in the southern region of Miami-Dade County.

== History ==
The South Dade Soil and Water Conservation District was created on May 11, 1982 by the Florida Department of Agriculture, following a signed petition by ten percent of landowners in the district. It has remained a local government with small budgetary means and little responsibilities. Before Hurricane Irma hit South Florida in 2017, the District was in charge of routinely evaluating irrigation systems, while administering the Florida Organix bio-solid plant on behalf of the City of Homestead, but work since the storm has slowed down.

The District currently operates out of the U.S. Department of Agriculture facility in Florida City, FL. In 2017, its annual budget stood at $584,000.

== Composition ==
The District is managed by a Board of five elected Supervisors who serve four-year terms and are elected on the Tuesday after the first Monday of November in even-numbered years. As of 2018, the Board of Supervisors included:

- Lovey Clayton
- Thomas Lee Davenport
- Louise King
- S. Cooper McMillan
- John C. DeMott

=== 2018 Election ===
The next election for the Board of Supervisors of the District will be held on November 6, 2018, concurrently with the Florida gubernatorial election and the 2018 midterm elections. Three seats were up for election, but only one seat gathered enough candidates to schedule an election, with Jeremy Weinstock and Jose Vigoreaux, Jr. being elected unopposed in June 2018. Eduardo Ramirez Dominguez will be facing incumbent Lovey Clayton in the Group 1 election. While neither campaign has raised funds, the Libertarian Party of Florida has published a website criticizing Clayton for past ethical mishaps.

Eduardo Ramirez Dominguez has been endorsed by local officials, while the Libertarian Party of Miami-Dade County has launched a campaign to support his election.

On November 6, 2018, Lovey Clayton was re-elected for a second term, defeating Eduardo Ramirez Dominguez with 52% of the vote.

== Jurisdiction ==
Unlike most similar special districts in Florida, the SDSWCD does not encompass all of its home county, but rather only its largely agricultural districts. It includes the Cities of Homestead and Florida City, as well as several unincorporated communities. It is bordered by Southwest 112th Street and the Black Creek Canal to its north, the Atlantic Ocean to its east, the Florida Bay to its south, and the Everglades National Park to its west.

== Responsibilities ==
Based on Florida Statutes and local government rules, the SDSWCD has the following responsibilities and powers:

- Study the water and soil qualities within its jurisdiction;
- Advise the Florida Commissioner of Agriculture (currently Adam Putnam) on regulatory and legislative issues related to environmental and agricultural policies within its jurisdiction;
- Administer the City of Homestead's Florida Organix, a bio-solid plant providing compost to local farmers;
- Operate one of Florida's 14 Mobile Irrigation Labs, a public service providing irrigation advice and improvements to local farmers.

The District does not levy taxes, nor can it issue municipal bonds. Instead, it is funded entirely through public and private grants, and by its revenues from its agreement with the City of Homestead's composting plant.
