= Florida State Road 40 =

Highway in Florida, US

State Road 40
- SR 40 highlighted in red

Route information
- Maintained by FDOT
- Length: 91.832 mi (147.789 km)
- Existed: 1945 renumbering–present

Major junctions
- West end: US 41 in Rainbow Lakes Estates
- I-75 in Ocala; US 27 / US 301 / US 441 in Ocala; SR 19 in Ocala NF; US 17 in Barberville; I-95 in Ormond Beach; US 1 in Ormond Beach
- East end: SR A1A in Ormond Beach

Location
- Country: United States
- State: Florida
- Counties: Marion, Lake, Volusia

Highway system
- Florida State Highway System; Interstate; US; State; Former; Pre‑1945; Toll; Scenic
← SR 39A	→ US 41

State Road 40 (SR 40) is a 91.8-mile-long (147.7 km) east–west highway across northern and east-central Florida, running from U.S. Highway 41 (US 41) in Rainbow Lakes Estates eastward through Ocala over the Ocklawaha River and through the heart of the Ocala National Forest to SR A1A in Ormond Beach. Names of the road include Silver Springs Boulevard in Ocala, Fort Brooks Road from Silver Springs through Astor, Butler Road in Astor, and Granada Boulevard in Ormond Beach. Former sections in Ormond Beach are named "Old Tomoka Road" and "Old Tomoka Avenue."

== Route description ==
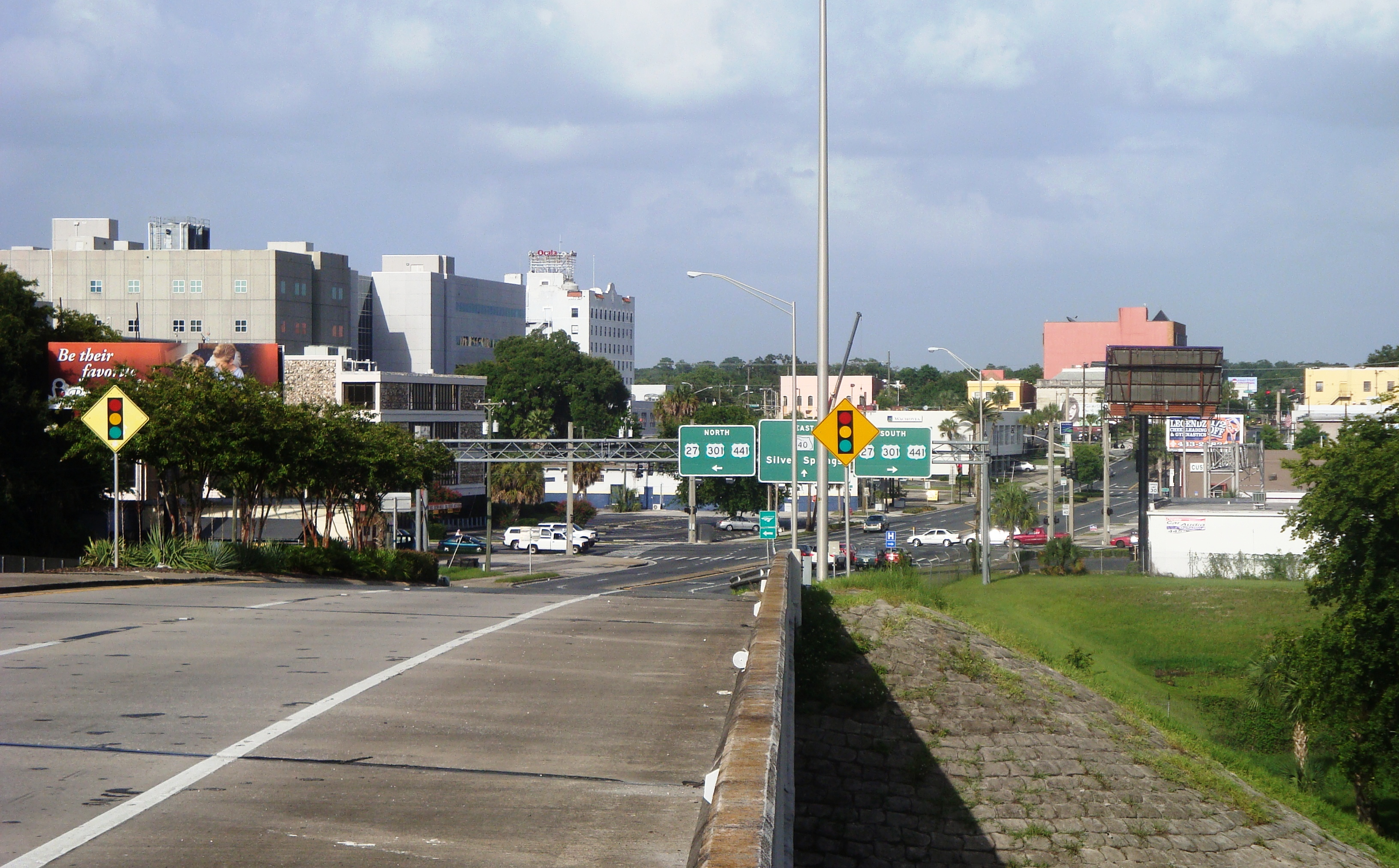
Eastbound SR 40 as it approaches US 27/US 301/US 441 in Ocala

The segment maintained by Florida Department of Transportation (FDOT) begins at US 41 north of the entrance to Rainbow Springs State Park, where it moves at a northeast angle before crossing under a narrow railroad bridge. The road passes by the Ocala International Airport before entering the city limits and crossing under Interstate 75 (I-75) at exit 352. East of I-75, SR 40 continues as a four-lane divided highway where it passes the site of the former Region #5 Headquarters of FDOT. CSX's S-Line, which once carried the Amtrak Palmetto runs beneath the road before intersecting with US 27/US 301/US 441. East of the intersection, SR 40 climbs a hill and passes just north of the Ocala Historic Commercial District, and south of the Ocala Union Station. At the intersection of Northeast 25th Street, SR 40 turns northeast where it gains a wide tree-lined divider. It passes along the northern edge of the Ocala Golf Club, then serves as the western terminus of County Road 314 (CR 314, Northeast 7th Street) and the eastern terminus of SR 492 (Northeast 14th Street), and later the Appleton Museum of Art, which includes the Ocala Civic Theatre.

From there, the divider ends as the road enters Silver Springs, Florida where it intersects with the northern terminus of SR 35 and southern terminus of CR 35 at the Silver Springs Nature Theme Park. Before the entrance to this park, a major segment of the Florida Black Bear Scenic Byway begins along the route. The road runs along the north side of Silver Springs State Park, where it serves as the eastern terminus of SR 326 and the southern terminus of CR 315, before it climbs the Bert Dosh Memorial Bridge in order to cross the Ocklawaha River, part of the Cross Florida Greenway and the Florida National Scenic Trail. Shortly after descending from that bridge, the highway intersects CR 314 for the second time, and then passes through Lynne where it intersects CR 314A, before bisecting the Ocala National Forest. Toward the eastern edge of the Juniper Springs Recreation Area, SR 40 approaches the intersection with SR 19. Immediately after the SR 19 intersection, the road crosses the Marion-Lake county line and runs along an overlook and camping area at Wildcat Lake. East of the intersection of CR 445 and CR 445A in Astor Park, it passes through Astor where it crosses the St. Johns River via the Astor Bridge. Immediately across the bridge, on the east bank of the St. Johns River, SR 40 passes through the unincorporated community of Volusia, one of the first European settlements in Florida, and the area for which Volusia, County was named.

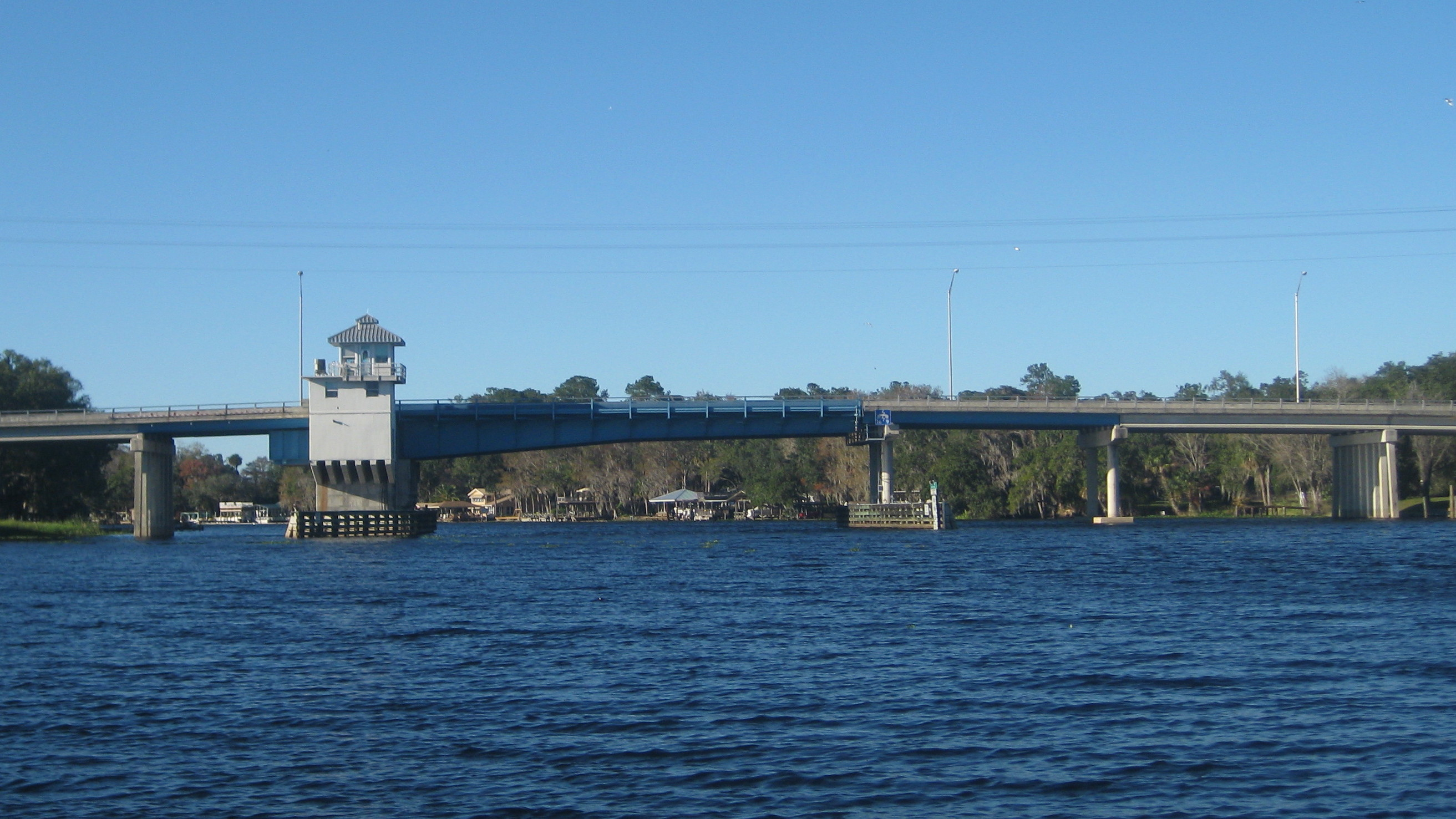
The bridge at Astor carrying SR 40 across the St. Johns River, between Lake and Volusia counties

As the road leaves Lake George State Forest and enters Barberville, it shifts to the northeast at the intersection of Lemmon Road, then intersects CR 3 and then the Barberville Flea Market and Post Office before a railroad crossing for the CSX "A" line a block west of the intersection of US 17. The road curves back east, and then northeast again as it passes along the south side of Volusia Speedway Park before the intersection of SR 11 in DeLeon Springs. From there, the road bisects the Tomoka Wildlife Management Area Union-Camp Tract and, after passing by some residential areas and intersecting Country Acres Boulevard, the road goes from two lanes to four as turns back into a divided highway. Despite officially entering the City of Ormond Beach, the highway runs along the north side of Tiger Bay State Forest and the Dan Rice Airport, but then becomes more suburban as it approaches the vicinity of the Tomoka River where the Florida Black Bear Scenic Byway ends just before I-95 at exit 268 which is a block away from CR 4009.

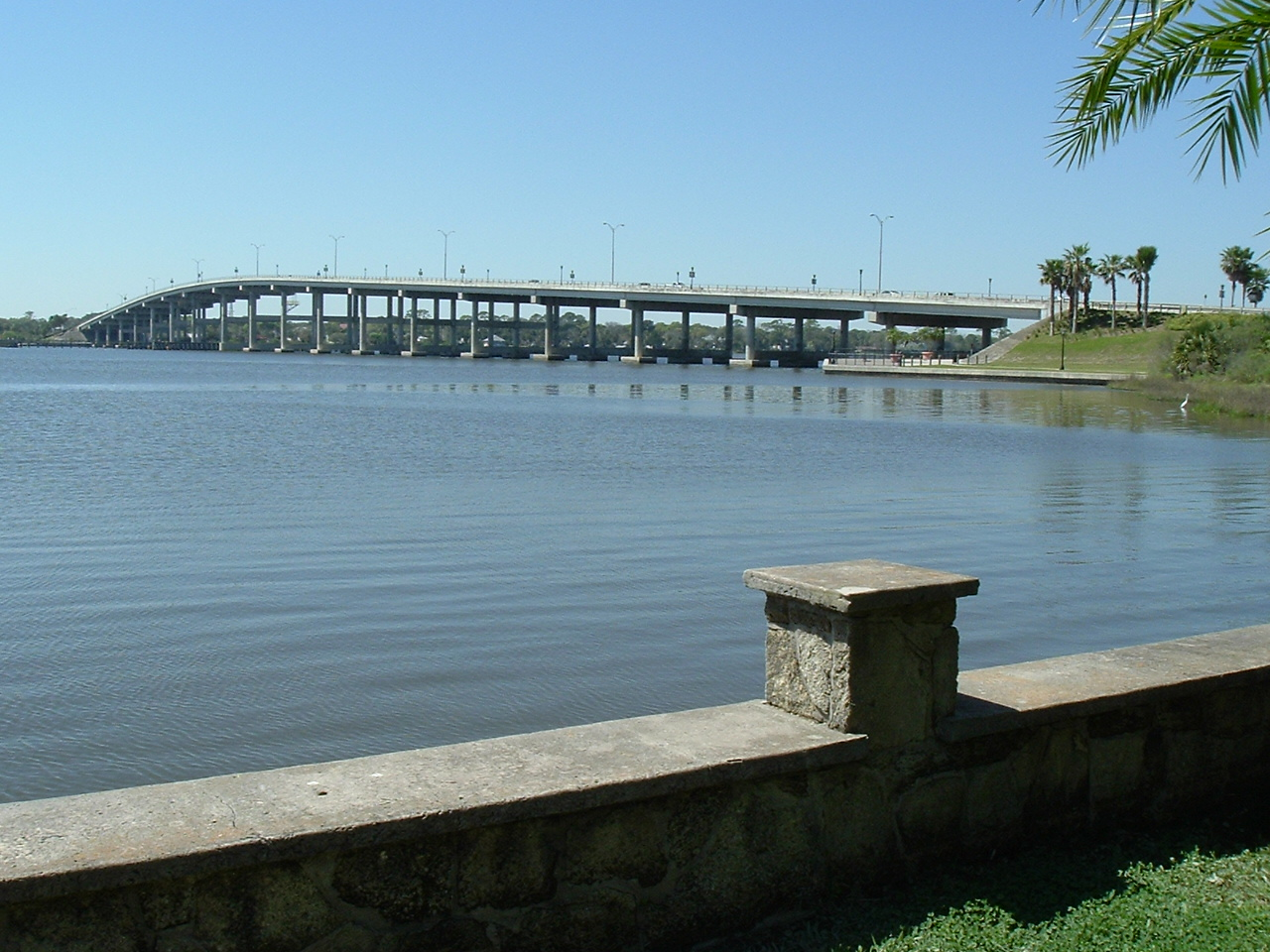
SR 40 crossing the Halifax River on the Granada Bridge

East of I-95 and CR 4009, the road curves northeast again as it runs along residential areas along the Tomoka River, until it curves east before crossing over a bridge over one of its tributaries, just west of the intersection of SR 5A (North and South Nova Road). The road makes one last left curve at Old Tomoka Avenue before approaching the grade crossing of the Florida East Coast Railroad main line, and then intersects with US 1 (North and South Yonge Street). The route continues, but the divider ends as SR 40 comes in close proximity to Ormond Beach City Hall on the southwest corner of Granada Boulevard and Beach Street (CR 4011). From there, SR 40 overlaps the Ormond Scenic Loop and Trail, where the divider begins again on the Granada Bridge over the Halifax River, and immediately intersects John Anderson Drive (CR 2803), where one leg of the scenic route heads north and West Granada Boulevard becomes East Granda Boulevard, before finally terminating at SR A1A. The other leg of the Ormond Beach Scenic Loop heads north on SR A1A. Despite the fact that SR 40 terminates at SR A1A, East Granada Boulevard continues as a beach access road.

== History ==
The route was established in the 1945 Florida State Road renumbering, replacing former state roads 16A, 81, 5, 16, and 19. As officially described by the State Highway Department at the time;

Beginning in Yankeetown Easterly via Crackertown and Inglis to a junction with SR 45 in Dunnellon then Northerly along SR 45 to a point approximately four and one half miles North of Dunnellon thence Northeasterly to intersection with SR 328 then Easterly to a junction with SR 500 and along SR 500 to the intersection with SR 200 and SR 25 in Ocala. Then Easterly via Silver Springs to junction with SR 15 at Barberville and South along SR 15 to junction with SR 600 North of DeLand and along SR 15 and SR 600 to New York Avenue in DeLand. East on New York Avenue and Southeasterly to intersection with SR 5 in New Smyrna Beach.

In the mid-1960s, the highway was extended to a new alignment east of Barberville towards Ormond Beach. The segment east of DeLand would later become part of SR 44. The two segments of SR 40A, would eventually be downgraded to two different county roads and later replaced by CR 4053 from DeLeon Springs to West DeLand and CR 4118 from the Longleaf Pine Preserve to New Smyrna Beach, both of which are in Volusia County. The section between Yankeetown and Downtown Dunnellon was downgraded to a bi-county road in 1977.

On May 14, 2024, the driver of a Ford Ranger pick-up truck collided with a bus carrying farm workers east of Rainbow Lake Estates, killing eight people and injuring 40 others.

Between December 2025 and January 2026, the Florida Department of Transportation began installing a series of animal warning and low visibility warning signs between Florida State Road 35 and the Astor Bridge. The project consisted of 80 warning road signs with solar-powered flashing yellow lights, four oversized variable-message signs, and nine cameras on concrete posts designed to monitor traffic and other activity along the road.

== Future ==
A proposed expansion of SR 40 resulted in the State Road 40 Environmental Feasibility Study, which reviewed potential impact of improvements to the existing highway while not destroying the natural beauty of the area.

== Major intersections ==
County	Location	mi	km	Destinations	Notes
Marion	Rainbow Lakes Estates	0.000	0.000	US 41 – Dunnellon, Williston	
Marion		9.763	15.712	CR 328 west	
Marion	Martel	13.368	21.514	CR 225A north (Northwest 80th Avenue)	
Marion	Ocala	17.42	28.03	I-75 – Lake City, Tampa	I-75 exit 352
Marion	Ocala	20.109	32.362	US 27 / US 301 / US 441 (South Pine Avenue)	
Marion	Ocala	23.962	38.563	SR 492 west (Northeast 14th Street / Bonnie Heath Boulevard) to I-75 north – Gainesville, Williston	No left turn eastbound
Marion	Silver Springs	25.804	41.528	SR 35 south / CR 35 north – Belleview, Silver Springs State Park	
Marion		27.326	43.977	SR 326 west to I-75 north – Gainesville	
Marion		28.394	45.696	CR 315 north – Fort McCoy, Orange Springs, Seminole Indian Community	
Marion	Ocklawaha River	30.01	48.30	Delks Bluff Bridge	
Marion	Nuby's Corner	30.886	49.706	CR 314 – Hunter Ed. Center and Youth Camp, Salt Springs	
Marion	Lynne	36.753	59.148	CR 314A – Hunter Ed. Center and Youth Camp, Salt Springs	
Marion	Ocala NF	52.168	83.956	SR 19 – Salt Springs, Palatka, Eustis	
Lake	Astor Park	57.014	91.755	CR 445A south – Alexander Springs	
St. Johns River		60.06	96.66	Astor Bridge	
Volusia	Barberville	66.362	106.799	CR 3 – Pioneer Settlement for Creative Arts	
Volusia	Barberville	66.522	107.057	US 17 – DeLand, Pierson, Crescent City	
Volusia		73.211	117.822	SR 11 – Bunnell, DeLand	
Volusia	Ormond Beach	85.593	137.749	CR 2813 north (Tymber Creek Road)	
Volusia	Ormond Beach	86.42	139.08	I-95 – Miami, Jacksonville	I-95 exit 268
Volusia	Ormond Beach	86.606	139.379	CR 4009 south (Williamson Boulevard)	
Volusia	Ormond Beach	87.966	141.568	CR 483 south (Clyde Morris Boulevard)	
Volusia	Ormond Beach	89.006	143.241	SR 5A (Nova Road)	
Volusia	Ormond Beach	90.351	145.406	US 1 (Yonge Street)	
Volusia	Ormond Beach	90.781	146.098	Beach Street (CR 4011) – Tomoka State Park	
Volusia	Ormond Beach	91.04	146.51	Granada Bridge over Halifax River (Atlantic Intracoastal Waterway)	
Volusia	Ormond Beach	91.832	147.789	SR A1A – Ormond-by-the-Sea	
1.000 mi = 1.609 km; 1.000 km = 0.621 mi: Incomplete access

== Related routes ==
=== State Road 40A ===
State Road 40A
- Location: Yankeetown–Inglis; DeLeon Springs–DeLand; Longleaf Pine Preserve-New Smyrna Beach

State Road 40A originally existed in three different segments, would eventually be downgraded to three different county roads two of which would later be replaced by CR 4053 from DeLeon Springs to West DeLand and CR 4118 from the Longleaf Pine Preserve to New Smyrna Beach, both of which are in Volusia County. The section between Yankeetown and Inglis was downgraded to a bi-county road in 1977, along with former SR 40 west of Dunnellon (see below).

=== County extensions west of US 41 ===
County Road 40
- Location: Yankeetown–Dunnellon

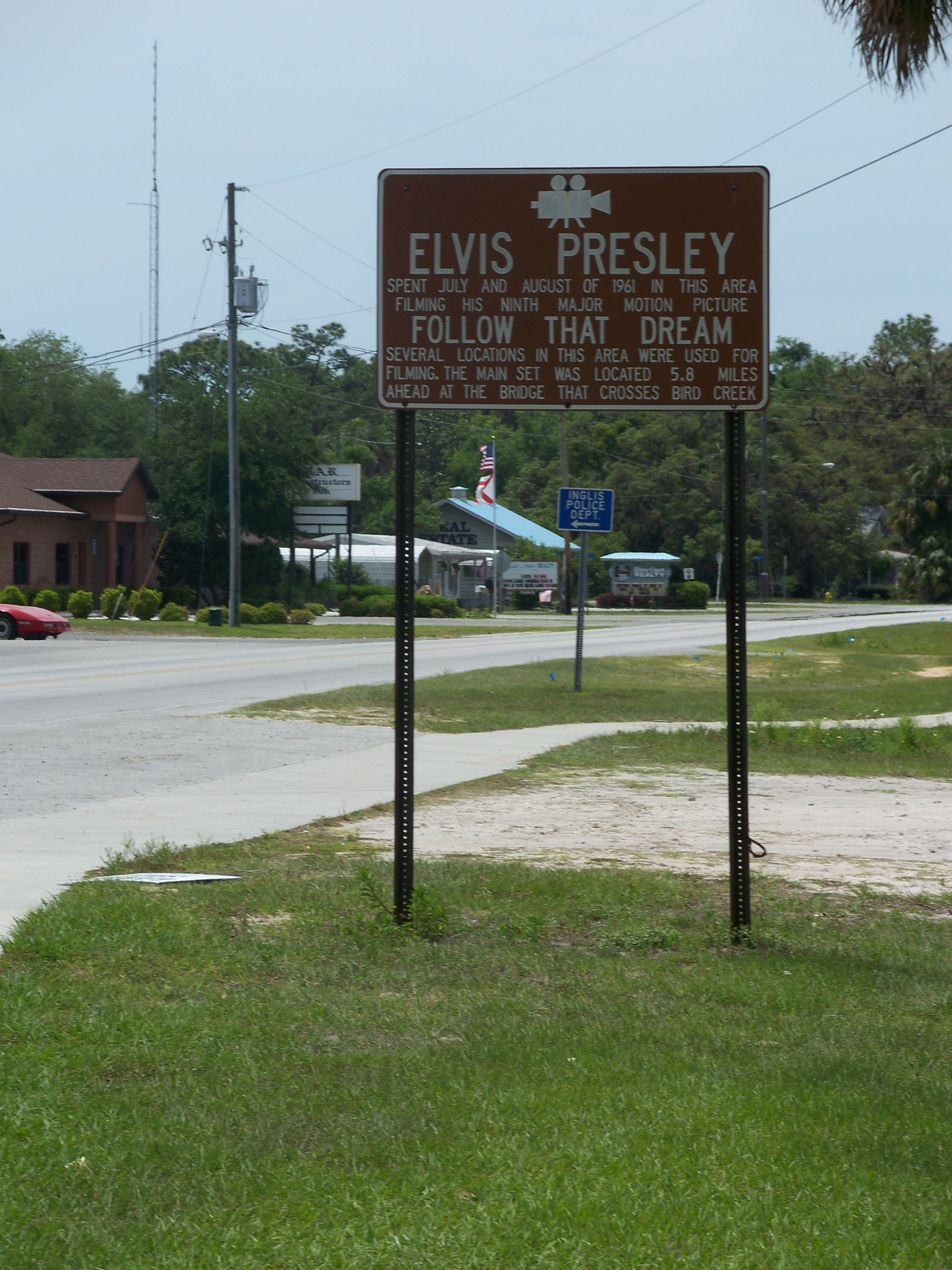
Sign along CR 40 memorializing the filming of the 1962 Elvis Presley movie "Follow That Dream" along the road in Inglis

County Road 40 (CR 40) is a western extension of SR 40 continues that from US 41 in Dunnellon to the Gulf of Mexico through Marion and Levy counties north of the Withlacoochee River. CR 40 is named Follow That Dream Parkway west of US 19/US 98 after the 1962 Elvis Presley movie that was filmed in Inglis, Yankeetown and the surrounding area. East of US 19/US 98, the road is known as Port Avenue in Levy County, and Cedar Street, then Pennsylvania Avenue in Dunnellon. Between Dunnellon and Rainbow Lakes Estates, SR 40 serves as a not-so-hidden route along US 41.

=== County Road 40A ===
County Road 40A
- Location: Yankeetown–Inglis

County Road 40A (CR 40A) in Levy County is a suffixed alternate of CR 40, along Southeast 193rd Place. It begins at the intersection of CR 40 and Allen Park Road and 63rd Street and briefly runs northeast until curving to the east where it runs mostly parallel to the north side of CR 40 into Inglis, where it moves further away from Follow That Dream Boulevard then terminates at US 19/US 98.
