= Lake George State Forest =

State forest in Florida, United States

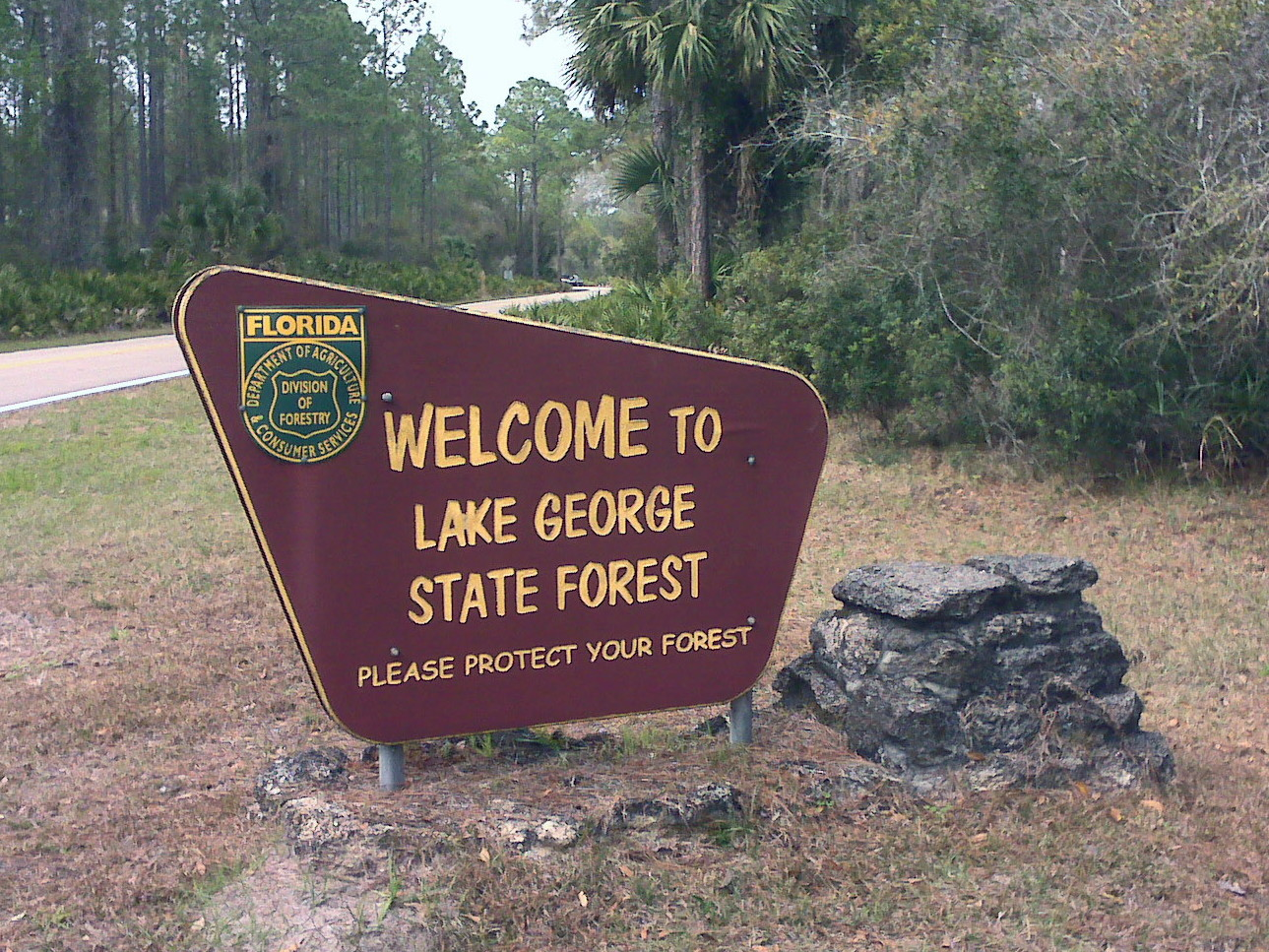
- Welcome sign near the community of Volusia, Florida

- Location within Florida
- Location: Volusia County, Florida, United States
- Nearest city: DeLand or Pierson (town)
- Coordinates: 29°09′20″N 81°26′20″W
- Area: 21,473 acres (8,690 ha)
- Governing body: Florida Department of Agriculture and Consumer Services, Florida Forest Service

The Lake George State Forest is a designated protected area and state forest in the U.S. state of Florida. The 21,473-acre (8,690 ha) forest is located in northwestern Volusia County, Florida, near Lake George and the communities of Pierson, Barberville, and Volusia. It is overseen by the Florida Forest Service within the Florida Department of Agriculture and Consumer Services.

Lake George State Forest is divided into three tracts of land. The northernmost Astor Tract stretches roughly from a point between Pierson and Lake George south to State Road 40 east of the Volusia settlement. South of SR 40 are the Mary Farms and Dexter Tracts, which encompasses land between the St. Johns River to the west, and Barberville, US 17, and De Leon Springs State Park to the east, and south to the banks of Lake Dexter, Spring Garden Creek, and the Lake Woodruff National Wildlife Refuge.

Lake George State Forest should not be confused with the Lake George Forest, a separate 7,858-acre (3,180 ha) property to the immediate north which is jointly owned by Volusia County and the St. Johns River Water Management District (SJRWMD), or the Lake George Conservation Area, a 11,973-acre (4,845 ha) site owned by the SJRWMD.

== History ==
Prior to European settlement, the area had for thousands of years been the home to Native American tribes like the extinct Timucua. They left behind a rich archaeological history in the form of large middens of freshwater shellfish, which they deposited along the banks of the St. Johns River and Lake George. The Bluffton Mound and Midden at the Bluffton Recreation Area in Lake George State Forest is one such example.

Lake George State Forest is formed from lands previously resourced for timber, production of naval stores, cattle grazing, and hunting. Cypress logging, by way of canals dug into the swampland, occurred up until 1910. The 1930s saw much of the land forested with longleaf and slash pine, or left in service of the Florida cracker cattle industry. After decades of aggressive harvesting, the 1960s saw reforestation efforts again plant slash pine.

Dry conditions brought on by severe drought led to massive wildfires in 1998, which left close to half of the forest charred and damaged. After efforts to salvage the area's timber, restoration again involved planting of pine seedlings.

== Natural features ==
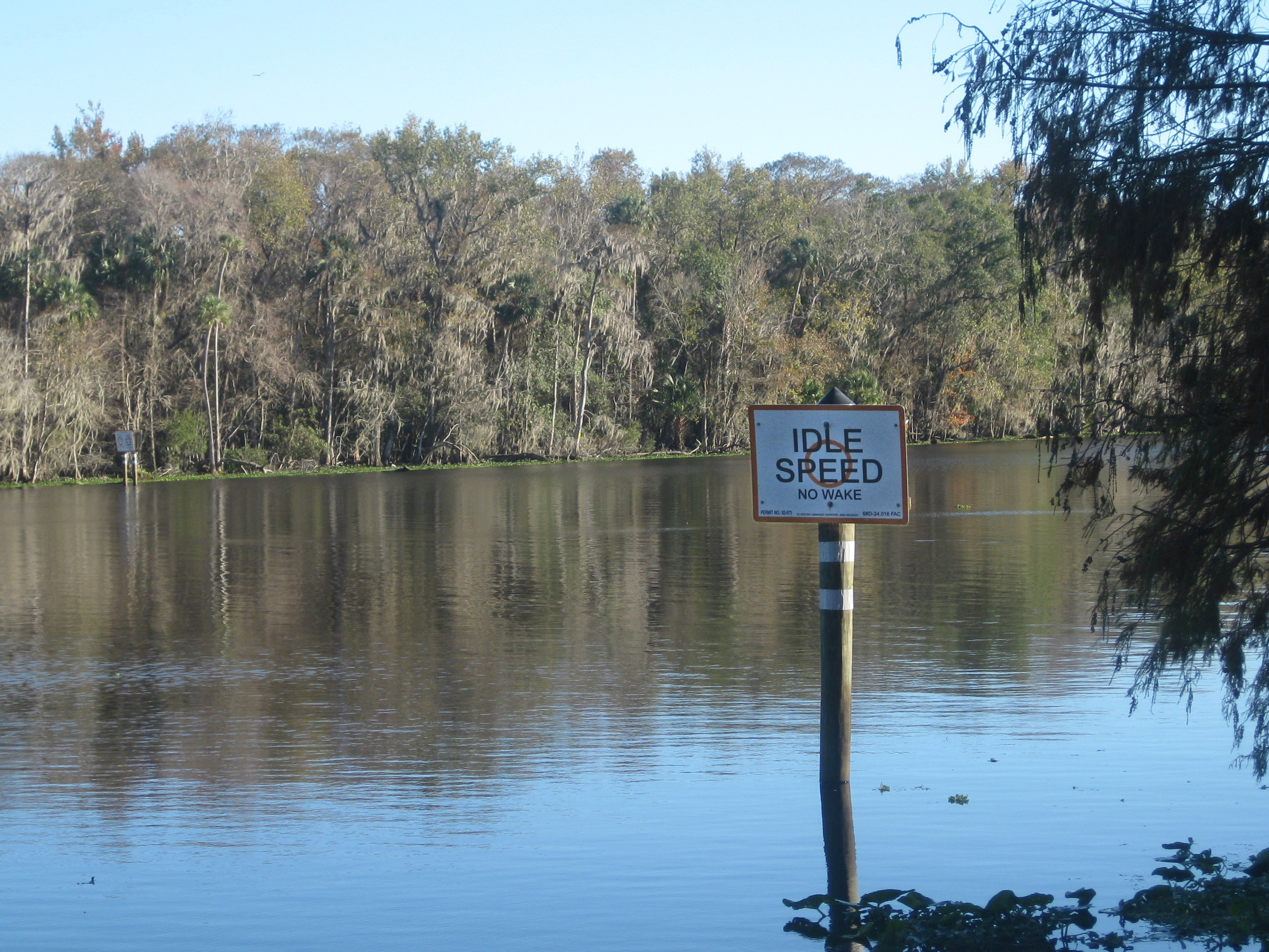
Lake George State Forest seen from across the St. Johns River in Astor.

Lake George State Forest is named for Lake George, the largest lake in Florida after Lake Okeechobee, and the largest lake of the St. Johns River system. The river itself bounds a 3.5 miles (5.6 km) section of the forest, offering both a vibrant ecology and a wealth of recreation opportunities. The forest and associated wetlands are located within the Lake George watershed, and as such, serve as an important aquifer recharge area.

The arboreal composition of the Lake George State Forest is primarily longleaf and slash pines, with bald cypress and other bottomland hardwood hammocks found in lowland deposits and along the floodplain.

Lake George State Forest is part of two Wildlife Management Areas (WMA) managed through the Florida Fish and Wildlife Conservation Commission. The forest's two southern tracts form the Dexter/Mary Farms Unit WMA, while the Astor Tract is grouped with adjacent land (like SJRWMD's and Volusia County's Lake George Forest and Conservation Area) to form the Lake George WMA. The WMAs of Lake George State Forest are part of a network of protected lands forming a wildlife corridor and roaming habitat which is critical to the survival of the Florida black bear. Other species of wildlife that call the area home include the bald eagle, sandhill crane, white-tail deer, wild turkey, gopher tortoise, and bobcat.

== Recreation ==
Numerous recreation opportunities are found at Lake George State Forest, including fishing (on the river, lake, and at Jenkins Pond), picnicking, and an interpretive nature trail three-quarter mile (1.21 km) in length. The fall and spring months bring great opportunities for migratory bird-watching, as the forest is part of the Great Florida Birding Trail.

No boat ramps are available within the State Forest boundaries, but community boat ramps are found nearby. Small watercraft such as canoes can launch from the river bank.

Visitors may access the forest during daylight hours. Roads, designated trails, and permanent fire lines are available for hiking, bicycling, and horseback riding. Primitive camping, hunting, and vehicle access is also possible by obtaining a permit from the State Forest Service.
