= Lynne, Florida =

Unincorporated community in Florida, U.S.

Coordinates: 29°11′33″N 81°55′02″W

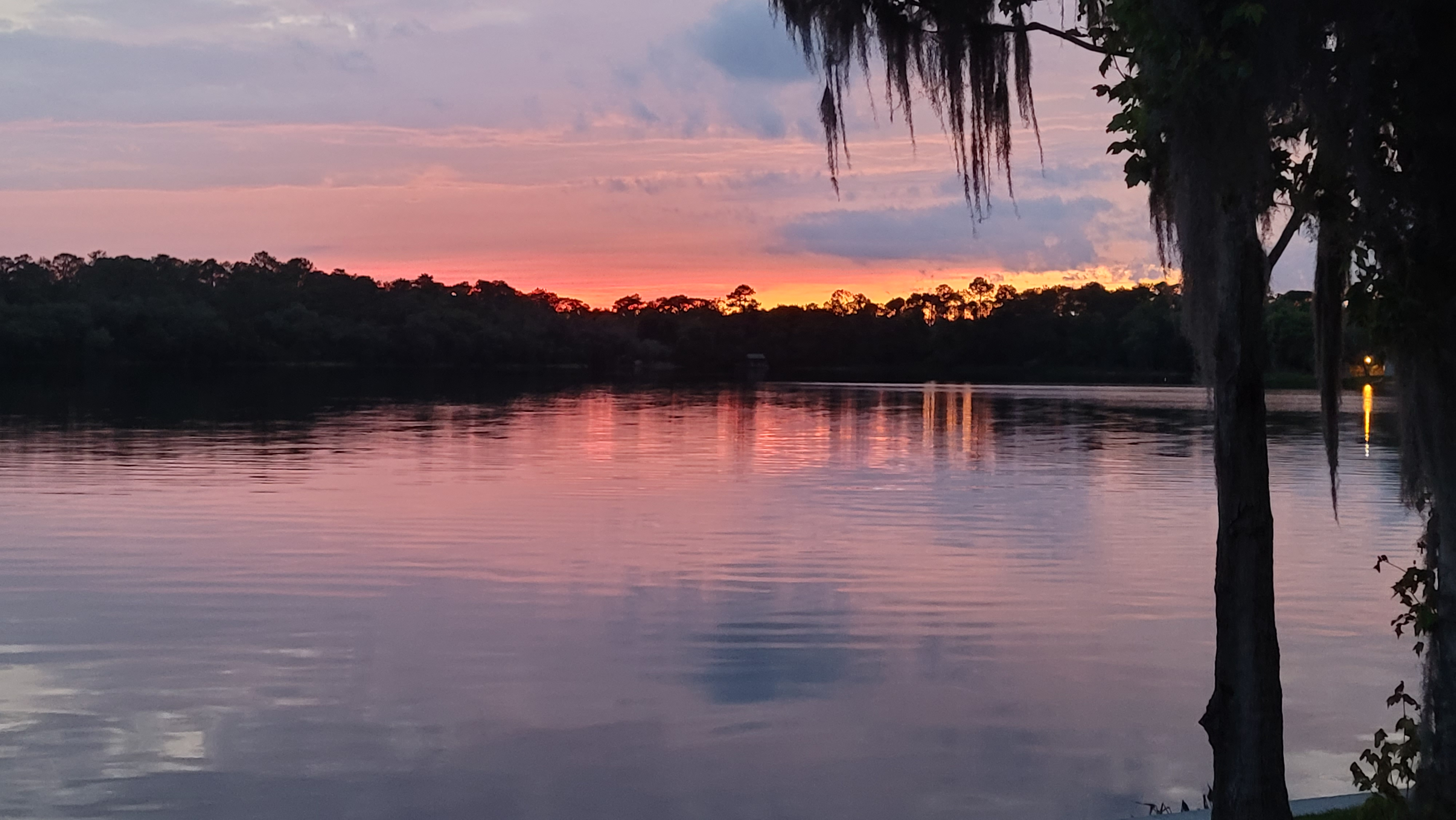
Church Lake in Lynne, Florida

Lynne is an unincorporated community in Marion County, in the U.S. state of Florida. It is located along Florida State Road 40 in the western edges of Ocala National Forest.

== History ==
A post office called Lynne was established in 1884, and remained in operation until it was discontinued in 1955. The community was probably named after Lynn, Massachusetts.
