= Granada Bridge (Ormond Beach) =

Structure in Florida, United States

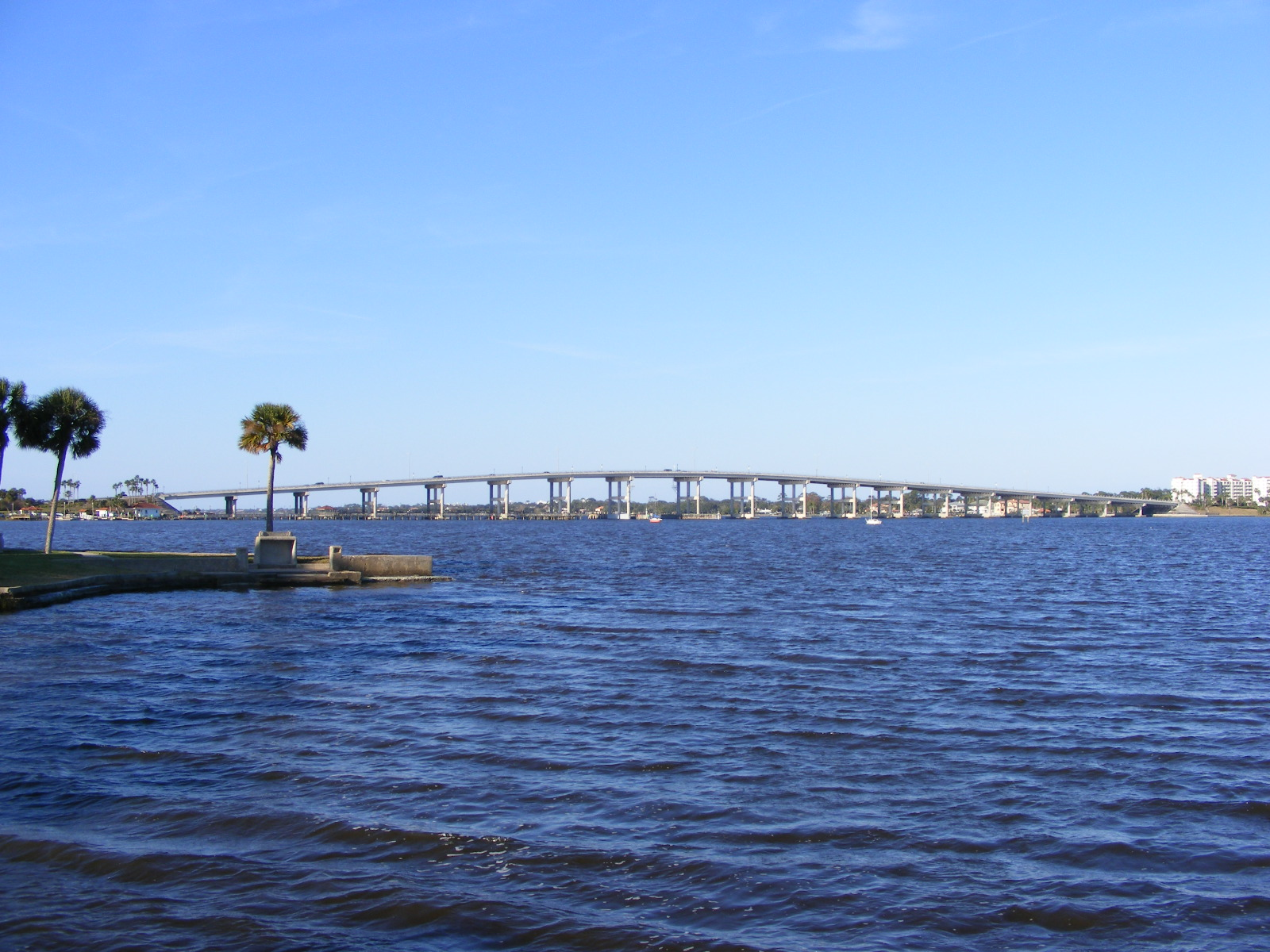
- Coordinates: 29°17′13″N 81°03′08″W
- Carries: Four lanes of SR 40
- Crosses: Halifax River; Intracoastal Waterway
- Locale: Ormond Beach, Florida
- Official name: Rockefeller Memorial Bridge
- Maintained by: Florida Dept. of Transportation
- ID number: 790132

Characteristics
- Design: Stringer/Multi-beam or Girder
- Material: Prestressed concrete
- Total length: 586.1 meters (1,923 ft)
- Clearance below: 19.8 meters (65 ft)

History
- Opened: 1887 (First Bridge); 1905 (Second Bridge); 1954 (Third Bridge); 1983 (Fourth Bridge)

Statistics
- Daily traffic: 35,500
- Toll: Free

Location
- Interactive map of Granada Bridge

The Granada Bridge is a high-clearance bridge that spans the Halifax River and Intracoastal Waterway, linking the mainland and beach peninsula parts of Ormond Beach, Volusia County, Florida. Granada Bridge carries four lanes of State Road 40 and Granada Blvd. The Casements, along with City Hall Plaza, Fortunato Park, and Riverbridge Park reside at the four corners of Ormond Beach's Granada Bridge, which give their collective name to the annual "Four Corners Festival" in Ormond Beach.

In September 1999, the bridge was crossed by about 24,000 cars every day. By January 2007, that number increased to approximately 35,500 vehicles per day.

== History ==
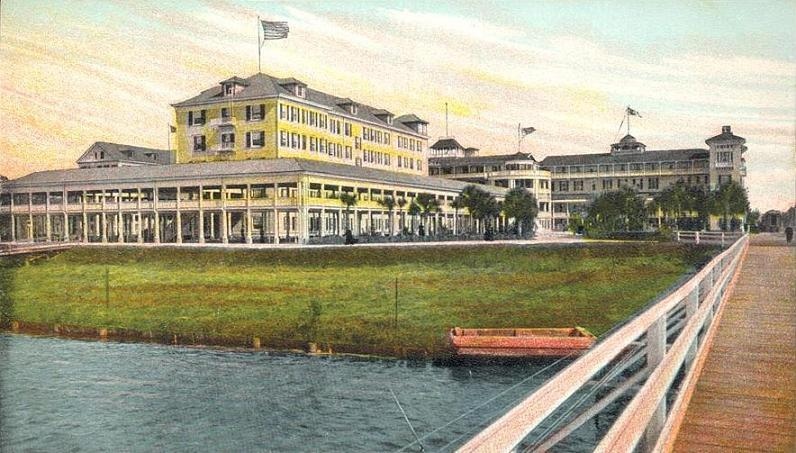
1905 Postcard of The Ormond Hotel; the first Ormond bridge can be seen to the right.

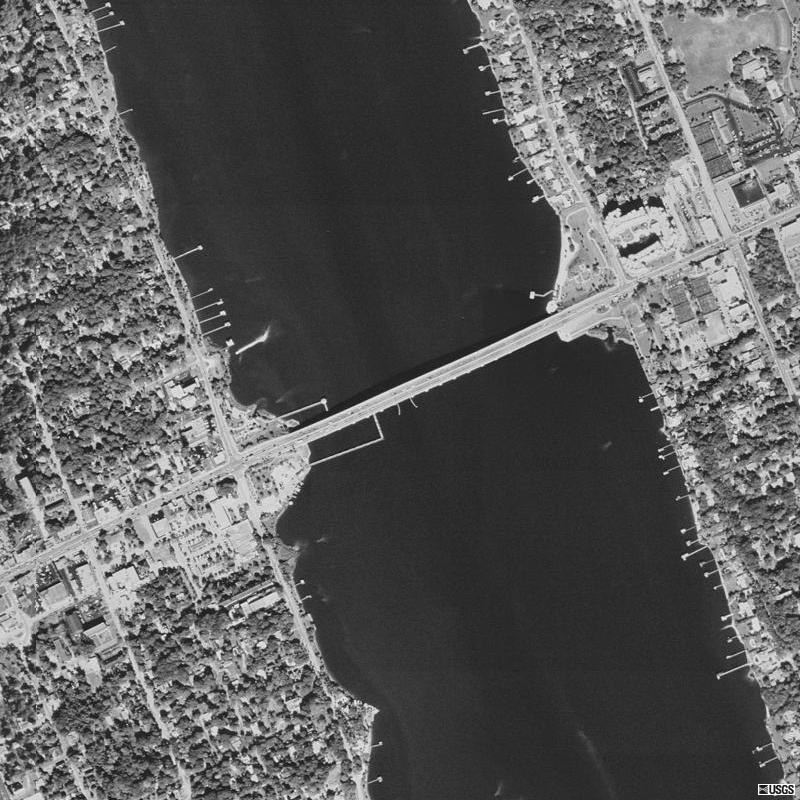
Aerial view of Granada Bridge in Ormond Beach

The Town of Ormond was incorporated March 22, 1880. There were few residents on the beach peninsula until 1886, when the St. Johns and Halifax Railroad reached the area. The railroad brought new visitors, which inspired John Anderson and Joseph Price to build the Ormond Hotel on the beachside. They also planned to build a bridge across the Halifax River so railroad passengers could walk to their new hotel.

=== First bridge ===
In 1887, Florida Congressman Charles Dougherty sponsored three bills, authorizing the building of bridges in Volusia County, across the Halifax River, St. Johns River, and Indian Lagoon. In that same year, La Vega, which itself was called New England Avenue in 1875, was renamed to Granada Boulevard. The towns of Ormond and Daytona competed to build the first bridge across the Halifax River. In 1887, Anderson and Price managed to finish their bridge in Ormond first. It was a simple wooden bridge, with a drawbridge device for boats to pass.

=== Second bridge ===
Florida East Coast Railway owner Henry M. Flagler bought out the St. Johns and Halifax Railroad, and bought into the Ormond Hotel. By 1890, Flagler bought out his partners' interest in the hotel and expanded it to 300 rooms. In 1905, Flagler built a second bridge near the first as a railroad spur so his trains could carry passengers directly to the resort. Later, Flagler had the railroad bridge redesigned so wealthy visitors could drive automobiles over it to the hotel. The first wooden bridge was demolished soon afterward.

=== Third bridge ===
The converted railroad bridge stood for many years until it became too old to be serviced. A newer, two-lane concrete bascule bridge (drawbridge) was constructed to carry Granada Boulevard. It was opened on March 2, 1954, and named the Rockefeller Memorial Bridge for Standard Oil billionaire John D. Rockefeller, who had made The Casements in Ormond his winter and retirement home until he died in 1937.

=== Fourth bridge ===
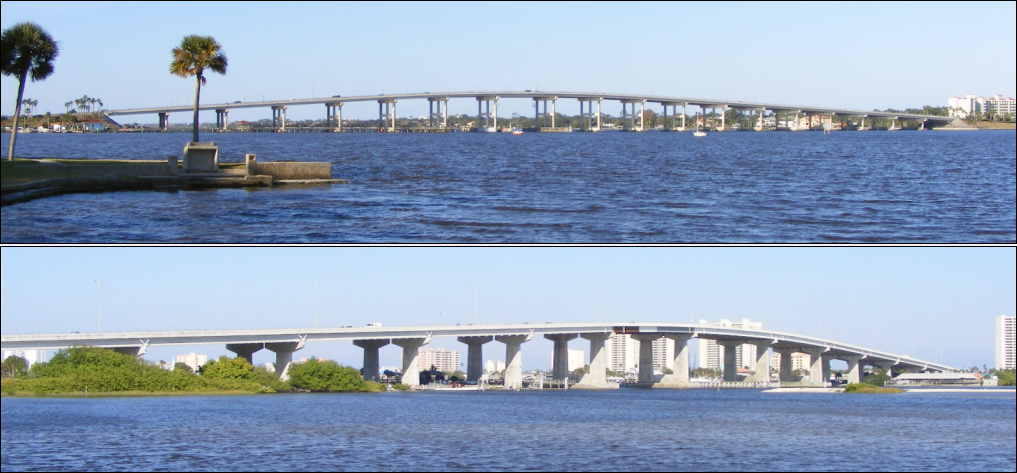
When funded in 1987, the 1990 built Port Orange Causeway bridge (bottom photo) passing over the Halifax River was planned to be similar to the 1983 Granada Bridge (top photo) passing over that same river.

The widening of State Road 40 in the 1980s created the need for a new bridge. During the construction of Granada Bridge, a platform collapsed and caused three workers to fall more than 60 feet onto a barge, with one falling to his death. The Florida State Department of Transportation was in charge of the bridge construction, and built the present four-lane high clearance concrete and steel bridge in 1983. In May 1987, the U.S. federal government agreed to provide $8.16 million of the estimated $12 million cost of building a Port Orange, Florida bridge planned to be similar to the Granada Bridge. The resulting bridge across the Halifax River, the Port Orange Causeway across the Halifax River, was completed in 1990.

In July 1997, a kitten named Lucky fell from a truck on the Granada Bridge and, after scrambling to safety from other moving cars, fell from the bridge. Lucky suffered a broken leg and acute kidney failure in the fall, and was rescued from a barnacle-covered piling by the U.S. Department of Transportation. His owners considered putting him down after learning of his bad shape and the expense of a kidney transplant. When Lucky's story was released to the public, donations poured in to help pay for the transplant. The survival of Lucky, whose name was changed to Timmy following the accident, was called "miraculous" by his attending veterinarian.

Bicycle lanes are marked in the shoulder of the span and two pedestrian walkways at the far ends. The bridge is part of the Ormond Scenic Loop and Trail, a Florida Scenic Highway, designated on July 9, 2007.

== Gallery ==
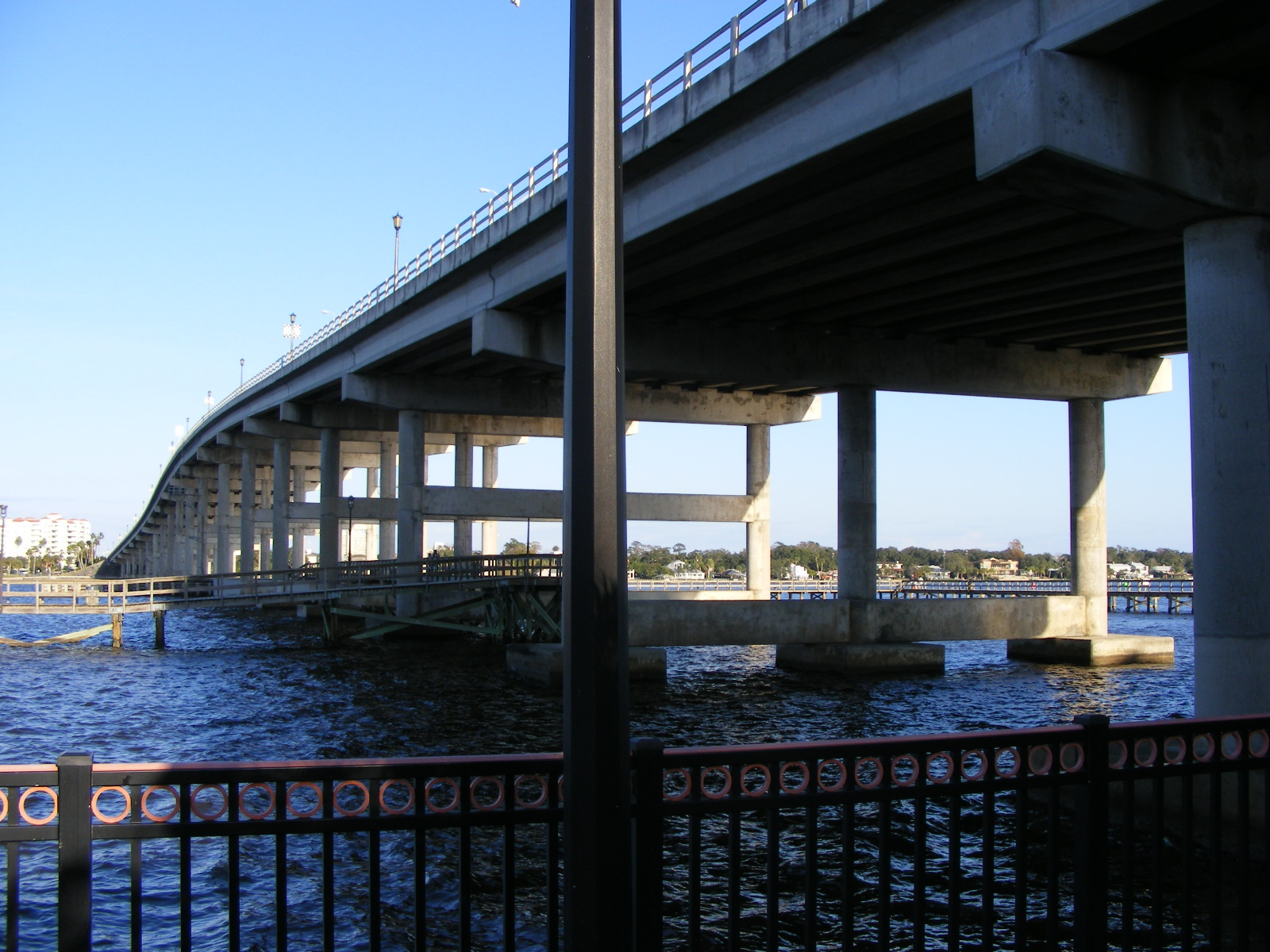
Under the bridge

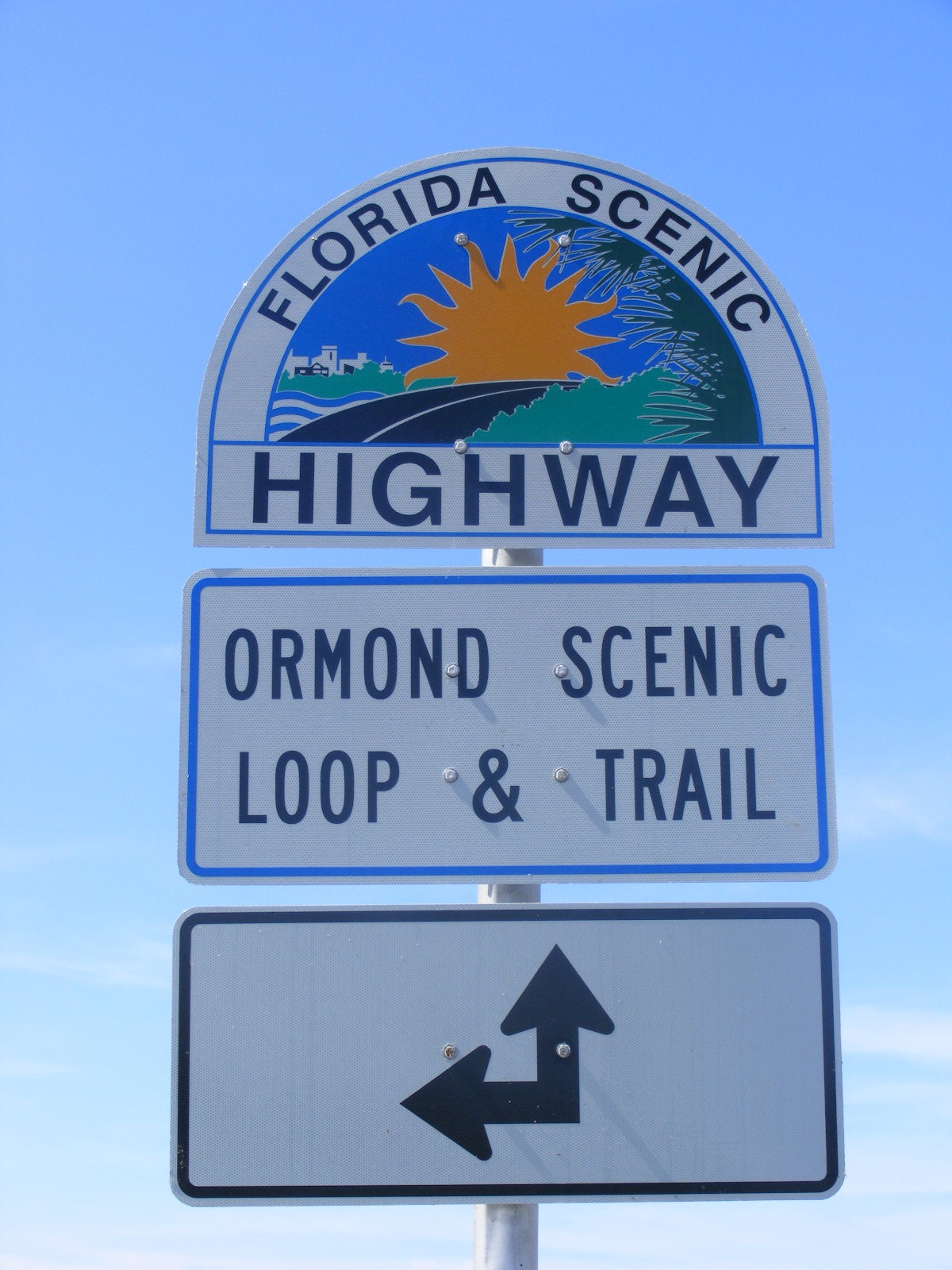
Ormond Scenic Loop and Trail

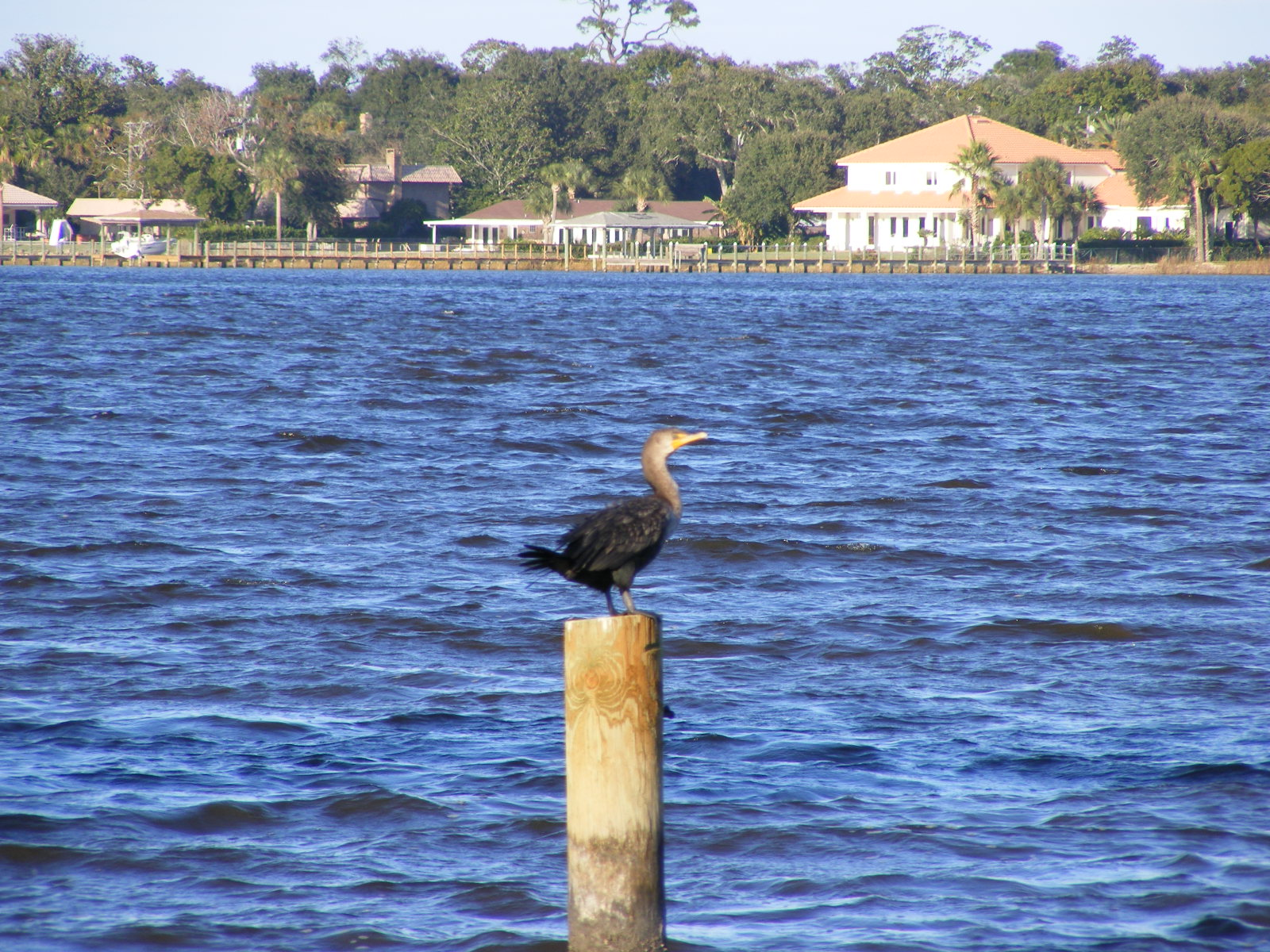
Double Crested Cormorant

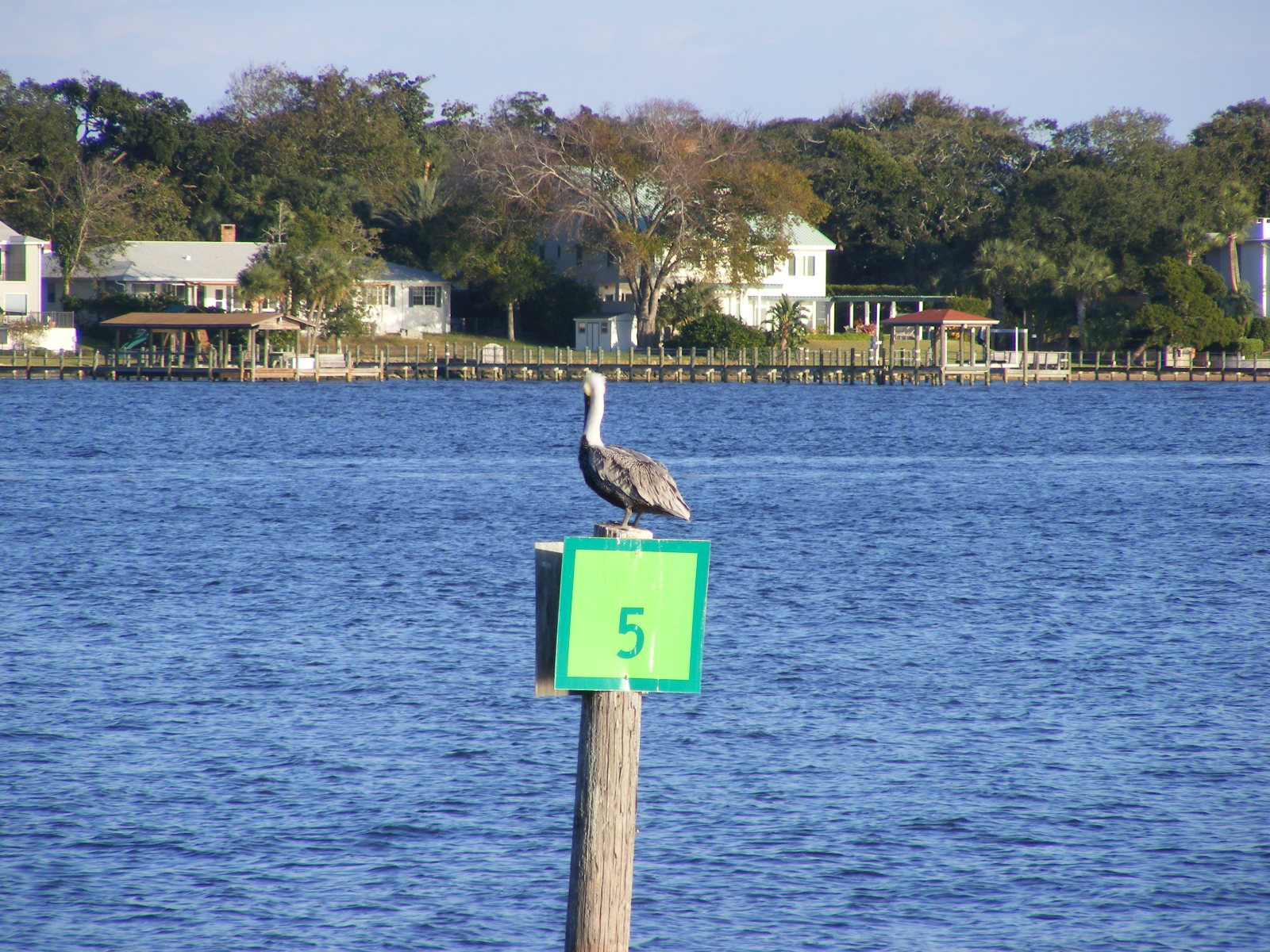
Brown Pelican

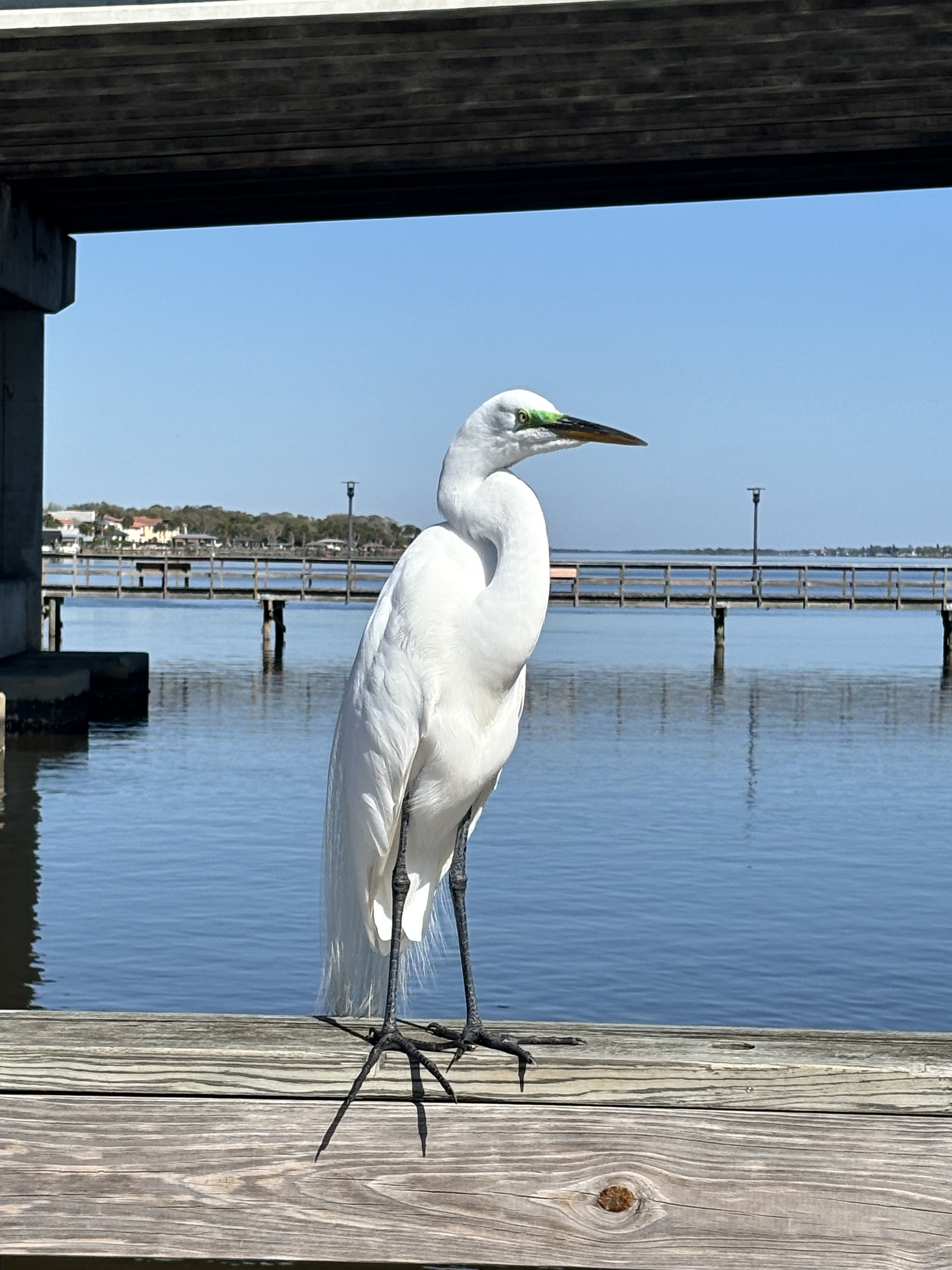
Great egret

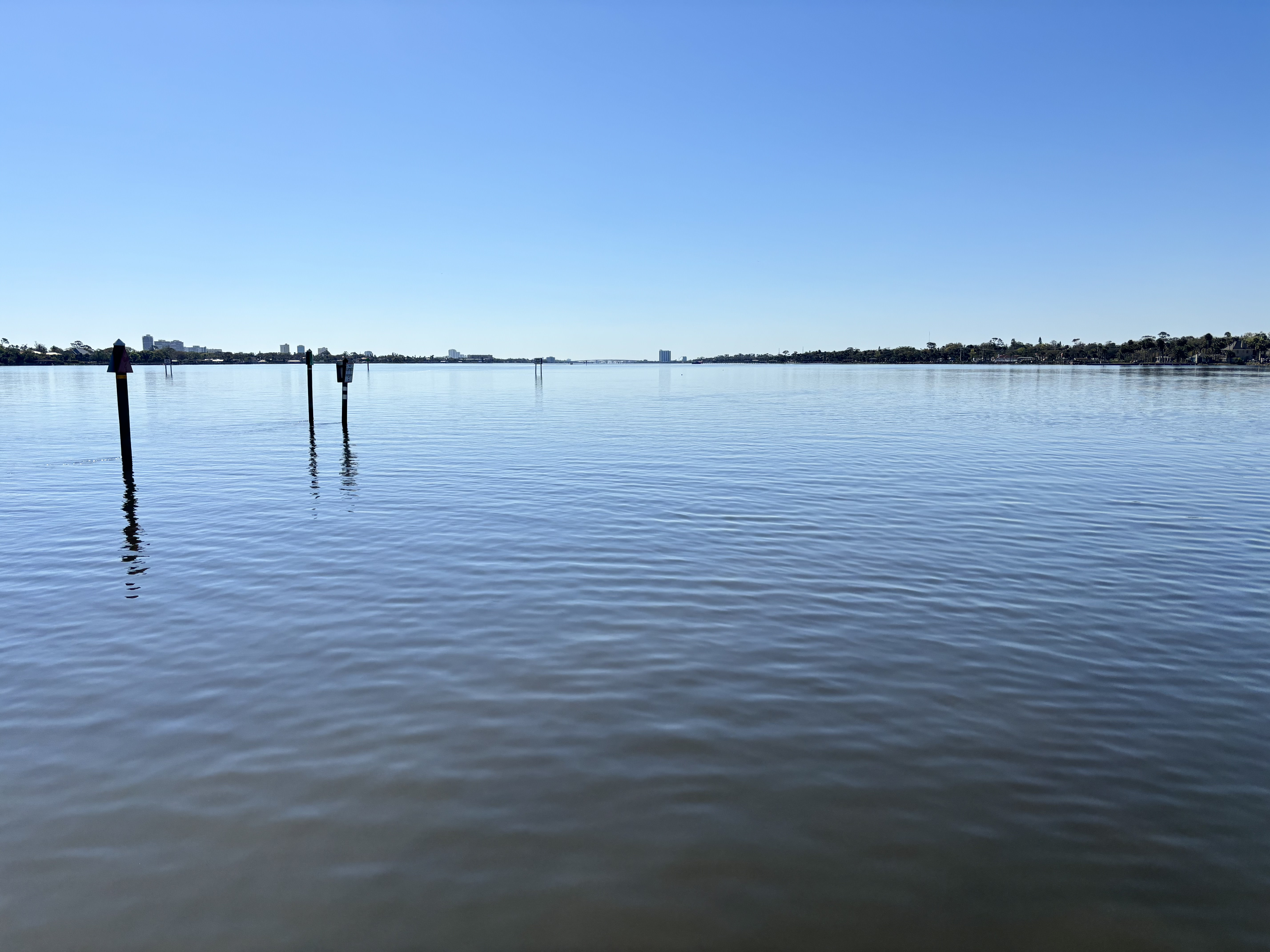
Halifax River looking south from under Granada Bridge

== See also ==
- List of crossings of the Halifax River
