= Port Orange Causeway =

Bridge in Florida, United States of America

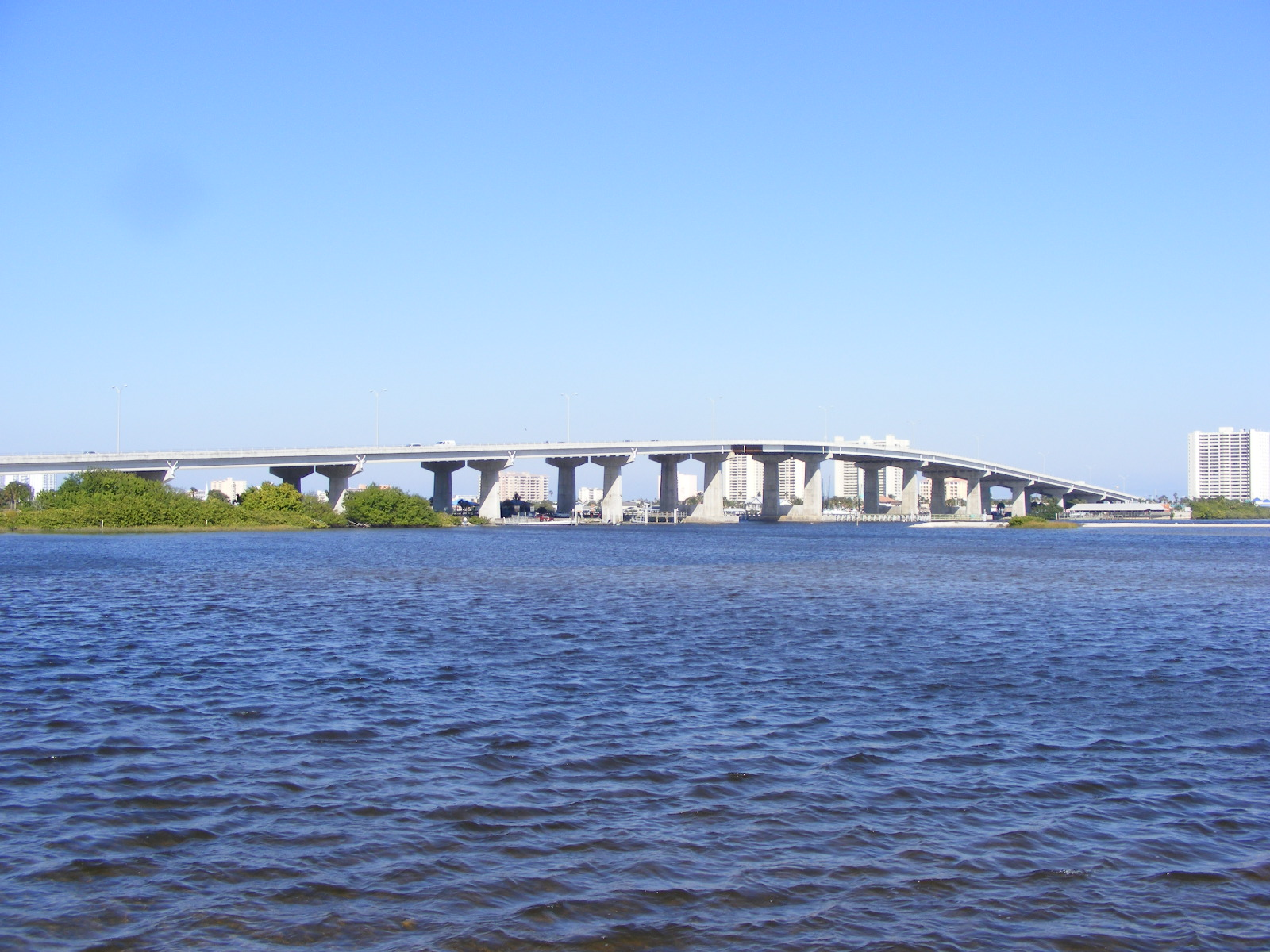
- Coordinates: 29°08′53″N 80°58′32″W
- Carries: Four lanes of SR A1A
- Crosses: Halifax River; Intracoastal Waterway
- Locale: Port Orange, Florida
- Official name: William V. Chappel Jr. Memorial Bridge
- Maintained by: Florida Dept. of Transportation
- ID number: 790147

Characteristics
- Design: Stringer/Multi-beam or Girder
- Material: Prestressed concrete
- Total length: 228.6 meters (750 ft)
- Clearance below: 19.8 meters (65 feet)

History
- Construction end: 1990

Statistics
- Daily traffic: 29,000
- Toll: Free

Location
- Interactive map of Port Orange Causeway

The Port Orange Causeway, commonly called the Port Orange Bridge or the Dunlawton Bridge, spans the Halifax River and Intracoastal Waterway in Port Orange, Volusia County, Florida. The bridge carries approximately 29,000 vehicles per day across four lanes of State Road A1A and Dunlawton Avenue.

== History ==
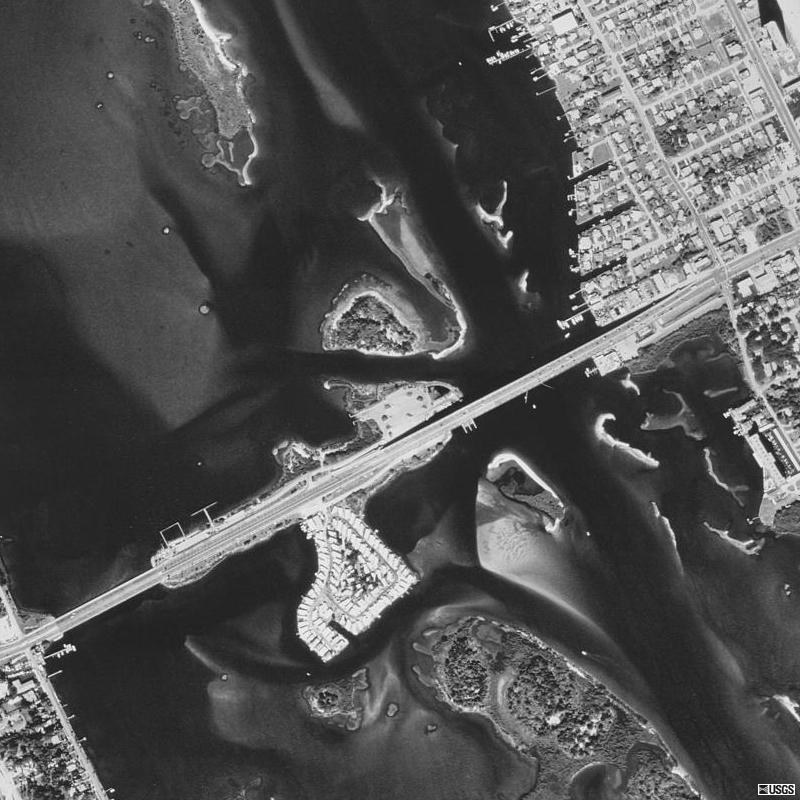
Aerial view of Port Orange Causeway

=== First bridge ===
The first bridge at this location was built by the Port Orange Bridge Company (owned by S. H. Gove) in 1906, made of sable palm pilings and pine bridge timbers. In 1918, Gove offered to sell the bridge to Volusia County. The bridge was severely damaged by a hurricane in 1932, and was torn down. Port Orange was without a bridge for many years after the disaster.

=== Second bridge ===
A bascule bridge was finally built here as a replacement in 1951. The two-lane drawbridge was paid for with tolls. The bridge connected the two ends of Dunlawton Avenue, from the mainland to the beach peninsula.

=== Third bridge ===
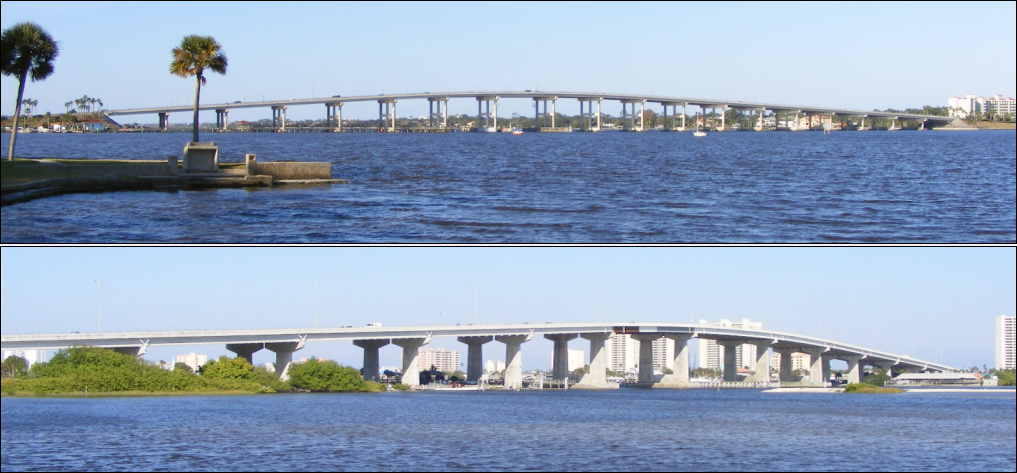
When funded in 1987, the 1990 built Port Orange Causeway bridge (bottom photo) over the Halifax River was planned to be similar to the 1983 Granada Bridge (top photo) passing over that same river.

In May 1987, the U.S. federal government agreed to provide $8.16 million of the estimated $12 million cost of building a Port Orange, Florida bridge planned to be similar to the Granada Bridge. After the drawbridge had aged and was expensive to maintain, it was replaced in 1990 by a new four-lane high bridge, which carries State Road A1A over the river. The Florida State Legislature designated the new bridge as the Congressman William V. Chappel Jr. Memorial Bridge.

== See also ==
- List of crossings of the Halifax River

== Gallery ==
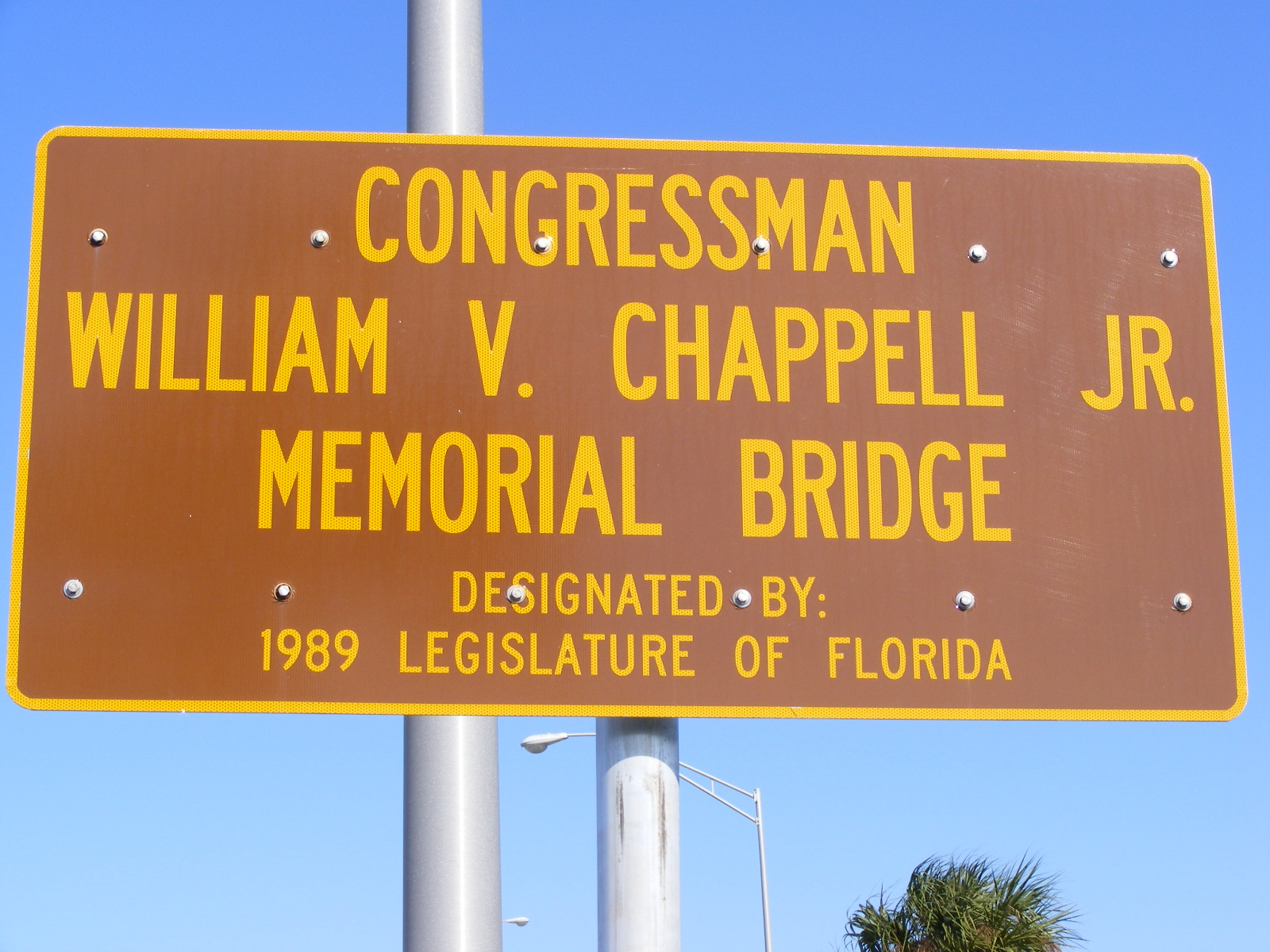

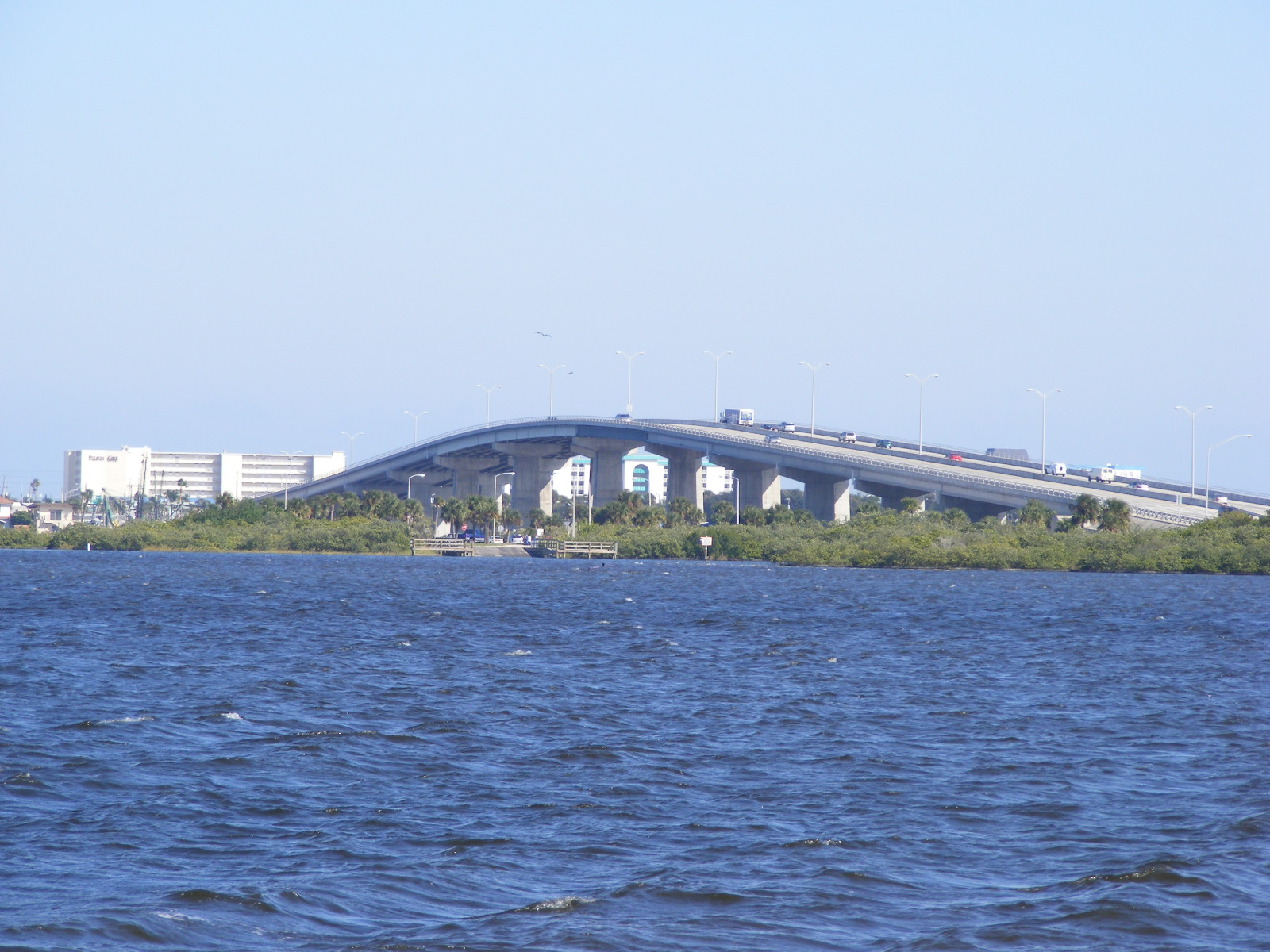

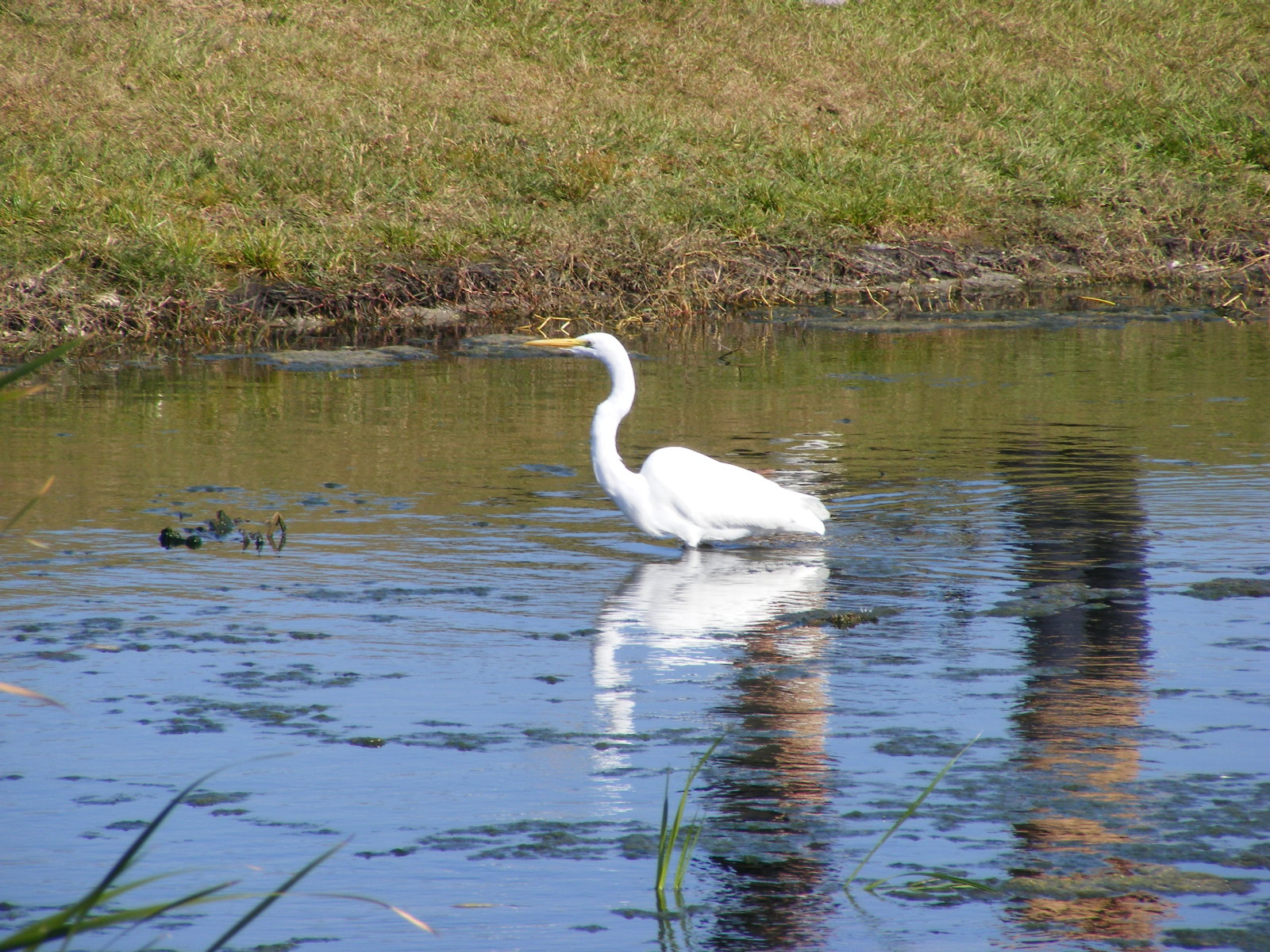

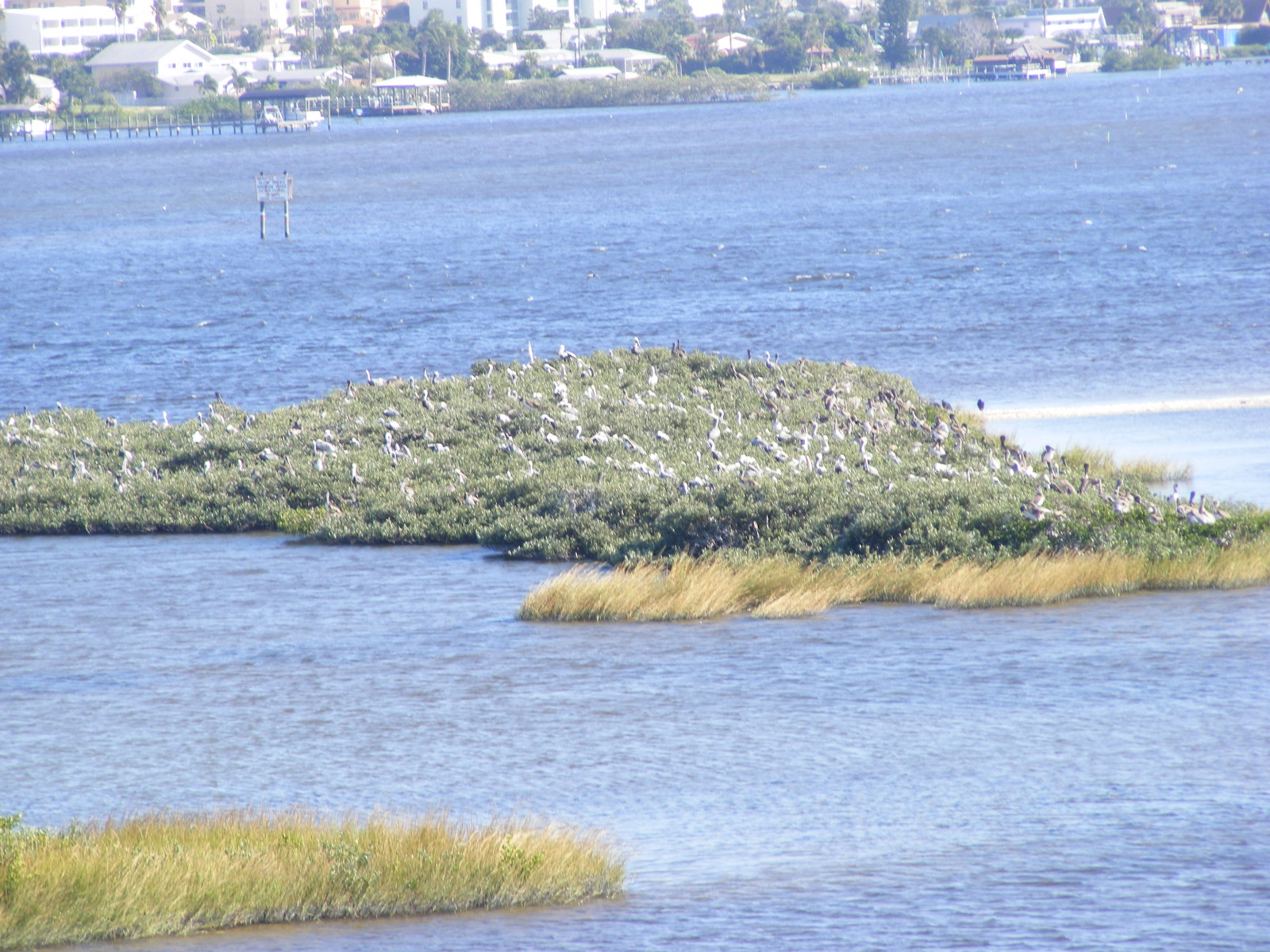
