= Bert Dosh Memorial Bridge =

Bridge in Florida, United States of America

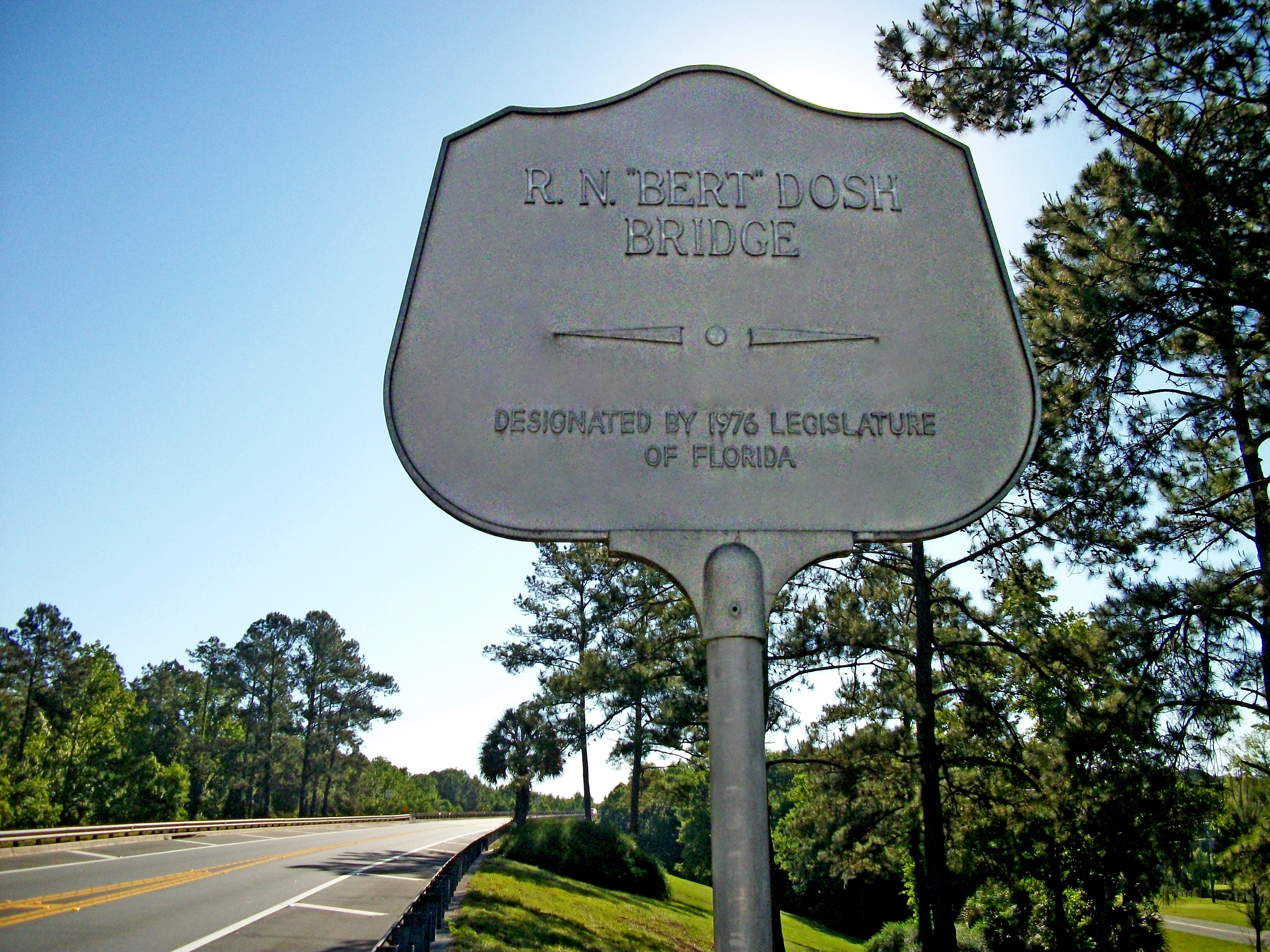
- Coordinates: 29.214°N 81.986°W
- Carries: 2 General purpose lanes of SR 40
- Crosses: Ocklawaha River
- Locale: Marion County, Florida
- Maintained by: Florida Department of Transportation
- ID number: 360055

Characteristics
- Total length: 2,732 feet

History
- Opened: 1972

Statistics
- Daily traffic: 14,300

Location
- Interactive map of Bert Dosh Memorial Bridge

The Bert Dosh Memorial Bridge, also known as the Delks Bluff Bridge, carries State Road 40 over the Ocklawaha River in north-central Florida, east of Silver Springs.

Originally planned as part of the Cross Florida Barge Canal project, the bridge was under construction at the time of the decision by President Richard Nixon to halt work on the canal project, and it was decided to complete the high-level bridge, which opened in 1972. The bridge was renamed in 1976 for R.N. "Bert" Dosh (1886-1970), an Ocala Evening Star newspaper editor who championed the construction of the canal.
