= Barberville Central High School =

- U.S. National Register of Historic Places
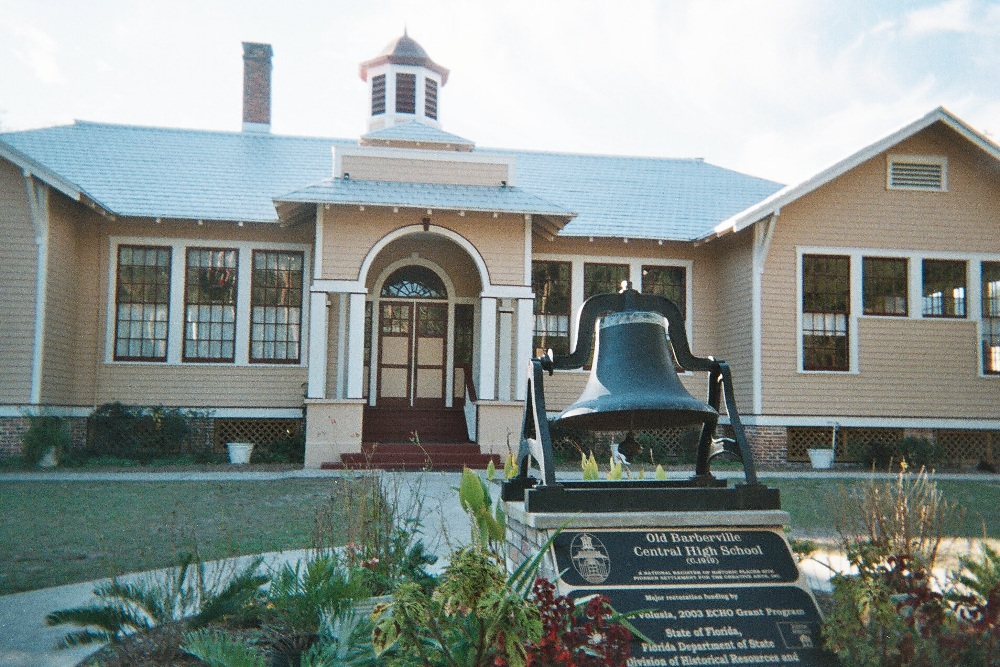

- Location within Volusia County
- Location: 1776 Lightfoot Lane, Barberville, Florida
- Coordinates: 29°11′0″N 81°25′23″W
- Built: 1920
- Architect: Francis Miller
- Architectural style: Frame Vernacular with Colonial Revival and Craftsman elements
- Website: pioneersettlement.org
- NRHP reference No.: 92001838
- Added to NRHP: February 3, 1993

The Barberville Central High School (also known as the Pioneer Settlement for Creative Arts) is a historic school building in Barberville, Florida, United States. On February 3, 1993, it was added to the U.S. National Register of Historic Places.

== Pioneer Settlement for Creative Arts ==
Barberville Pioneer Settlement / The Pioneer Settlement for Creative Arts is an open air village located on the grounds of the Barberville Central High School. Since 1982 the museum has moved many historic structures to the grounds, including:

- Pierson Railroad Depot (c. 1885)
- Astor Bridgekeeper's House (c. 1926)
- Turpentine Comm./Store (c. early 1900s)
- Turpentine Still (c. 1924)
- Pottery Shed (c. 1920s)
- Lewis Log Cabin (c. 1875)
- Midway United Methodist Church (c. 1890)
- Huntington Post Office (c. 1885)
- Quarters House (c. 1920s)
- Pastime touring boat (c. 1910)
- The Joseph Underhill House (c.1879) The oldest known brick residence in Volusia County. Currently undergoing stabilization/restoration.

Other structures have been built on site to demonstrate historical trades including a print shop, wheelwright shop and carriage house, a woodwright shop, and a blacksmith shop.
