= Rainbow Lakes Estates, Florida =

Rainbow Lakes Estates
- Census-designated place
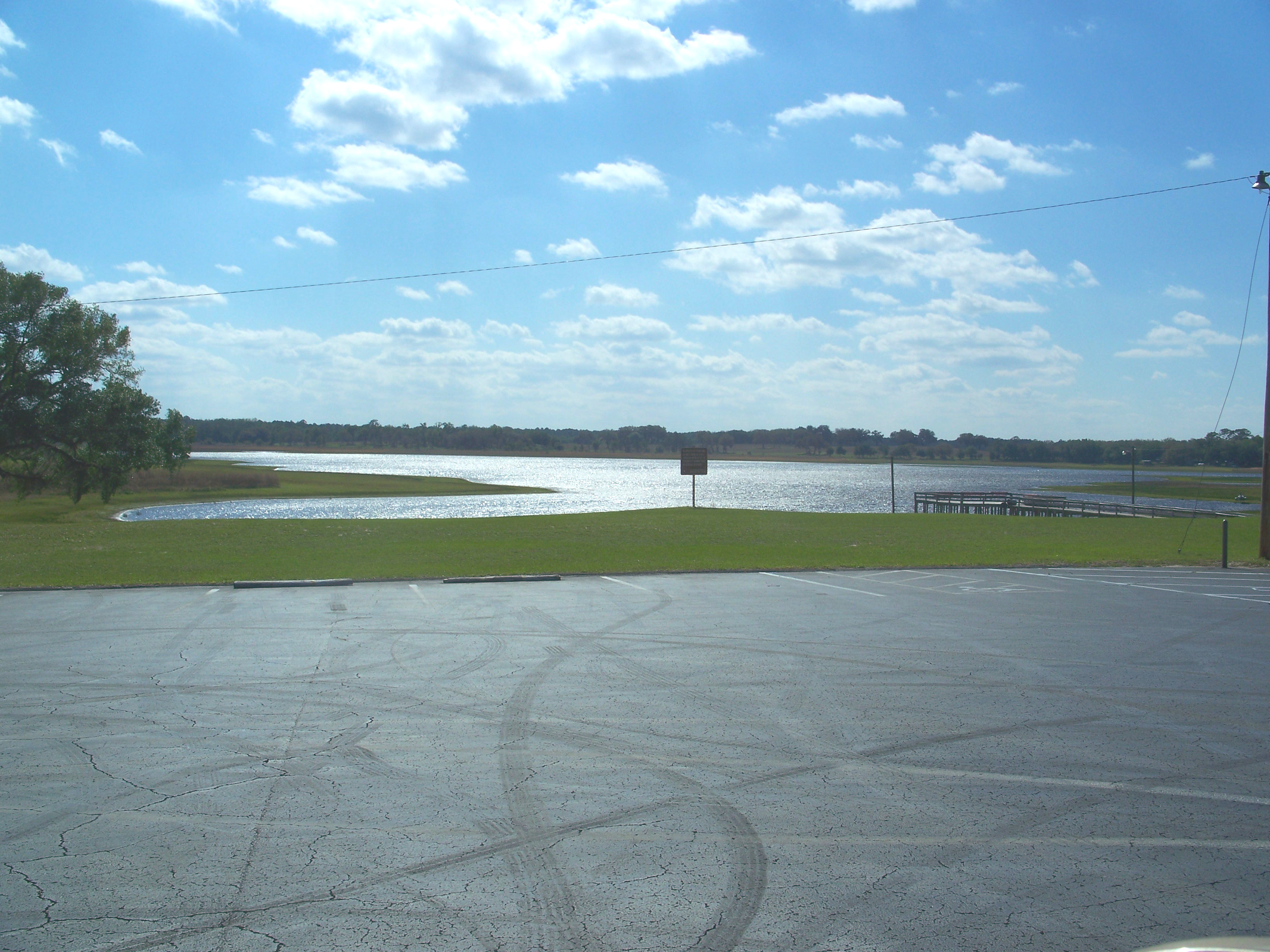
- Lake Bonable, in Rainbow Lakes Estates

- Location within Florida Location within the United States
- Coordinates: 29°09′15″N 82°29′36″W
- Country: United States
- State: Florida
- County: Marion

Area
  - Total: 16.37 sq mi (42.4 km^{2})
  - Land: 15.83 sq mi (41.0 km^{2})
  - Water: 0.54 sq mi (1.4 km^{2})
- Elevation: 108 ft (33 m)

Population (2020)
  - Total: 3,438
  - Density: 217.1/sq mi (83.8/km^{2})
- Time zone: UTC-5 (Eastern (EST))
  - Summer (DST): UTC-4 (EDT)
- ZIP Code: 34431 (Dunnellon)
- Area code: 352
- FIPS code: 12-59450
- GNIS feature ID: 2805189

Rainbow Lakes Estates is an unincorporated community and census-designated place (CDP) in Marion and Levy counties, Florida, United States, established as a Municipal Services District. The Marion County part of the community is part of the Ocala, Florida Metropolitan Statistical Area, while the Levy County portion is part of the Gainesville, Florida Metropolitan Statistical Area. It was first listed as a CDP for the 2020 census, at which time it had a population of 3,438.

The community is northwest of Rainbow Springs, a natural spring in nearby Rainbow Springs State Park. There are various community owned and maintained facilities as well as paved roads. A large percentage of the platted building lots are unimproved.

== Geography ==
Rainbow Lakes Estates is located in western Marion County and southeastern Levy County. US 41 forms the easternmost edge of the community, 6 miles (10 km) north of Dunnellon. Ocala, the Marion county seat, is 22 miles (35 km) to the east, and Williston is 17 miles (27 km) to the north.

== Demographics ==
Rainbow Lakes Estates first appeared as a census designated place in the 2020 U.S. census.

=== 2020 census ===
As of the 2020 census, Rainbow Lakes Estates had a population of 3,438. It was first listed as a CDP for that census. The median age was 53.4 years. 16.5% of residents were under the age of 18 and 28.9% of residents were 65 years of age or older. For every 100 females there were 100.2 males, and for every 100 females age 18 and over there were 98.7 males age 18 and over.

0.0% of residents lived in urban areas, while 100.0% lived in rural areas.

There were 1,434 households in Rainbow Lakes Estates, of which 21.2% had children under the age of 18 living in them. Of all households, 50.2% were married-couple households, 19.7% were households with a male householder and no spouse or partner present, and 23.7% were households with a female householder and no spouse or partner present. About 27.9% of all households were made up of individuals and 16.6% had someone living alone who was 65 years of age or older.

There were 1,614 housing units, of which 11.2% were vacant. The homeowner vacancy rate was 2.5% and the rental vacancy rate was 11.3%.

Racial composition as of the 2020 census
Race	Number	Percent
White	2,841	82.6%
Black or African American	103	3.0%
American Indian and Alaska Native	11	0.3%
Asian	27	0.8%
Native Hawaiian and Other Pacific Islander	0	0.0%
Some other race	120	3.5%
Two or more races	336	9.8%
Hispanic or Latino (of any race)	453	13.2%
