= Florida Department of Agriculture and Consumer Services =

Government agency

- FDACS Department Seal

- FDACS Department Logo

Department overview
- Formed: 1870
- Preceding agencies: Florida Commissioner of Immigration; Florida Commissioner of Lands and Immigration
- Jurisdiction: Government of Florida
- Headquarters: The Capitol Tallahassee, Florida
- Department executive: Wilton Simpson, Commissioner of Agriculture
- Child agencies: Division of Administration Division of AES; Division of Animal Industry Division of Aquaculture; Division of Consumer Services Division of Dairy Industry Div. of Food Safety; Florida Forest Service; Division of Licensing Division of Marketing and Development; Division of Plant Industry Division of Standards
- Website: fdacs.gov

The Florida Department of Agriculture and Consumer Services (FDACS) is an executive department of the government of Florida.

The Commissioner of Agriculture (directly elected by voters statewide for a four-year term, and a member of the Florida Cabinet) is the head of the department. The current commissioner is Wilton Simpson.

== History ==
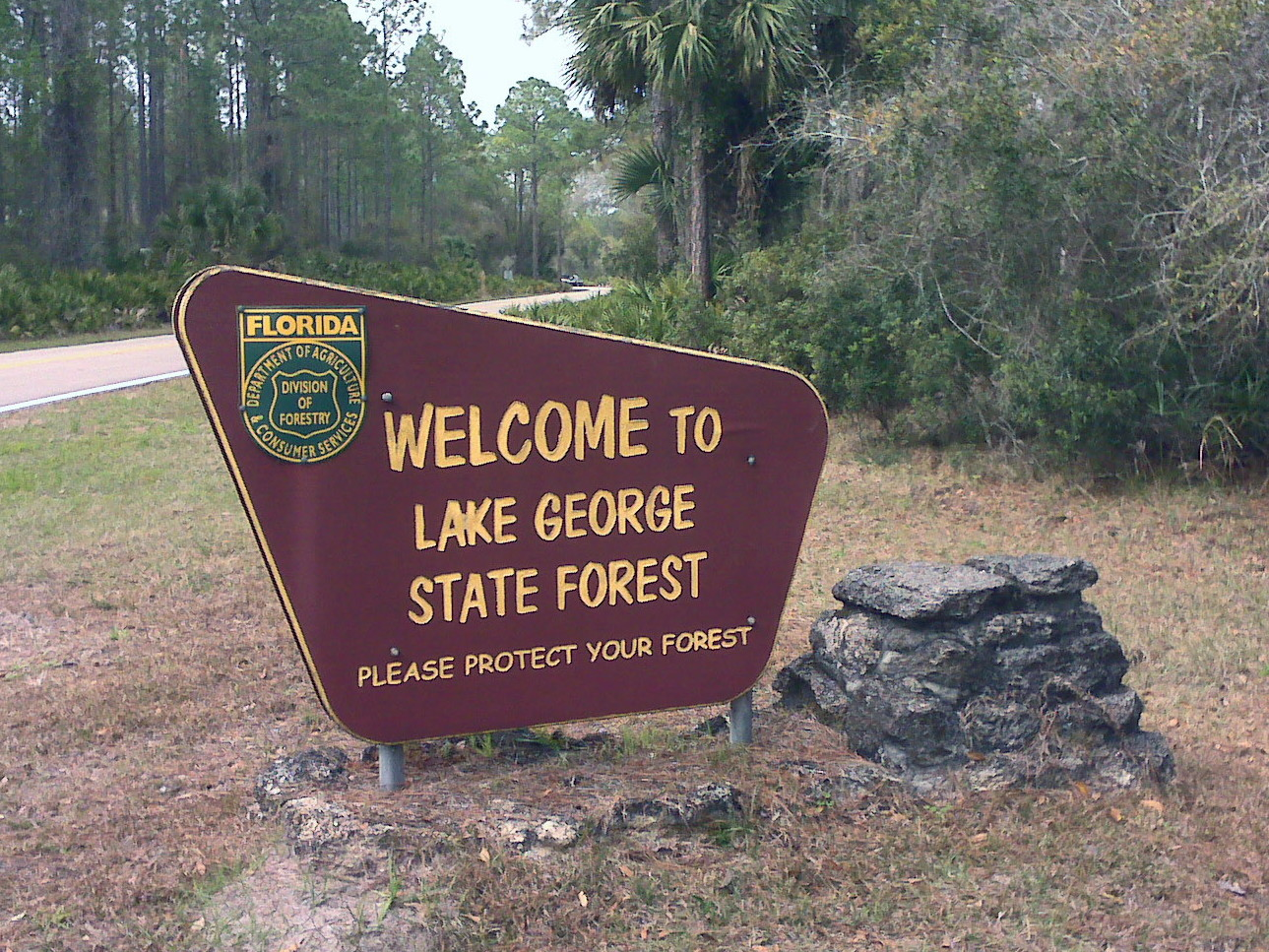
FDACS Florida Forest Service manages Florida's 35 State Forests, including Lake George State Forest in Volusia County.

The Florida Constitution of 1868 provided for the creation of the Office of Commissioner of Immigration, whose duties consisted of attracting settlers to engage in agriculture. The Florida Constitution was amended in 1871 to consolidate the offices of Surveyor General and Commissioner of Immigration as the new Commissioner of Lands and Immigration. In 1885, the Constitution was revised and the Commissioner of Lands and Immigration post was renamed Commissioner of Agriculture. The duties of the Commissioner of Agriculture were revised to include supervision of the state prisons. (A Division of Corrections was created in 1957 and state prisons were removed from the list of Commissioner of Agriculture responsibilities).

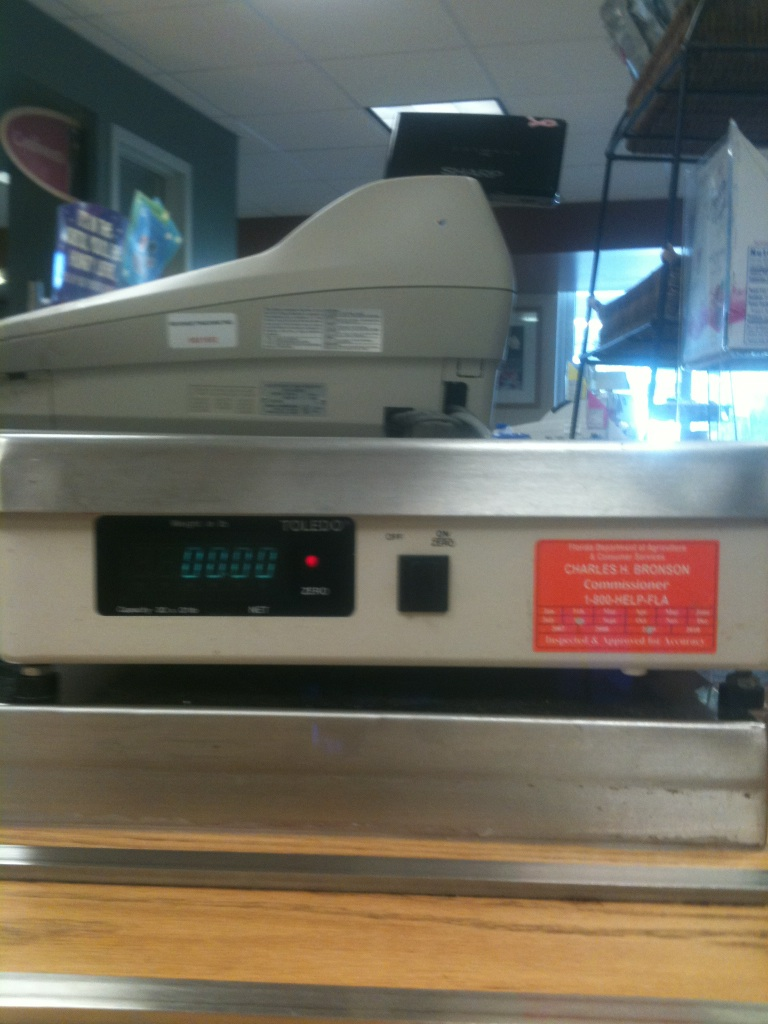
Florida scales used in trade, as this hospital cafeteria checkout scale in Port Charlotte, are inspected for accuracy by the Division of Standards' Bureau of Weights and Measures.

The Agricultural Services Reorganization Act (ASRA) was passed in 1959 and became effective January 15, 1961. This state law abolished some independent boards and bureaus, which were assigned to the Department of Agriculture's divisions. These included: Administration, Animal Industry, Dairy Industry, Fruit and Vegetable Inspection, Marketing, Plant Industry, Inspection and Standards. The State Chemist, a position that existed since 1891, was moved to the new Division of Chemistry.

The Legislature created the Office of Consumer Services in 1967. The Executive Reorganization Act of 1969 renamed the Office of Consumer Services the Division of Consumer Services and the Board of Forestry the Division of Forestry. The Department of Agriculture was renamed the Department of Agriculture and Consumer Services (FDACS).

The 1992 Legislature passed Chapter 92-291 of the Laws of Florida, which formally organized the Department of Agriculture and Consumer Services into the following divisions: Administration, Agricultural Environmental Services (AES), Animal Industry, Plant Industry, Marketing and Development, Dairy Industry, Food Safety, Fruit and Vegetables, Consumer Services, Forestry, Standards, Aquaculture, and Licensing.

In addition to the above divisions, the FDACS includes separate offices for Agricultural Law Enforcement, Agricultural Water Policy, Agricultural Emergency Preparedness, the Inspector General, as well as for the Commissioner of Agriculture.

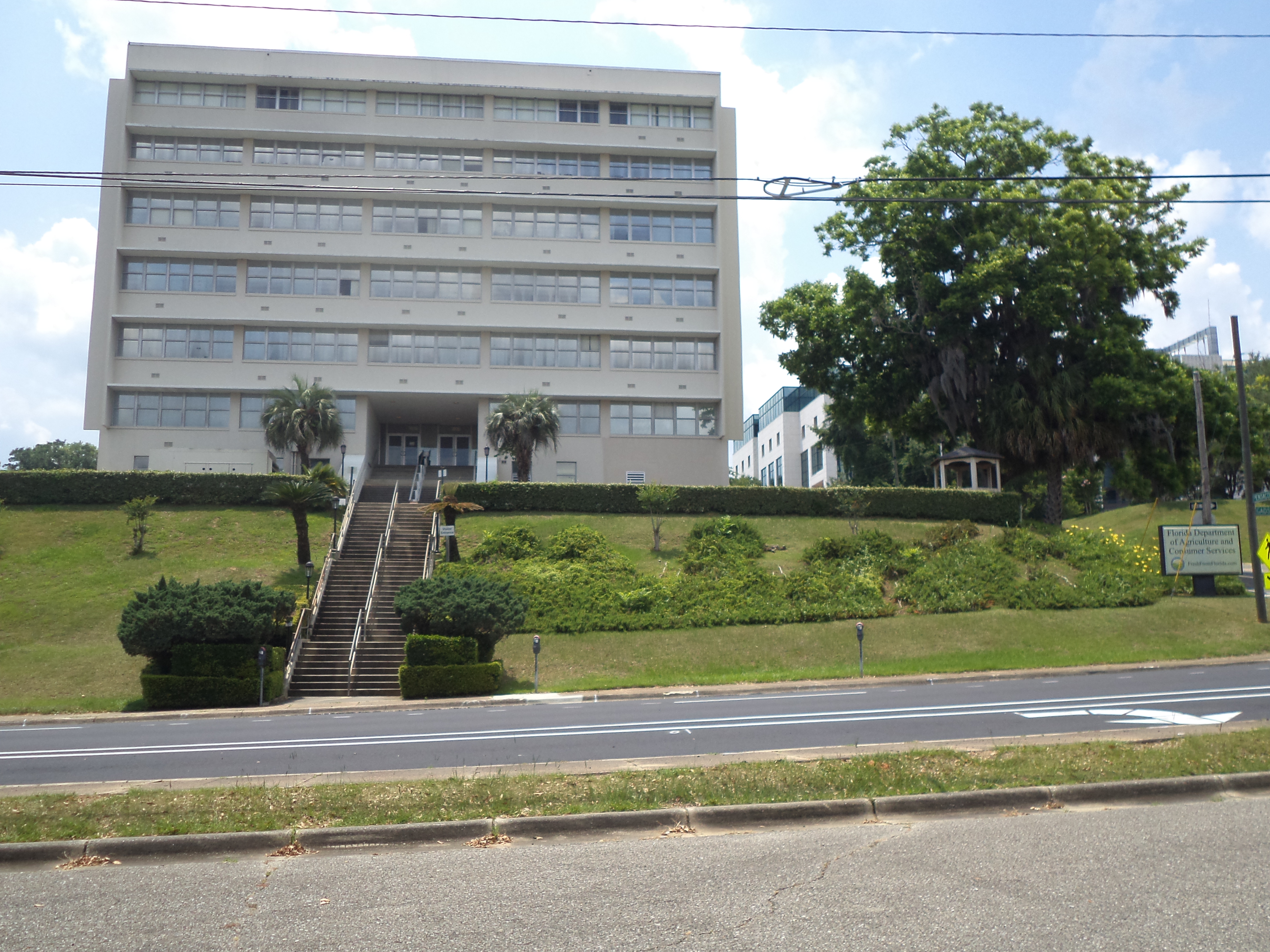
The Florida Department of Agriculture and Consumer Services building in Tallahassee.

== Organization ==
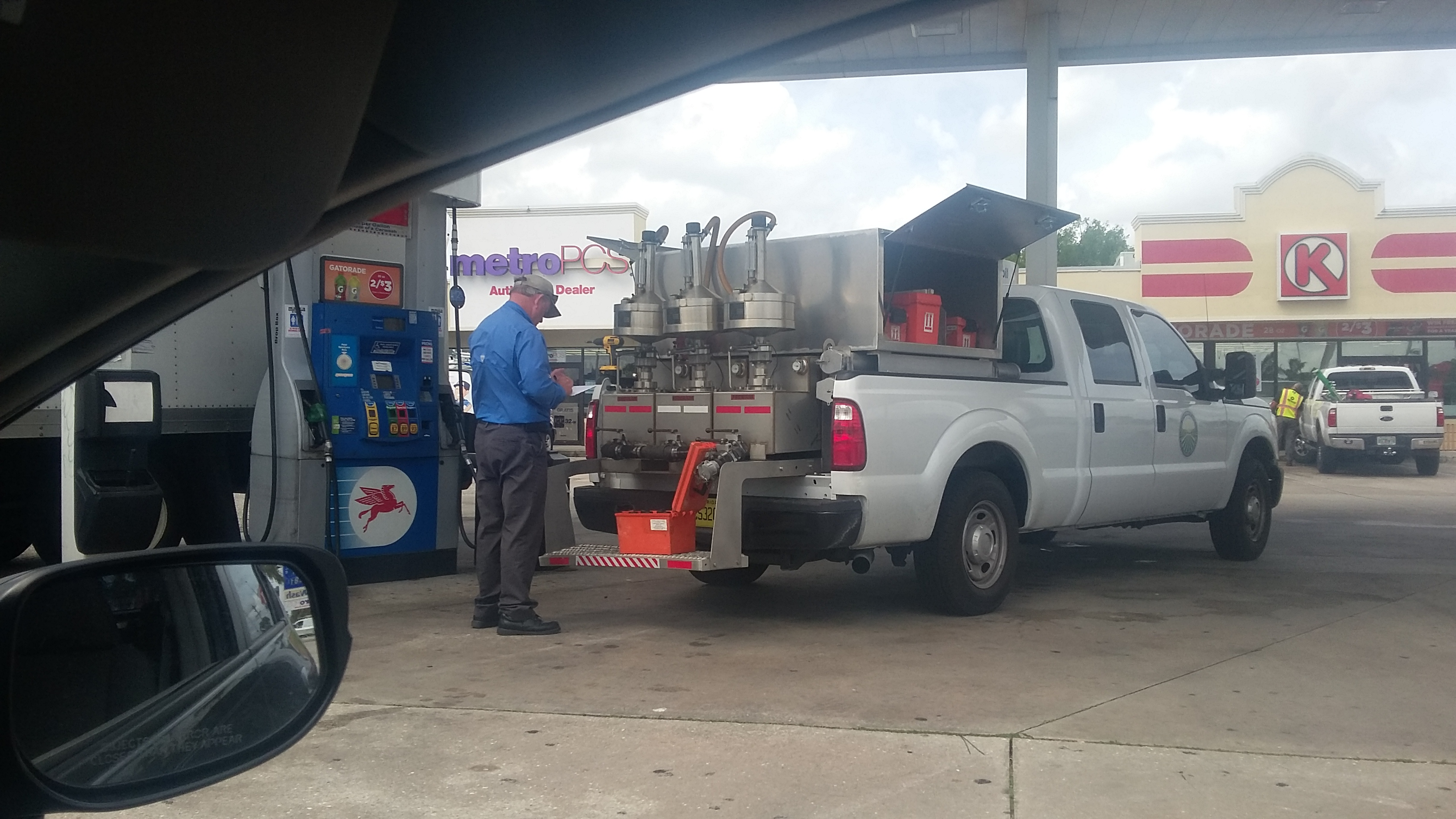
A petroleum inspector visiting a Mobil station in Port Charlotte

The Department of Agriculture and Consumer Services is headed by the commissioner, who is elected statewide to a four-year term. The commissioner is assisted in managing the department by a chief of staff, three deputy commissioners and one assistant deputy commissioner. The department is organized into twelve programmatic Divisions and one support division, each headed by a division director. Each division is subdivided into bureaus, with each headed by a bureau chief. The bureaus are further subdivided into sections.

== Discrimination policy ==
In January 2019, the Florida Department of Agriculture and Consumer Services (in the past was called the Florida Agricultural Commission) explicitly added sexual orientation and gender identity to their discrimination workplace policy.
