= Barberville, Florida =

Unincorporated community in Volusia County, Florida

Barberville
- Unincorporated community
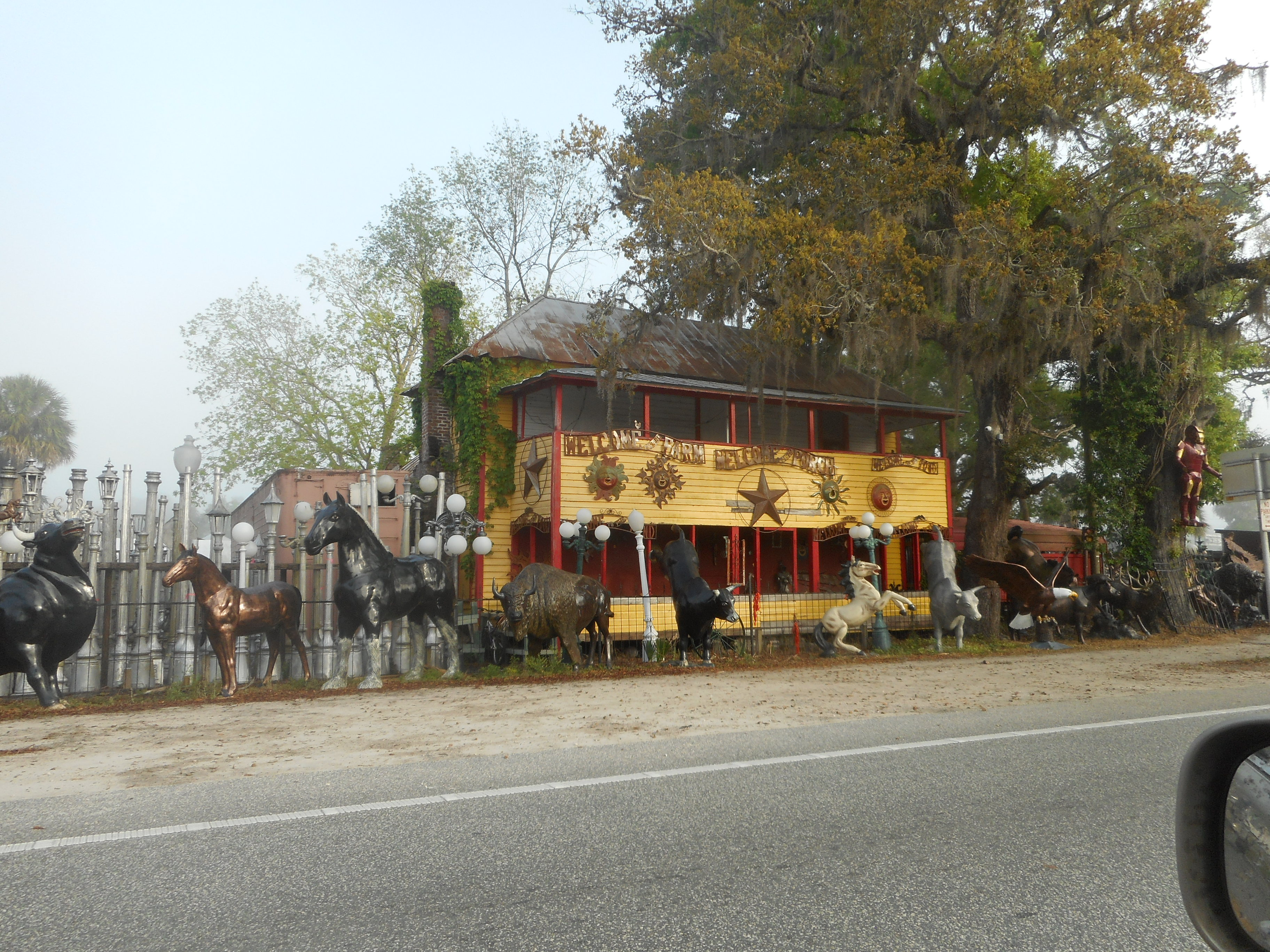
- The Barberville Yard Art Emporium, located on SR 40 west of US 17.

- Location in Volusia County and the state of Florida
- Coordinates: 29°11′13″N 81°25′16″W
- Country: United States
- State: Florida
- County: Volusia
- Time zone: UTC-5 (EST)
  - Summer (DST): UTC-4 (EDT)
- ZIP code: 32105
- Area code: 386

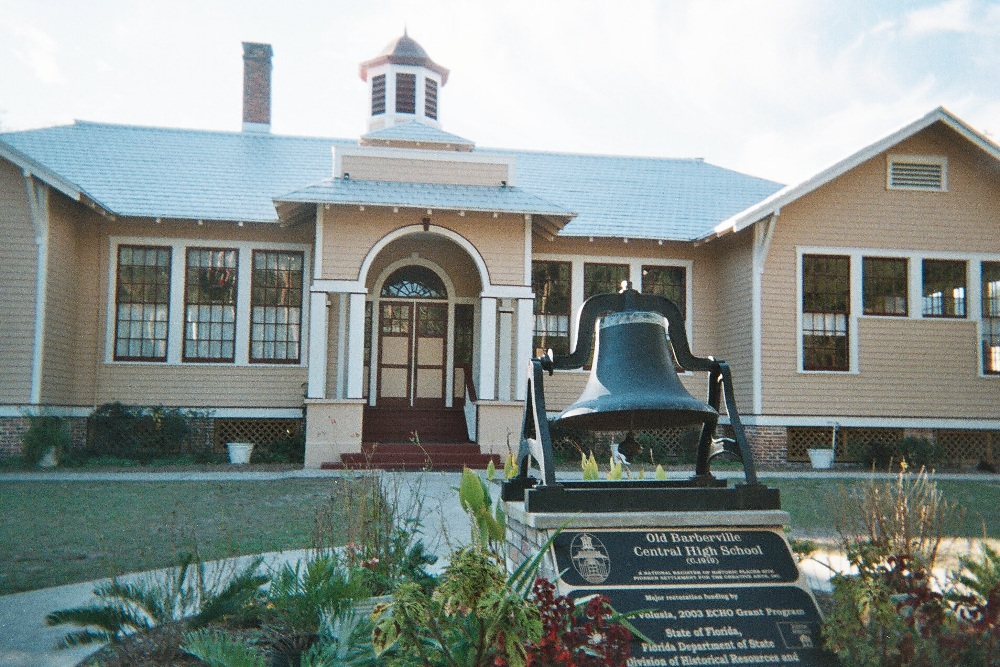
Historic Barberville Central High School, located on CR 3.

Barberville is an unincorporated community in Volusia County, Florida, United States, located at the intersection of State Road 40 and U.S. 17.

Barberville is the home of the former Barberville Central High School, which is on the grounds of the Pioneer Settlement for Creative Arts.
