= Astor, Florida =

- Census-designated place
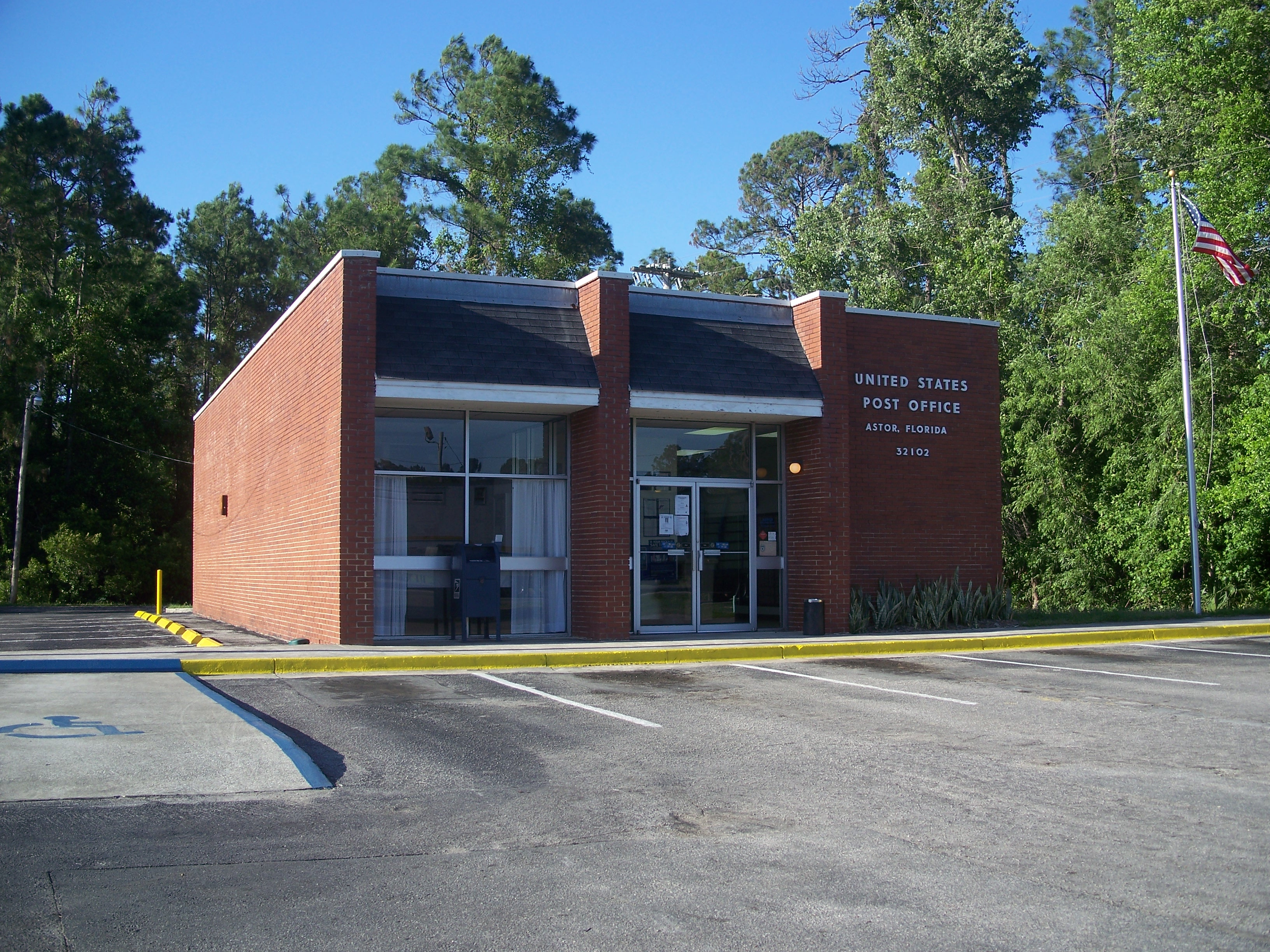
- Astor post office

- Location in Lake County, Florida
- Coordinates: 29°09′48″N 81°32′06″W
- Country: United States
- State: Florida
- County: Lake

Area
  - Total: 2.65 sq mi (6.87 km^{2})
  - Land: 2.34 sq mi (6.05 km^{2})
  - Water: 0.32 sq mi (0.82 km^{2})
- Elevation: 13 ft (4.0 m)

Population (2020)
  - Total: 1,759
  - Density: 753.4/sq mi (290.89/km^{2})
- Time zone: UTC-5 (Eastern (EST))
  - Summer (DST): UTC-4 (EDT)
- ZIP code: 32102
- Area code: 352 386
- FIPS code: 12-02275
- GNIS feature ID: 2402654

Astor is an unincorporated community and census-designated place (CDP) in Lake County, Florida, United States, located on the west side of the St. Johns River between Lake George and Lake Dexter. The community straddles State Road 40, with the community of Volusia in Volusia County across the St. Johns to the east and Astor Park to the west. As of the 2020 census, Astor had a population of 1,759. It is part of the Orlando–Kissimmee–Sanford Metropolitan Statistical Area.

== Geography ==
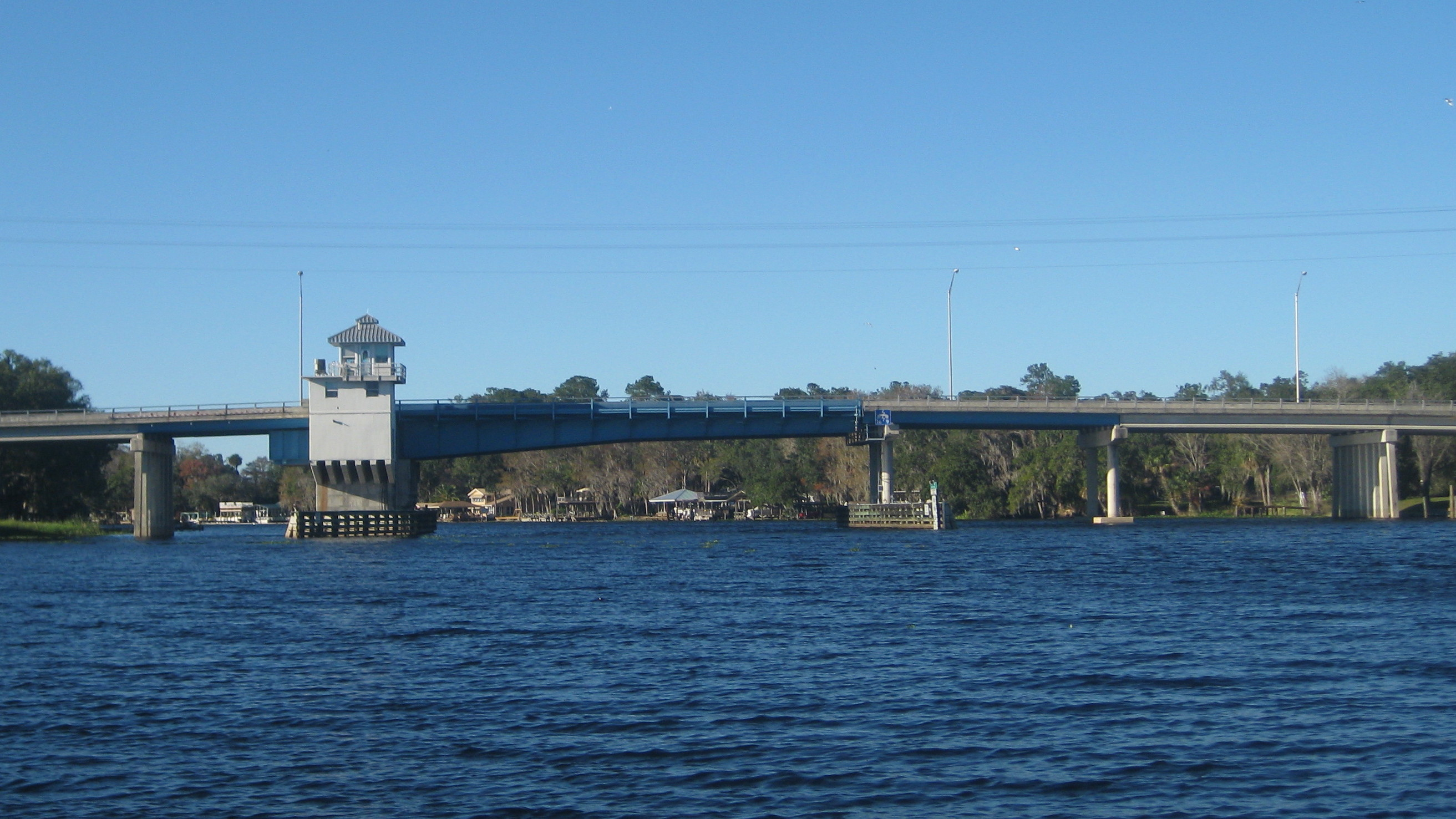
The Astor Bridge over the St. Johns River between Astor and Volusia

Astor is located in northern Lake County. Via State Road 40, it is 31 miles (50 km) west of Ormond Beach and 39 miles (63 km) east of Ocala. Tavares, the county seat of Lake County, is 32 miles (51 km) to the southwest via SR 40 and SR 19.

According to the United States Census Bureau, the Astor CDP has a total area of 2.7 square miles (6.9 km^{2}), of which 2.3 square miles (6.0 km^{2}) are land and 0.3 square miles (0.8 km^{2}), or 11.93%, are water. Astor's water area includes the west half of the St. John's River and a network of canals, extending over 4 miles (6 km) in total length, providing river access for many of its residents. Astor lies entirely within the boundaries of the Ocala National Forest.

== History ==
The Astor area and much of the land along the St. Johns River was inhabited by Timucua natives prior to settlement by Europeans. Early attempts at settlement included an English trading post in 1763, and in 1822 a plantation growing sugar cane and oranges was established by Jewish immigrant Moses Elias Levy. By 1838 the Seminole Wars had begun and the United States government established Fort Butler to defend the river as the primary route of transportation inside Florida. These earliest efforts at settlement all met with failure due to war or disease, and until the 1870s the area was largely deserted.

In 1874, William Backhouse Astor Jr. from New York City's wealthy Astor family purchased over 12,000 acres (49 km^{2}) of land, upon which he began to establish a town he called "Manhattan". New settlers arrived by steamboat to the town which Astor had endowed with a church, schoolhouse, botanical garden, and free cemetery. William Astor also built a hotel, saw mill, and eventually a railroad, the St. Johns and Lake Eustis Railway, which headed southwest towards the communities of Eustis and Leesburg. A few miles to the west of town, a satellite community called Astor Park grew up along the shore of Lake Schimmerhorn (named for Astor's wife, Caroline Schermerhorn Astor). Over the next twenty years Astor saw his town grow, but the Manhattan name never caught on. When William Astor died in 1892, the town was officially renamed "Astor" in his honor.

John Jacob Astor IV inherited his father William's estate and continued to promote the town and their business interests in Florida. Following his demise in the sinking of the RMS Titanic in 1912, the estate passed to his son, Vincent. William Vincent Astor was not interested in his grandfather's Florida enterprises, and so the Astor family's interests in the area were sold. This, combined with a severe decline in steamboat travel on the St. Johns due to increased availability of rail travel, signaled the end of the town's prosperity and prominence. The first Astor Bridge was built in 1926; by 1928, Astor's hotel had burned down and the railroad was abandoned, leaving Astor without telephone or telegraph service for the next few decades.

Today the community of Astor is largely reliant upon tourism, and is a popular spot for winter visitors from the north and for fishing, hunting, and boating enthusiasts.

== Demographics ==
Historical population
Census	Pop.	Note	%±
2020	1,759		—
U.S. Decennial Census

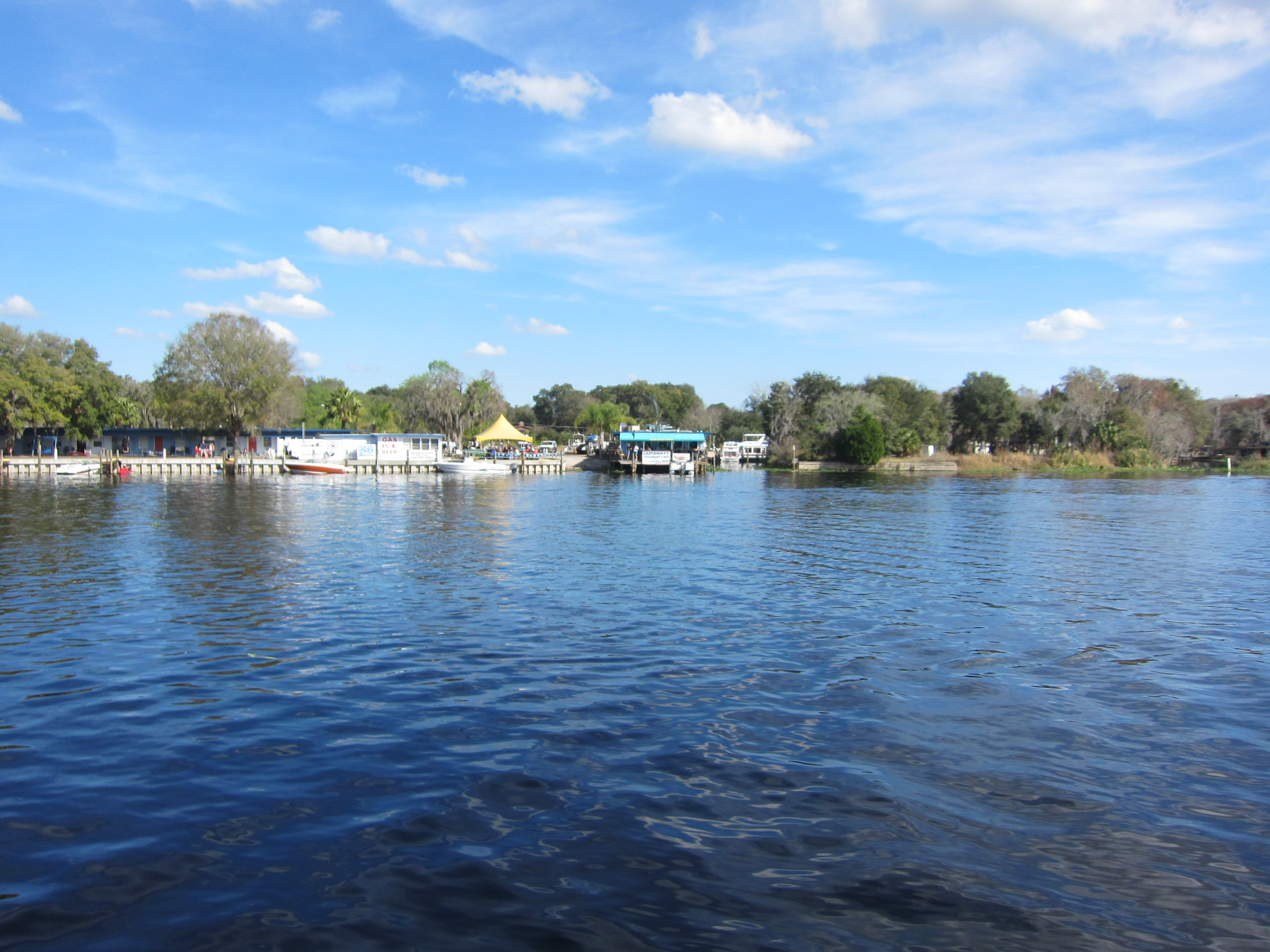
St. Johns River at Astor. Across the river is the Astor Marina.

=== 2020 census ===
As of the 2020 census, Astor had a population of 1,759. The median age was 55.1 years. 14.8% of residents were under the age of 18 and 29.3% of residents were 65 years of age or older. For every 100 females there were 108.7 males, and for every 100 females age 18 and over there were 110.2 males age 18 and over.

0.0% of residents lived in urban areas, while 100.0% lived in rural areas.

There were 784 households in Astor, of which 16.2% had children under the age of 18 living in them. Of all households, 45.8% were married-couple households, 23.1% were households with a male householder and no spouse or partner present, and 20.7% were households with a female householder and no spouse or partner present. About 31.1% of all households were made up of individuals and 18.2% had someone living alone who was 65 years of age or older.

There were 1,145 housing units, of which 31.5% were vacant. The homeowner vacancy rate was 3.1% and the rental vacancy rate was 6.1%.

Racial composition as of the 2020 census
Race	Number	Percent
White	1,463	83.2%
Black or African American	8	0.5%
American Indian and Alaska Native	7	0.4%
Asian	2	0.1%
Native Hawaiian and Other Pacific Islander	1	0.1%
Some other race	176	10.0%
Two or more races	102	5.8%
Hispanic or Latino (of any race)	265	15.1%

=== 2000 census ===
As of the 2000 census, there were 1,487 people, 641 households, and 444 families residing in the CDP. The population density was 603.3 inhabitants per square mile (232.9/km^{2}). There were 1,027 housing units at an average density of 416.6 per square mile (160.9/km^{2}). The racial makeup of the CDP was 96.97% White, 0.67% African American, 0.81% Native American, 0.07% Pacific Islander, 1.21% from other races, and 0.27% from two or more races. Hispanic or Latino of any race were 9.15% of the population.

There were 641 households, out of which 20.3% had children under the age of 18 living with them, 55.2% were married couples living together, 7.6% had a female householder with no husband present, and 30.7% were non-families. 24.3% of all households were made up of individuals, and 12.6% had someone living alone who was 65 years of age or older. The average household size was 2.32 and the average family size was 2.68.

In the CDP, the population was spread out, with 19.9% under the age of 18, 5.2% from 18 to 24, 20.4% from 25 to 44, 30.6% from 45 to 64, and 23.8% who were 65 years of age or older. The median age was 48 years. For every 100 females, there were 97.0 males. For every 100 females age 18 and over, there were 93.7 males.

The median income for a household in the CDP was $31,284, and the median income for a family was $31,786. Males had a median income of $22,074 versus $20,949 for females. The per capita income for the CDP was $14,467. About 9.2% of families and 12.5% of the population were below the poverty line, including 15.3% of those under age 18 and 6.7% of those age 65 or over.

== Notable people ==
- Moses Elias Levy
- Robert M. McTureous Jr.
