= LCLS =

LCLS may refer to:

== Library systems ==
- Lake County Library System, in Lake County, Florida, US
- Luzerne County Library System, in Luzerne County, Pennsylvania, US

== Other uses ==
- Linac Coherent Light Source, at the SLAC National Accelerator Laboratory in Menlo Park, California, US

== See also ==
- Library System of Lancaster County (LSLC), in Lancaster, Pennsylvania, US
