= Alfred St. Clair-Abrams =

American politician

Member of the Florida House of Representatives

Personal details
- Born: September 1865 Georgia
- Died: May 1915 (aged 49) Tavares, Florida
- Children: Alfred St. Clair-Abrams II

Alfred St. Clair-Abrams (September 1865 – May 1915) was an attorney, newspaper editor and politician who served as a member of the Florida legislature and as the State Attorney for Lake County, Florida.

== Early life ==
St. Clair-Abrams was born September 1865, in Georgia to Alexander St. Clair-Abrams and his wife Joanna.

== Business career ==
In addition to being a lawyer, St. Clair-Abrams was also the editor of the Tavares Herald

== 1896 Florida legislature election and killing of W. Bailey Tucker ==
In 1896 St. Clair-Abrams was running for the Florida legislature as an anti railroad candidate. St. Clair-Abrams was defeated in his election, and he believed that W. Bailey Tucker of the Florida Central and Peninsula Railroad had brought about his defeat by unfair means.

On July 26, 1896 St. Clair-Abrams went to Tucker's home, confronted him and shot him in the head with a shotgun loaded with buckshot. Initially it was believed that St. Clair-Abrams shot Tucker because of St. Clair-Abrams' anger over the election, however it was later revealed that St. Clair-Abrams shot Tucker because Tucker was having an affair with St. Clair-Abrams' wife.

== Death and burial ==
After a long illness, St. Clair-Abrams died at his home in Tavares, Florida in May 1915. He was buried in Jacksonville, Florida.
