= Union Congregational Church (Tavares, Florida) =

Church in Tavares, FL

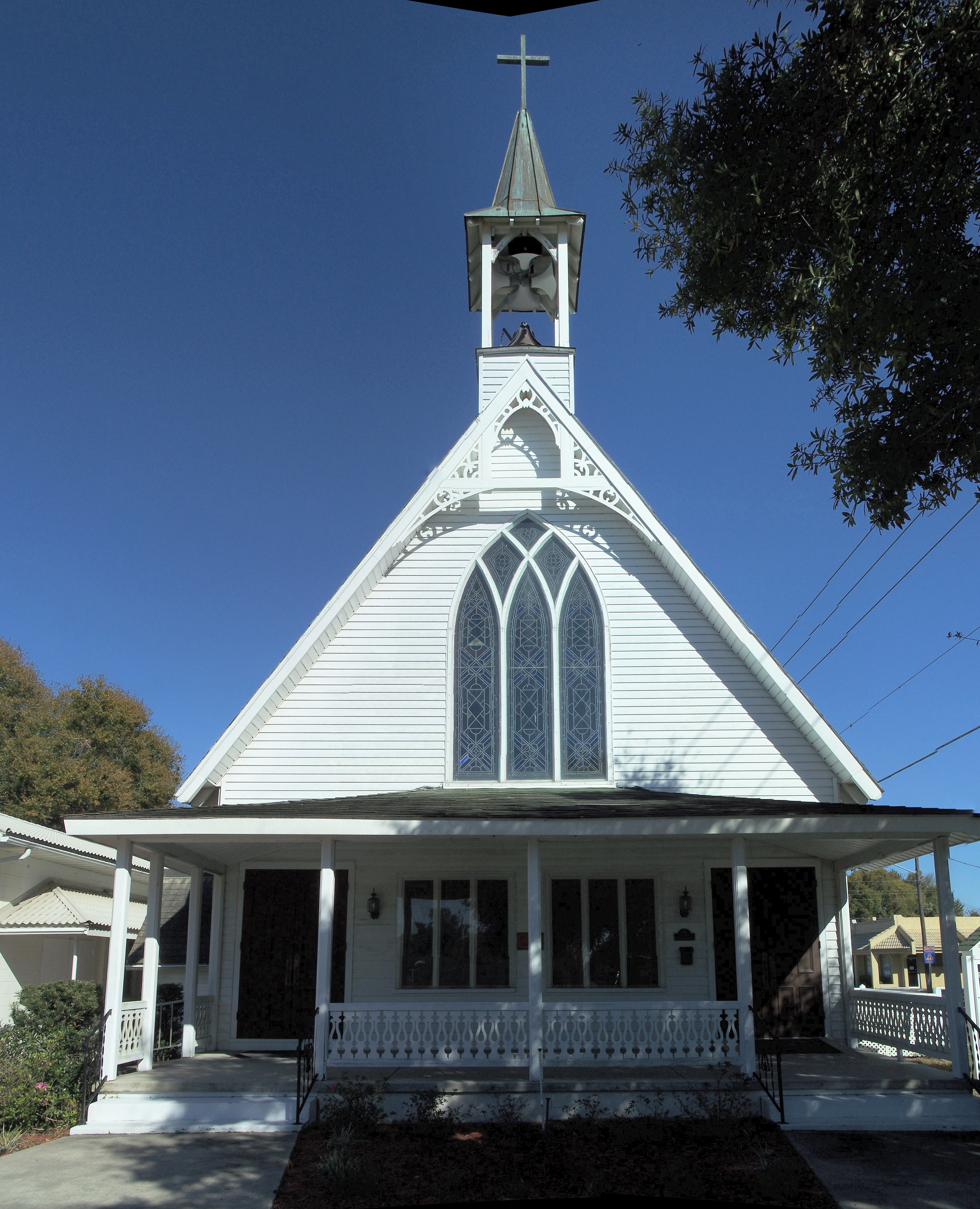
- Interactive map of the Union Congregational Church area

General information
- Architectural style: Carpenter Gothic
- Location: 302 St. Clair Abrams Ave., Tavares, Florida, United States
- Construction started: 1885
- Completed: 1888
- Client: Union Congregational Church

Technical details
- Structural system: wooden

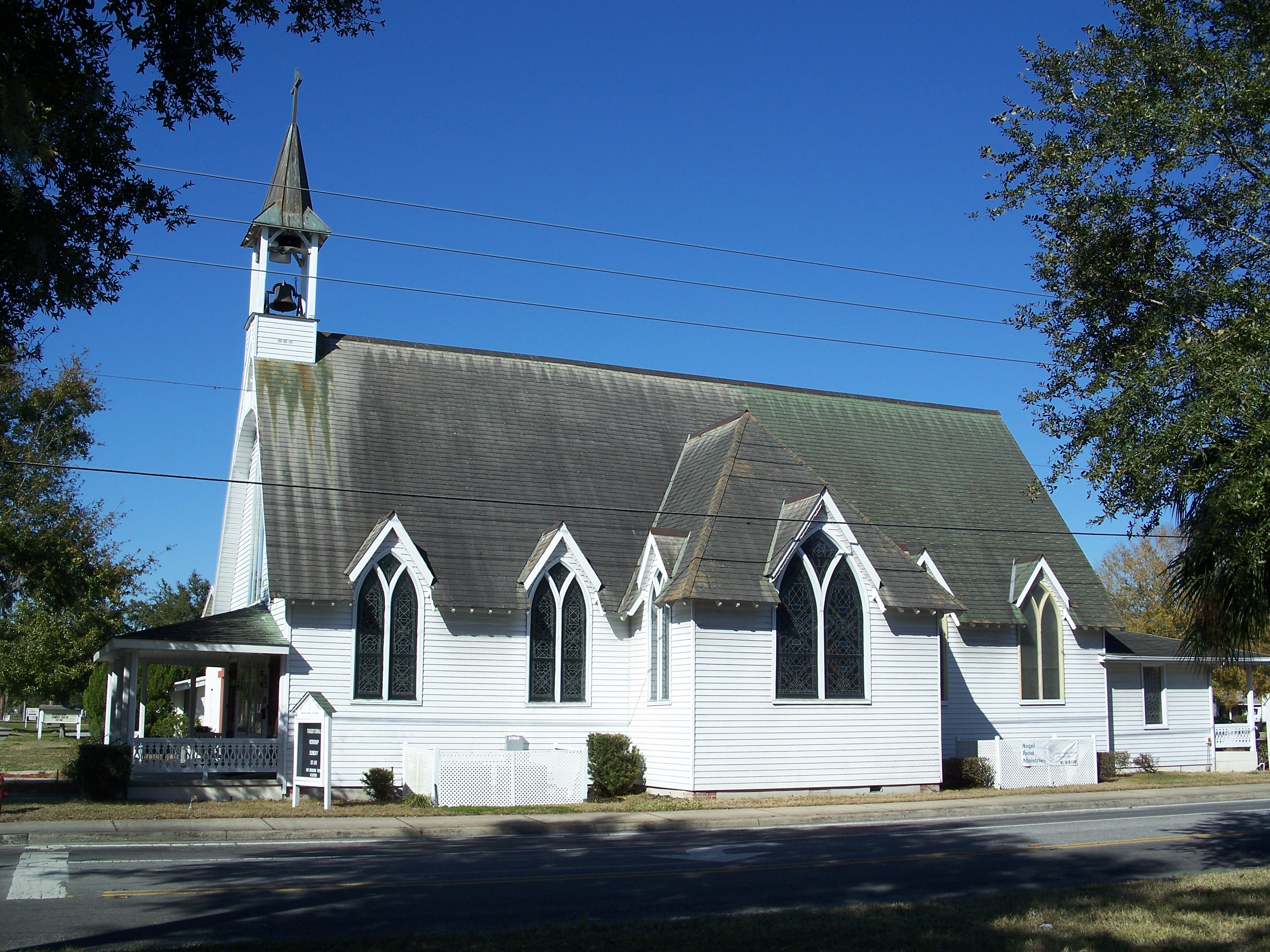

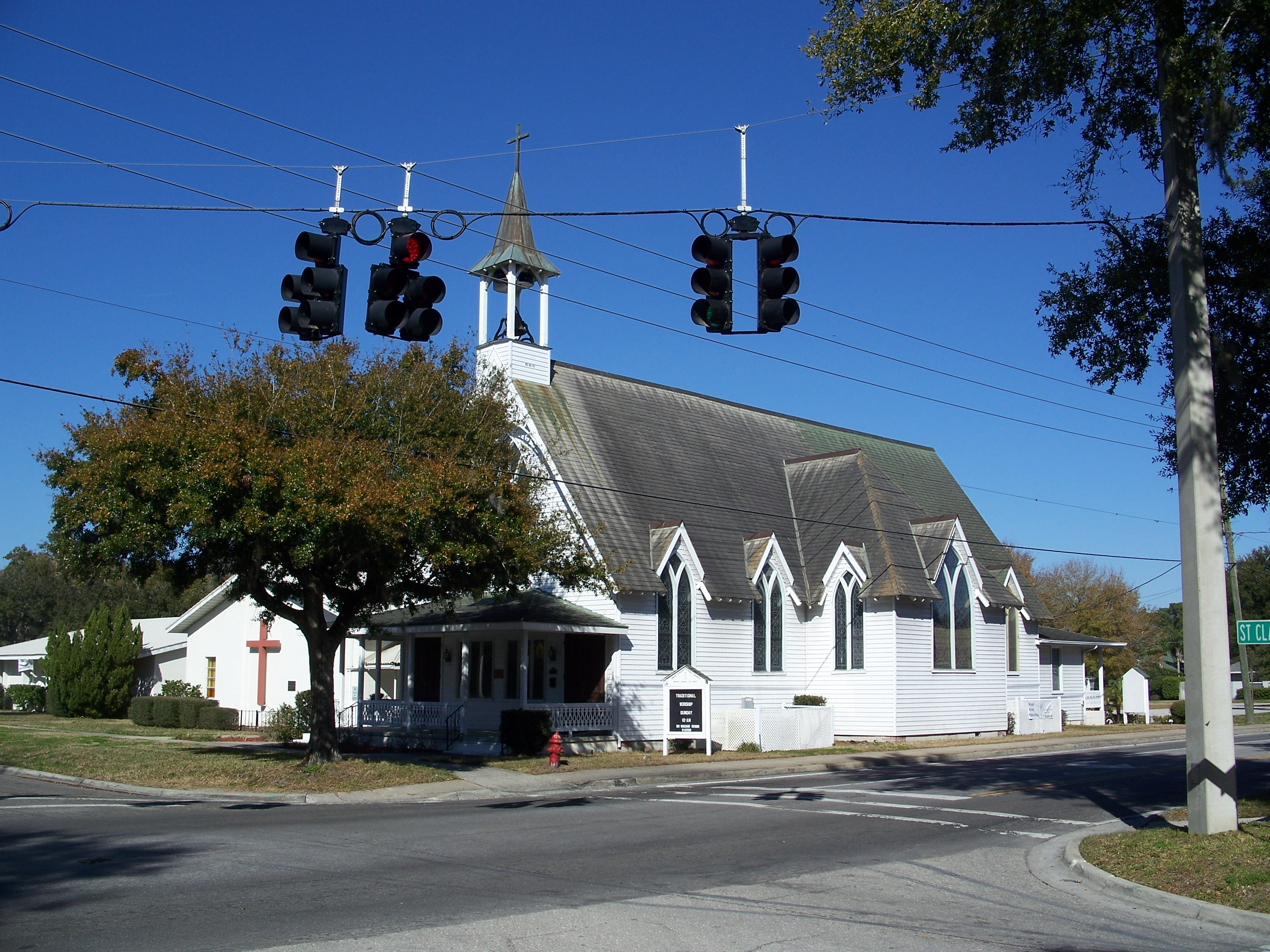

The Union Congregational Church is a historic Carpenter Gothic style United Church of Christ church building located at 302 St. Clair Abrams Avenue in Tavares, Florida. The congregation was organized in 1885 and the church was built on land donated by the founder of Tavares, Major Alexander H. St. Clair Abrams. The building was expanded in 1988. In 1989, the church was listed as in A Guide to Florida's Historic Architecture, published by the University of Florida Press."

Union Congregational Church is still an active congregation.
