= Melton Haynes =

American Confederate soldier

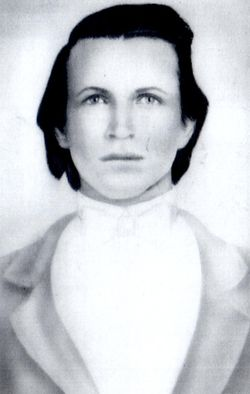
- Born: 21 March 1827
- Died: 10 January 1883 (aged 55)
- Burial place: Yalaha Cemetery
- Spouse: Sarah Isabella Vaught
- Military career
- Allegiance: Confederate States of America
- Branch: Confederate States Army
- Service years: 1863-1865
- Rank: Captain
- Units: Co. H, 5th Regiment, Florida Cavalry, C.S.A.

Melton Haynes (March 21, 1827 – January 10, 1883) was a Confederate soldier, civil engineer and early settler of Lake County, Florida. He is known for bringing the first sweet oranges to central Florida. He was born in Whiteville, North Carolina to Bythel and Zylphia Nichols Haynes as the fourth of ten children. As a youth, Haynes experienced bouts of severe muscle and joint pain and it was recommended that he move to a warmer climate. Haynes traveled to Florida in 1845 with his younger brother Bunberry. They settled in what is now Leesburg, Florida on a bluff across Lake Astatula, naming their settlement Haynes Point. During this time, Haynes earned money by surveying the untamed landscape of Lake County, as well as by selling sweet potatoes he planted. It was also during this time that Haynes fought in the Seminole Wars during the uprising in 1848. He married Sarah Isabella Vaught, whom he called Isa, in November 1849. He served as a member of the Florida House of Representatives in 1884 and 1885. He served as a member of the Florida Senate in 1866. Using the sweet orange seeds Haynes brought to the area, he planted a 160-acre grove on Haynes Point. Oranges were not native to Central Florida, so Haynes is credited with beginning what would become a flourishing citrus industry in the area. Haynes died in 1883 after falling from his horse and drowning due to injury. His home, called Woodlea and built in the cracker style, has been recreated at a park in Tavares, Florida.

== Military ==
He was commissioned into the Confederate army on Oct, 15th, 1863 as a 1st Lt. He fought in the battle of Marianna in Marianna, Fl, as well as the largest battle in Fl, the battle of Olustee in Baker County, Fl. He surrendered as a Captain on May 10, 1865 and was paroled on May 20, 1865.
