= Astor Bridge =

Bridge in Florida, United States of America

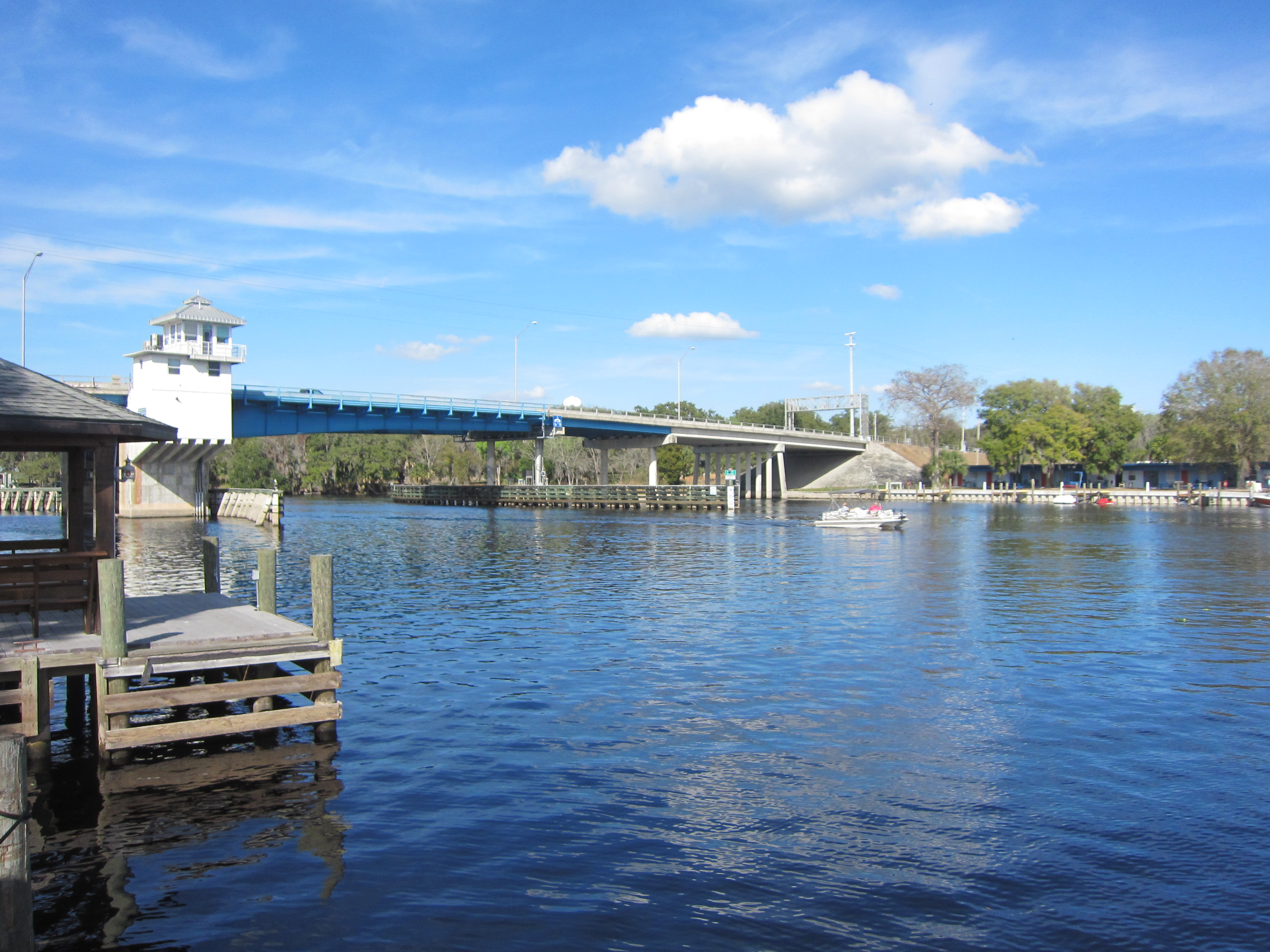
- The Astor Bridge from the Blackwater Inn
- Coordinates: 29.1675°N 81.5231°W
- Carries: SR 40 (two general purpose lanes)
- Crosses: St. Johns River
- Locale: Astor, Florida
- Official name: Astor Bridge
- Maintained by: Florida Department of Transportation
- ID number: 110077

Characteristics
- Design: Single-leaf bascule bridge
- Total length: 515 feet (157 m)
- Clearance below: 20 feet (6.1 m)

History
- Opened: October 1980

The Astor Bridge is a single-leaf bascule bridge located in Astor, Florida that carries State Road 40 over the St. Johns River into Volusia. The first bridge on the site was built in 1926; the current bridge dates from 1980.

== History ==
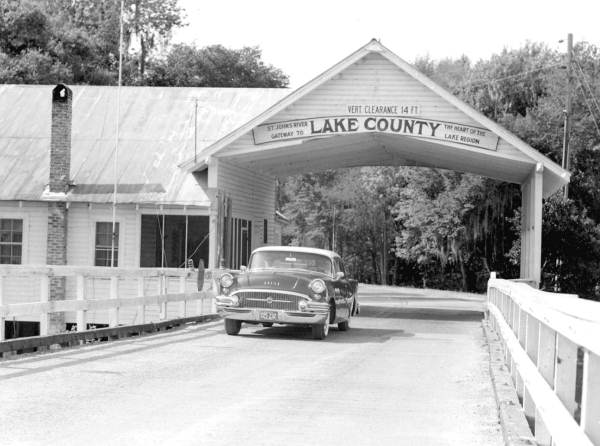
The original bridge in 1957

The original Astor Bridge, a wooden structure, was constructed across the St. Johns River in 1926; it replaced a ferry that crossed the river at Astor. A steel swing section was later constructed, replacing the original wooden structure.

The current Astor Bridge was built in 1980, after the previous bridge was deemed dangerous and restricted to vehicles under 10,000 pounds (4,500 kg). Residents favored a high-level bridge further south, but a drawbridge located adjacent to the existing bridge was considered the best option from cost and environmental standpoints.

The new bridge was constructed by the Houdallie-Duval-Wright Co. of Jacksonville, which had bid $4,060,575 for the project. It opened in October 1980. Following its construction, the previous bridge's bridge tender's house was moved to the Blackwater Inn adjacent to the bridge, then to the Pioneer Settlement for Creative Arts in Barberville for preservation and display.

After the construction of the current bridge, a naming dispute arose between the towns of Astor and Volusia, which was not resolved until 1989 when the bridge was officially named the Astor Bridge.

The bridge's decking was replaced in the early 1990s, and then again in a $788,000 project during 2012.

There are five bridge tenders who operate the bridge to allow river traffic to pass. It carries approximately 7,000 vehicles per day.

== Accidents ==
During the 1970s the bridge was considered by the Florida Department of Transportation to be "one of the most hazardous road sections in Florida".

The Astor Bridge was struck by a barge on March 23, 1995.

A safety net was tested on the bridge in 1995, to catch any vehicles that overran the bridge when it was open; the test was successfully completed.
