= Tavares Seaplane Base =

Airport in Florida, U.S.

- IATA: none; ICAO: none; FAA LID: FA1

Summary
- Airport type: Public
- Owner: City of Tavares
- Serves: Tavares, Florida
- Elevation AMSL: 63 ft (19 m)
- Coordinates: 28°47′43″N 081°43′16″W
- Website: www.tavares.org/...
- Interactive map of Tavares Seaplane Base

Runways
Direction	Length		Surface
Direction	ft	m	Surface
9/27	3,000	914	Water
- Source: Federal Aviation Administration

Tavares Seaplane Base (FAA LID: FA1) is a city-owned, public-use seaplane base located one nautical mile (1.85 km) southeast of the central business district of Tavares, a city in Lake County, Florida, United States.

The Tavares Seaplane Base was heavily damaged by Hurricane Irma in 2017. It was repaired and finally reopened in 2021. Construction awards were granted between 2018 and 2020, when building began around the start of the covid-19 pandemic.

The seaplane base has allowed the city of Tavares to brand itself as "America's Seaplane City." Not only is it home to a well-known flight school, but nearby businesses have also taken on the theme. The base also hosts regular fly-ins and events to attract both pilots and local residents.

== Facilities ==
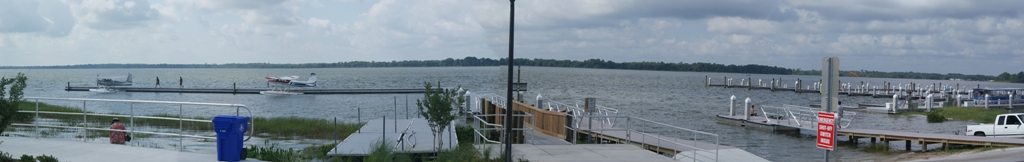
Panorama of the Tavares Seaplane Base & Marina on Lake Dora

Tavares Seaplane Base covers an area of 50 acres (20 ha) at an elevation of 63 feet (19 m) above mean sea level. The seaplane landing area on Lake Dora is designated 9/27 and measures 3,000 by 200 feet (914 x 61 m).

== See also ==
- List of airports in Florida
