= Volusia, Florida =

Volusia Maiaca Volusia Landing
- Unincorporated community
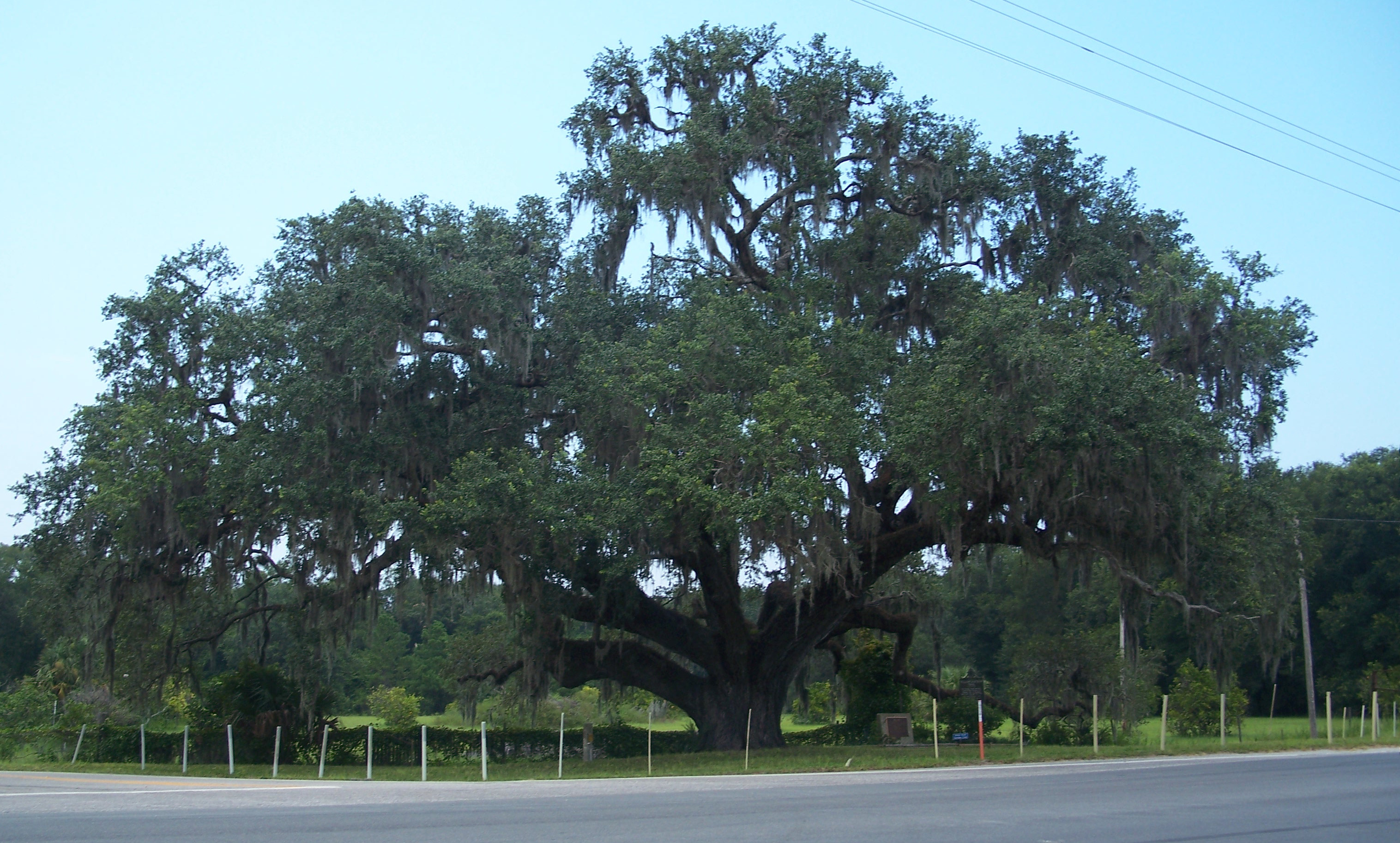
- Historic oak near the St. Johns River
- Nickname: "Town of Many Forts"
- Location within Volusia County
- Coordinates: 29°10′07″N 081°31′15″W
- Country: United States
- State: Florida
- County: Volusia
- Settled: Before 1558

Area
  - Total: 1.8 sq mi (4.7 km^{2})
- Elevation: 16 ft (5 m)

Population (2010) Estimated by adding count in all census blocks overlapping area of Volusia
  - Total: 596 (estimate)
  - Density: 330/sq mi (130/km^{2})
- Demonym: Volusian
- Time zone: UTC-5 (Eastern (EST))
  - Summer (DST): UTC-4 (EDT)
- ZIP code: 32102
- Area code: 352
- GNIS feature ID: 306545

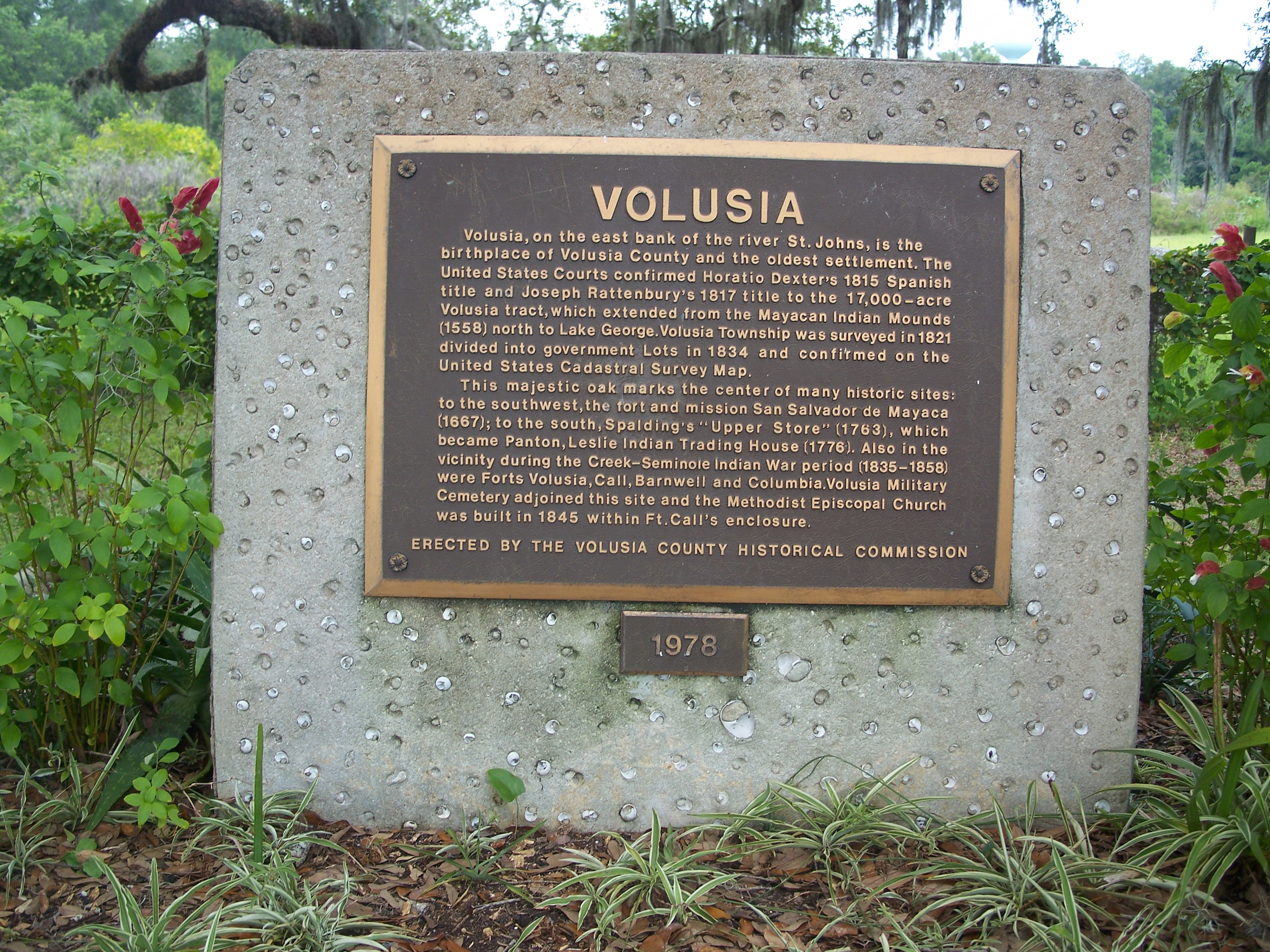
Historic plaque in Volusia

Volusia (/vəˈluːʃə/, və-LOO-shə) is an unincorporated community in Volusia County, Florida, United States, on the eastern shore of the St. Johns River. It is about three miles south of Lake George and across the river from the town of Astor in Lake County. Established by Spanish missionaries, Volusia is one of the oldest European settlements in Florida. The main route through the town is State Road 40, which crosses the St. Johns on the Astor Bridge.

Volusia County takes its name from the community of Volusia, which was named at least as early as 1815. The site of the community was an established indigenous settlement in 1558 when the Mayaca people were first encountered by Spanish explorers. Since then, it has been the site of forts established by the Spanish, British and Americans, in addition to related trading posts. These used the St. Johns River as the major transportation route. During the 1830s, it was the site of conflicts with the Seminole people as the United States government tried to force them to remove to Indian Territory west of the Mississippi River, during Florida's tumultuous beginnings.

== History ==
=== Pre-European ===
The indigenous Mayaca people inhabited much of the area now known as Volusia County along the St. Johns River. A settlement just south of current-day Lake George was known as Maiaca (or Mayaca) and it was likely the largest of the Mayaca villages. Historical sources frequently refer to the native Timucua as having inhabited large areas of Florida, including areas along the St. Johns river. However, other sources posit that the Mayaca were a distinct group of people with their own language, customs and settlements. Alliances were formed among smaller native groups. The village of Mayaca (also spelled Mayarca) was identified as belonging to the Outina confederation at one point, and being allied with the Saltwater Timucua at another.

According to Spanish Franciscan missionary Francisco de Ayeta in his 1691 deposition, the Mayaca lived south of Freshwater Timucua territory. He described them as "being so wild a nation and of no sense at all, who in no way want to make a village, nor even plant for their substenance, nor ever live in a determined place."

=== Spanish period (1566-1763) ===
Map depicting town of Majaco, c. 1763

The first European documentation of present-day Volusia was by Hernando de Escalante Fontaneda, who in memoirs covering the period of 1558-1575, mentions Mayaca.

In 1566, Pedro Menéndez de Avilés made a voyage up the St. Johns river to meet with principal caciques (chiefs). He recorded encountering the village of a cacique known as Macoya. This is believed to be the same site as the Mayaca mission noted in Spanish records of the early 17th century, and thus historic Volusia. After the explorer ventured a little farther up river, Macoya threatened Menéndez with war unless he turned back.

By about 1602, Franciscan missionaries had established a church at Mayaca and reported 100 natives there who had not yet been baptized. The general consensus among the Spanish at the time was that the Mayaca were a distinct people from the (Sweetwater) Timucua, although the occupied part of the territory traditionally identified as Timucuan.

The mission of San Salvador de Mayaca appeared on a list of missions in 1655. In 1657, the mission church of San Salvador de Mayaca was constructed on the existing shell mounds of the Mayaca people, in what is present-day Volusia.

In about 1680, the area was settled by colonists and became the second-oldest Spanish base in Florida after St. Augustine. The Spanish built a fort called Antonio de Anacape in 1680. Slabs of crude mortar from that fort have been found on a small Indian mound about 500 yards from Volusia's Landing.

In 1689, the Spanish made a list of Timucua-speaking missions that includes the mission of San Antonio de Mayaca with 30 families, or approximately 150 people. Historians have since documented strong evidence that Mayaca's inhabitants did not speak the Timucua language.

A 1717 census conducted by the Spanish refers to the native village of San Joseph de Jororo (Maiaca Language) and enumerates 33 natives.

By the mid-18th century, the Mayaca had suffered high mortality by invasions of native tribes from the north, including the Yamassee and the Euchees.

=== British period (1763-1783) ===
In 1763, Great Britain defeated France in the Seven Years' War, and conducted an exchange with Spain to take over East Florida. James Spaulding and Roger Kelsall partnered to open five stores in Florida, including one in Volusia known as Spaulding's "Upper Store." The store is believed to have operated on the west bank of the St. Johns river near Volusia from between at least 1765 and 1787.

=== Second Spanish period (1783-1819) ===
After the American Revolutionary War, the British transferred Florida back to Spain in the Treaty of Versailles, as they ceded other territory of the colonies to the newly independent Americans. The United States allowed James Spaulding's Upper and Lower stores to continue operating.

The Spaulding's Upper store later came under the ownership of Panton, Leslie & Company and was known as Panton, Leslie Trading House. It operated on the east bank at Volusia from 1787 until at least 1834.

The first known use of Volusia (with variations in spelling) as a geographic place name occurs in 1815. It was documented in a series of Spanish Land Grants and Confirmed Claims as follows:

Horatio S. Dexter vs United States, 4/5/1815 claim: Dexter deposes before the Board, September 8, 1824 that Joseph Hernandez came in April 1821 to his plantation, Volucia, to obtain "boats and hands" to survey his land and the surveyor was Burgevin. Burgevin certified the survey on that date.

To Sect. of Treasury, Rush Amiens 15, Octobre In November 1817, the Spanish Government agreed to my claim for land in Velutia. James Alexander, my attorney, proceeded to St. Augustine to carry these transactions into effect; he was occupied with the voyage and these transactions when cession of the Floridas was ratified 19th February 1819. Meanwhile U.S. settlements have been commenced. Mitchell, Alexander and Dexter have interveined(sic) in my behalf to explain my delay. Signed Joseph Rattenbury

F.M. Arredondo petitions for his claim of 3/21/1817, to 30,000 acres as follows: 15,000 acres west of the St. Johns River, by the path of the Chocochale Indians across from the Panton, Leslies, known as the Upper Store on the east side of the river.

Burgevin certifies 5,000 acres waste lands on west side of the St. Johns between the Panton, Leslie store, opposite side and lands which the Widow (sic) Pengree cultivated, ending in front of the Horse Landing, also east side, 4/5/1821.

H. Dexter presented his claim to 2,000 acres, known as the Volusia tract, applied for in 1815 and recorded 10th Septembre, 1818, Spanish Royal Title.

=== American period (1819-Present) ===
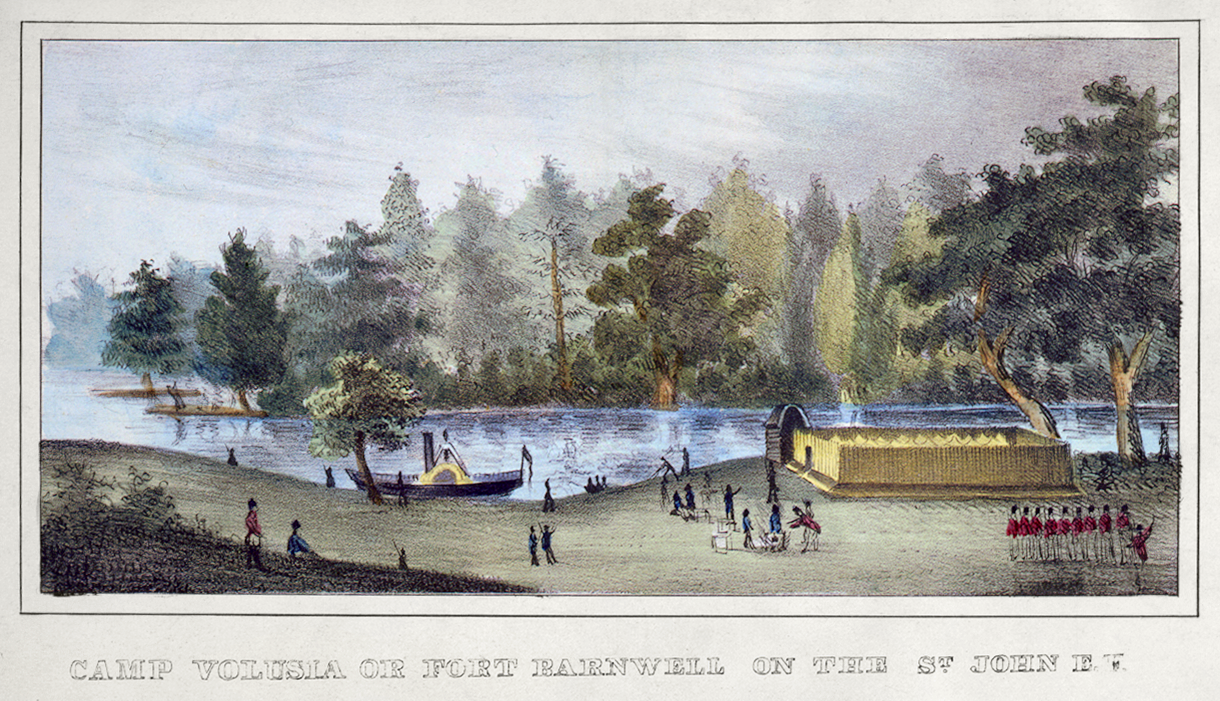
Camp Volusia 1837

By 1822, Volusia is described by William Hayne Simmons in his Notices of East Florida as "...a very fine tract, lying on both sides of the St John's (sic) - the greater portion being on the western side of the river." The author says that the settlement was made nearly three years ago by Horatio S. Dexter, its present proprietor.

When the Florida legislature divided Orange County on December 29, 1854 to organize an independent Volusia County, the new jurisdiction was named after its largest community, Volusia. At the time, Volusia County had about 600 residents.

=== Etymology ===
The origin of the name Volusia remains uncertain as there exists no documentation establishing the etymology. There are several theories:

1. The name came from a word meaning "Land of the Euchee," from the Euchee who migrated into the area after the Timucua Indian cultures faded away in the early 18th century. The Euchee (or Uchee) occupied the area between Spring Garden and the southern tip of Lake George. Records prior to 1815 referred to this area as Euchee territory. The name Volusia was spelled as Velutia by the French and Volucia by the Spanish, reflecting their phonetics.
2. The name was taken from a British man named Voluz who owned a plantation in the late 18th century that was located on the St. Johns River.
3. The name originated from the last name Veluche, belonging to the French or Belgian owner of the trading post in Volusia. According to some, this was during the British regime. Others say that it was around 1818, after the United States acquired the territory. Over time, the name Veluche became anglicized to Volusia.
4. The town was established by and named for Jere Volusia.
5. The Spanish named the settlement after the celebrated Roman jurist Lucius Volusius Maecianus, who wrote 30 books and tutored Marcus Aurelius, Roman emperor and philosopher.

== Notes ==
- The community is near the setting of The Yearling, a 1938 book by Marjorie Kinnan Rawlings. It is mentioned in the story.
