= Lake County Library System =

Coordinates: 28.8042°N 81.7319°W

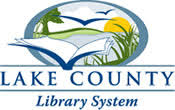
- Location: Lake County, Florida
- Established: 1982
- Branches: 16

Other information
- Website: www.mylakelibrary.org

The Lake County Public Library System (LCLS) is a library system located in Lake County, Florida.

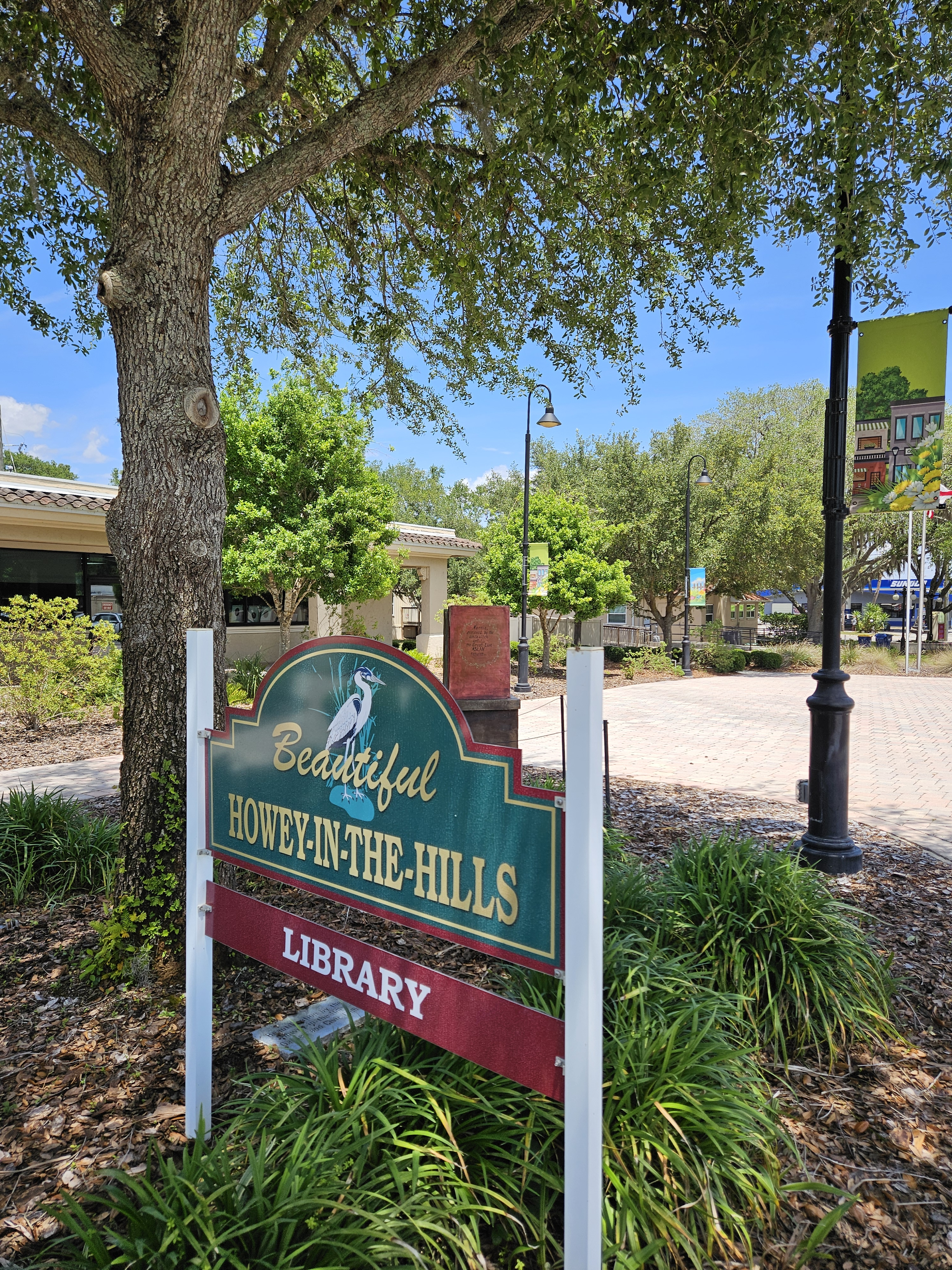
The main sign and an art installation at the Marianne Beck Memorial Library (a.k.a. the Howey-In-The-Hills Library)

== History ==
The Lake County Library System began in 1975 when the Lake County Library Planning Advisory Board was created to make a recommendation to the Board of County Commissioners for a county wide library system.

Mr. Cecil Beach, consultant, was retained to perform a feasibility study and make recommendations based on information obtained. Beach advised the advisory board to adopt the Inter-local Agreement Format for the county's library organization. The advisory board concurred with his recommendation and reported that to the board of County Commissioners.

On September 29, 1982, the Lake County Board of County Commissioners authorized the signature of the county ordinance that established the county-wide library system. Charter members of the Lake County Library system were Cooper Memorial Library in Clermont, Eustis Memorial Library and the Umatilla Public Library.

By 1997, the Mount Dora Public Library, renamed the W.T. Bland Public Library, the Fruitland Park Library and the Lady Lake Library joined the Lake County Library System. The Eustis Memorial Library withdrew from the Lake County Library System, rejoining in 2020.

Today the Lake County Library System is governed by the Lake County Board of County Commissioners. The cooperative still operates through inter-local agreements between the governing bodies of its 10 member libraries, and through the operation of 6 branch libraries, with an administrative office in Tavares, Florida. The current Director of Library Services is VACANT.

The Lake County Library System mission is “To serve as the gateway to the world of information, ideas and entertainment for all county residents”.

== Libraries ==
- Astor Branch Library in Astor.
- Cagan Crossings Community Library in Four Corners.
- Cooper Memorial Library in Clermont.
- East Lake Branch Library in Sorrento.
- Eustis Memorial Library in Eustis.
- Fruitland Park Library in Fruitland Park.
- Helen Lehmann Memorial Library in Montverde.
- Lady Lake Public Library in Lady Lake.
- Leesburg Public Library in Leesburg
- Marianne Beck Memorial Library in Howey in the Hills.
- Marion Baysinger Memorial Library in Groveland.
- Minneola Schoolhouse Library in Minneola.
- Paisley Branch Library in Paisley.
- Tavares Public Library in Tavares.
- Umatilla Public Library in Umatilla.
- W.T. Bland Public Library in Mount Dora.

== Services ==
Residents of Lake County have access to print and digital resources with an LCLS library card. These resources include print books, audiobooks and e-books, as well as music and movies. The libraries also provide patrons with access to online resources, including internet access and online reference databases. In addition to resource materials, LCLS provides outreach services to patrons of all ages.

Library cards are free to Lake County residents. Residents of Volusia, Seminole, and Marion counties can receive a free LCLS card by showing a valid library card from their county. Non-Resident memberships are also available for a fee for those not eligible for a reciprocal borrowing library card. Students enrolled in Lake County Schools are eligible for a free LCLS card regardless of residence by showing proof of enrollment.

Lake County Library System additionally offers the following services:

- Libby (e-books)
- Career Online High School
- Adult Literacy Program
- Ask a Librarian
- Accelerated Reading Lists
- Books by Mail
- Technology Classes
- Friends of the Library
- Legal Resources
- Voter Registration Services
- Reciprocal Borrowing
- Talking Books for Sight Impaired
- Hoopla (Leesburg Public Library)
- Kanopy (Leesburg Public Library)

== Databases ==
Lake County Library System also provides links to several databases for the convenience of their users. These databases include:

- ABC Mouse: For early learning for children ages 2–8
- Ancestry Library: Allows users to search ancestry history through ancestry.com
- AtoZ Databases: Provides users job search functions, reference, free E-mail services, and person/business search functions
- Employ Florida Marketplace: Designed to connect job seekers and employers in the state of Florida.
- Flipster: Digital magazine catalog
- Florida Electronic Library: Allows users to search the Lake County Library System for magazines, books, newspapers and more.
- Heritage Quest
- LinkedIn Learning: Allows users access to open online courses in business, technology, and creative
- New York Times
- Occupational Outlook Handbook
- Overdrive/Libby Catalog
- Pronunciator
- Tumblebooks Catalog
- TumbleMath
- Tutor.com: Connects students to tutors online.
- WorldCat Database: Allows users to search libraries worldwide.

== Library Locations and Histories ==
Astor County Library – 54905 Alco Road, Astor, FL 32102

Cagan Crossings Community Library (Four Corners) – 16729 Cagan Oaks, Clermont, FL 34714

Opening in February 2008, the state-of-the-art library contains 30 public access computers and wireless hookups. At 19,000 square feet the library houses 47,000 materials, reference assistance, children's and adult programming, and daily courier service from other Lake County libraries. The building was designed by Harvard Jolly Architecture and cost $8,000,000.

Cooper Memorial Library (Lake-Sumter State College, South Lake Campus) – 2525 Oakley Seaver Drive, Clermont, FL 34711

The Cooper memorial library has had many homes. In 1906 the library books were kept in the home of Mrs. Payson Pierce until 1910 when they were moved to another library organization members home, Isaiah Benson. A year later the books were moved to a small Baptist church. Wanting to give the books a permanent home, club member, Mrs. Alice Cooper leased a lot on DeSoto near the current City Hall in downtown Clermont and for $600 the library construction was secured. The financial support initially came from the local Clermont Woman's Club, who were also the first librarians to manage the circulating books. Four decades later, the city created the Cooper Memorial Library Association, in order to manage it as a public library. In 2009 it made its move the Historic District and was restored into a museum. To continue serving the community a new Cooper Memorial Library was built. Breaking ground on June 30, 2008, the new 50,000 square-foot library was built at Lake-Sumter Community College's South Lake Campus. The library is still considered a public library and is open to both the college students and the public.

East Lake County Library – 31340 S. County Road 437, Sorrento, FL 32776

Eustis Memorial Library – 120 North Center St., Eustis, FL 32726

Eustis is one of several towns in Lake County dating back to the 1870s, and as of 2023, is home to the nation's longest-running Washington Birthday Celebration (now named GeorgeFest). The Eustis Memorial Library was founded in 1902, and The Eustis Public Library Association purchased the 1 ½ story Aber Cottage on Grove Street between Magnolia and Orange Avenues (about where City Hall stands today) for $1,200 in 1912. Mrs. Clark, the librarian, moved into the upstairs and maintained the library downstairs.

The Library later moved into a new building on the corner of Grove Street and Orange Avenue, now known as City Hall. Cary Hardee, 23rd Governor of Florida, dedicated the building on May 1, 1923 at a ceremony attended by at least 250 people. The new library building cost an extraordinary $12,843.54, with landscaping donated by Dr. J. J. Ervin. In December, Rufus A. Perry, Commander of the American Legion, asked that the name “Eustis Public Library” be changed to “Eustis Memorial Library” in honor of those soldiers who had given their lives in World War I.

In March 1985, the Library moved into the building where it still operates today, occupying an entire City block on N. Center Street and East Magnolia Avenue. Volunteers from the community lined up starting at the Library's old location on Grove Street to the current location on Center Street, passing books along from one building to the other. The N. Center Street building has previously been occupied by many businesses, including a Winn-Dixie, a roller skating rink, a laundromat, a shoe store, and a beauty salon.

The Library today offers a collection of 100,000+ items, a robust schedule of programs for all ages, rotating exhibits featuring the art of local artists, a bookstore, e-books, databases, WiFi, public access computers, device charging stations, mobile printing and more.

Fruitland Park Library – 604 W. Berckman St., Fruitland Park, FL 34731

Helen Lehmann Memorial Library – 17435 Fifth St., Montverde, FL 34756

Lady Lake Public Library – 225 W. Guava St., Lady Lake, FL 32159

Leesburg Public Library – 100 E. Main St., Leesburg, FL 34748

Marianne Beck Memorial Library – 112 W. Central Ave., Howey-in-the-Hills, FL 34737

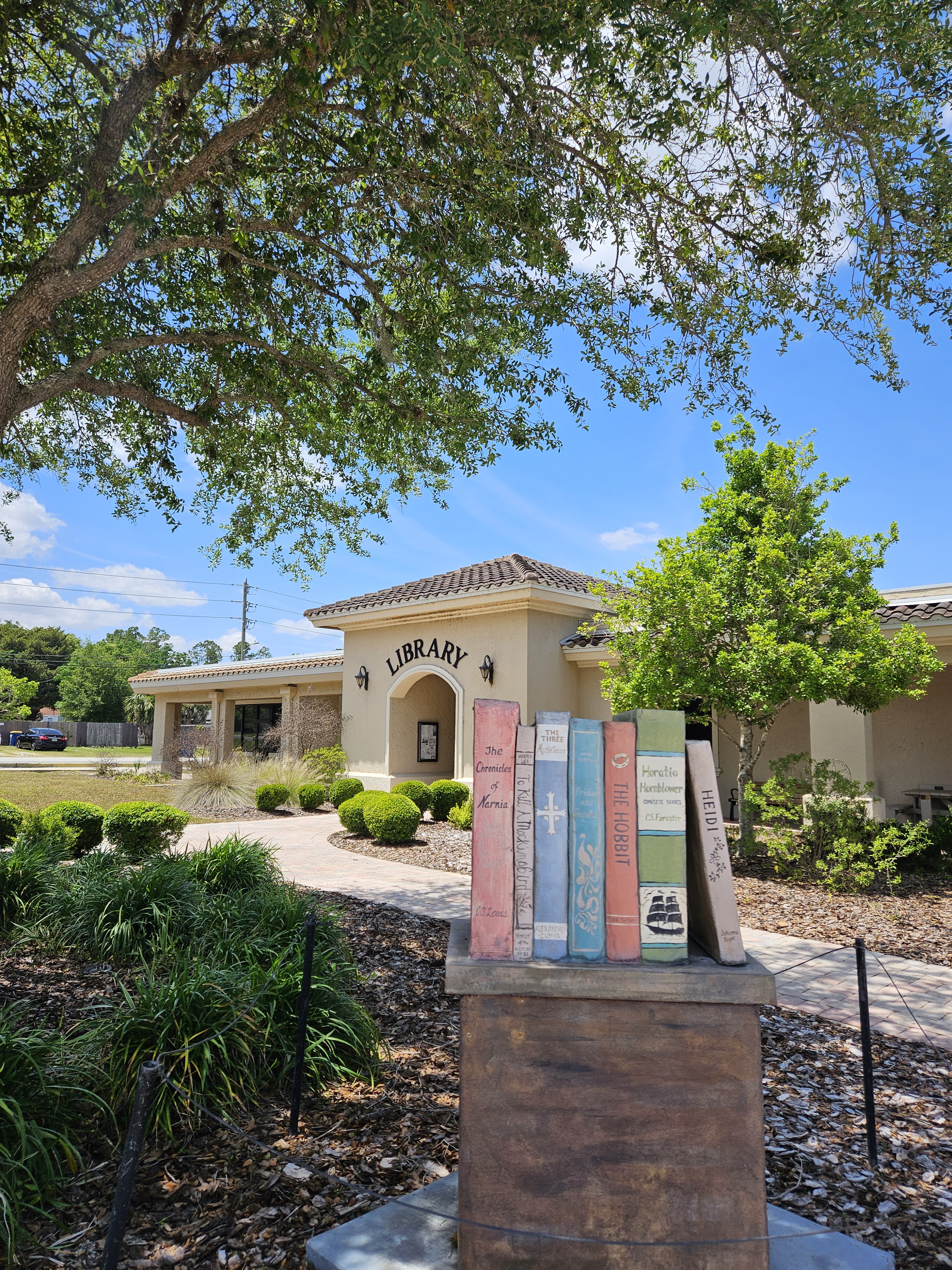
The main building of the Howey Library and an art installation found in front.

Marion Baysinger Memorial Library – 756 W. Broad St., Groveland, FL 34736

Minneola Schoolhouse Library – 100 S. Main Ave., Minneola, FL 34715

The town of Minneola was founded in 1884, originally as a part of Sumter County. After the town's conception, the children of the town had to attend school in a local church building. However, in the late 1800s, the residents of Minneola built a schoolhouse.

Originally, the schoolhouse consisted of 1-2 rooms and a belltower. In 1915, the county conducted a school merger. A larger school was built in nearby Clermont, and the Minneola Schoolhouse closed its doors. After the closure, the schoolhouse was converted into a home. The homeowners performed renovations on the old schoolhouse, but kept much of its wooden exterior and wood flooring intact.

The city of Minneola acquired the historic building for $150,000 in 2007. The schoolhouse was the first historic property purchased by the city of Minneola. After the purchase, the city began receiving donations of historic items related to the schoolhouse, such as old photographs, and an old school desk. The city bought the old schoolhouse with the intention of converting it into a library and museum. Two years after the purchase of the building, the once-schoolhouse-turned-library had its grand opening on April 18, 2009.

The Minneola Schoolhouse Library is now open Monday-Friday, 10:00 am – 5:00 pm. The library offers a variety of services to its community, such as public computers, faxing, printing, scanning, and curbside pickup. The Minneola Schoolhouse Library also hosts a variety of monthly events for its community.

Paisley County Library – 24954 County Road 42, Paisley, FL 32767

Tavares Public Library – 314 N. New Hampshire Ave., Tavares, FL 32778

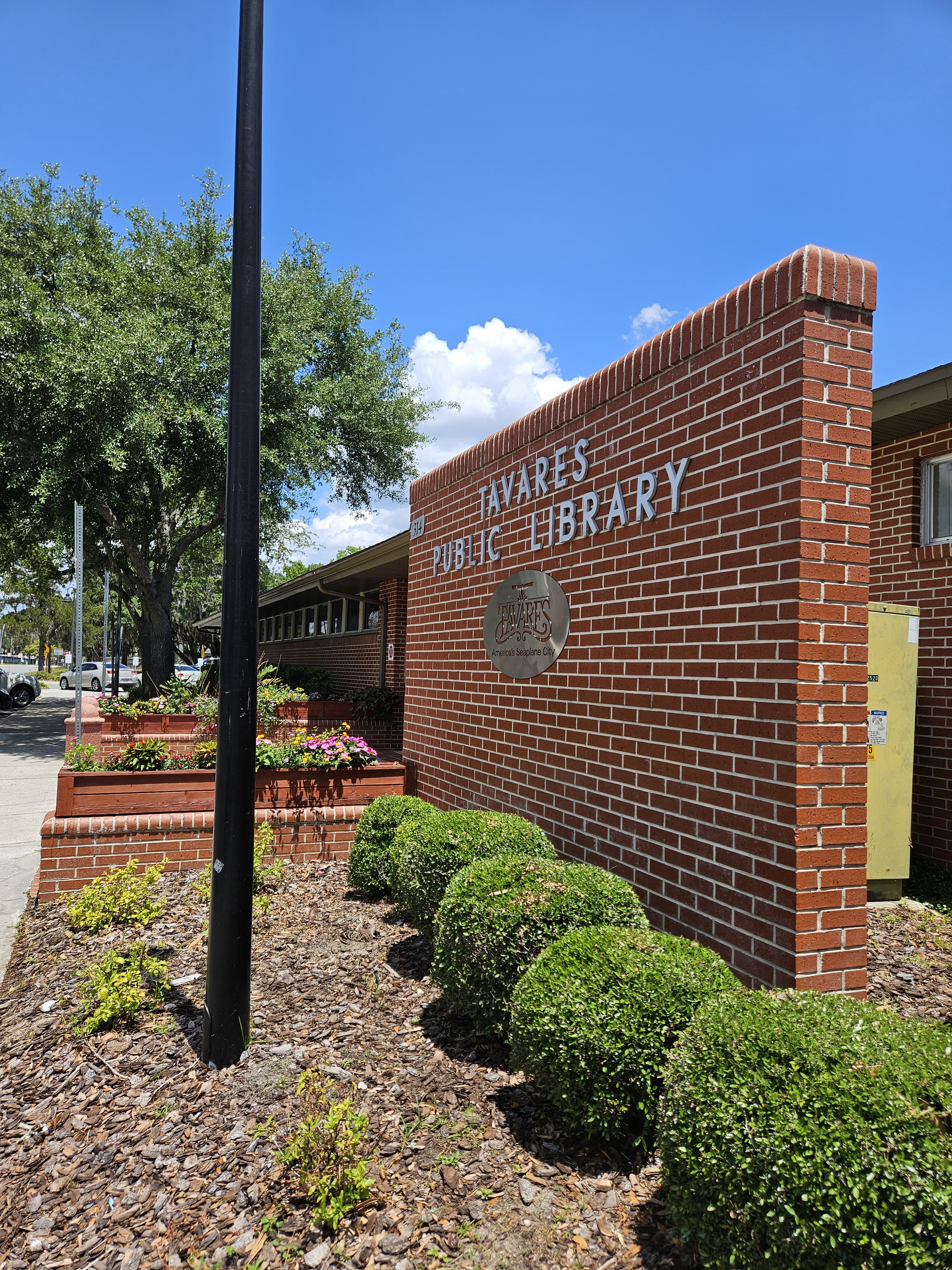
The sign and main entrance of the Tavares Public Library.

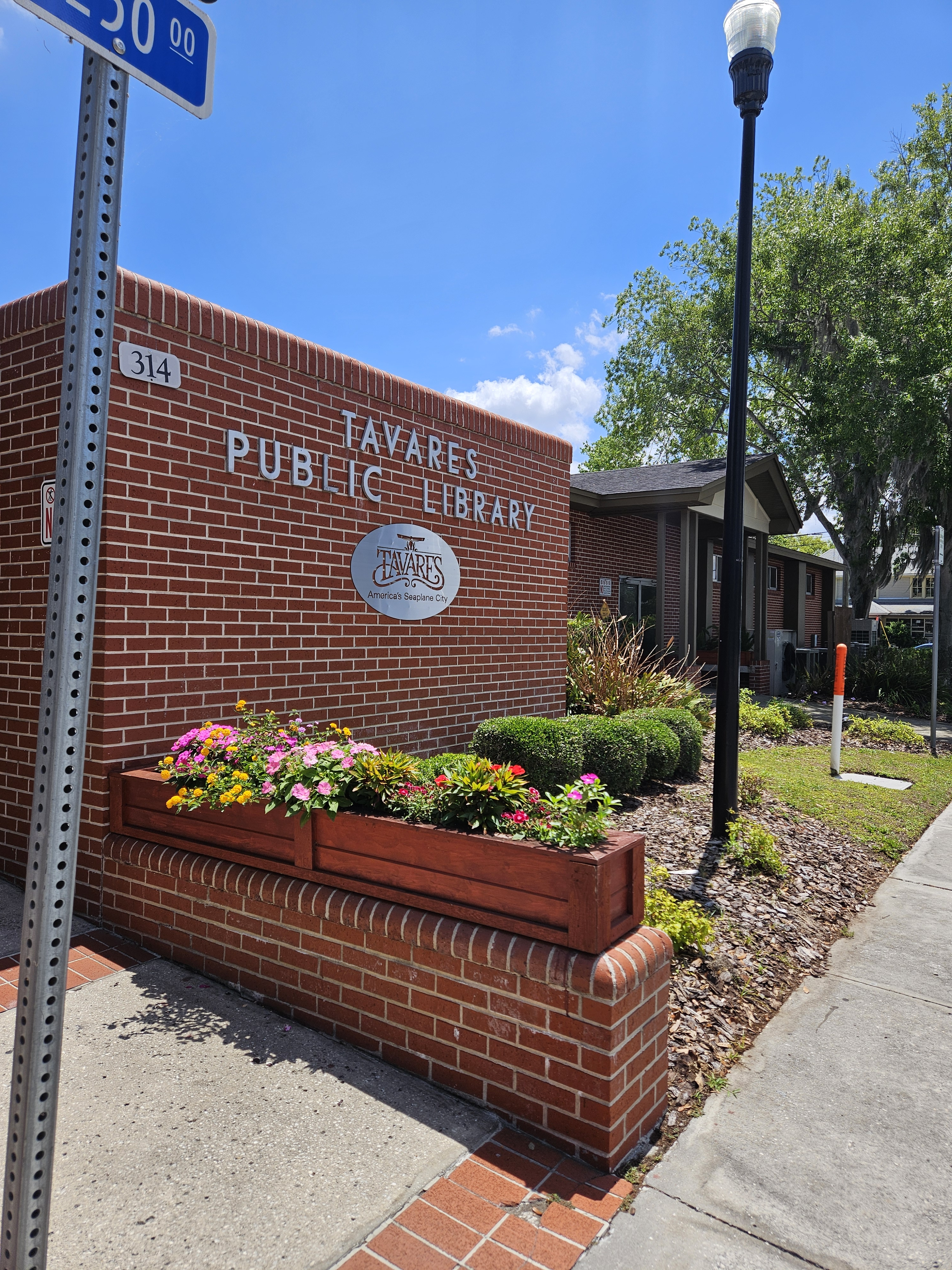
The main sign of the Tavares Public Library as seen from the front of the building.

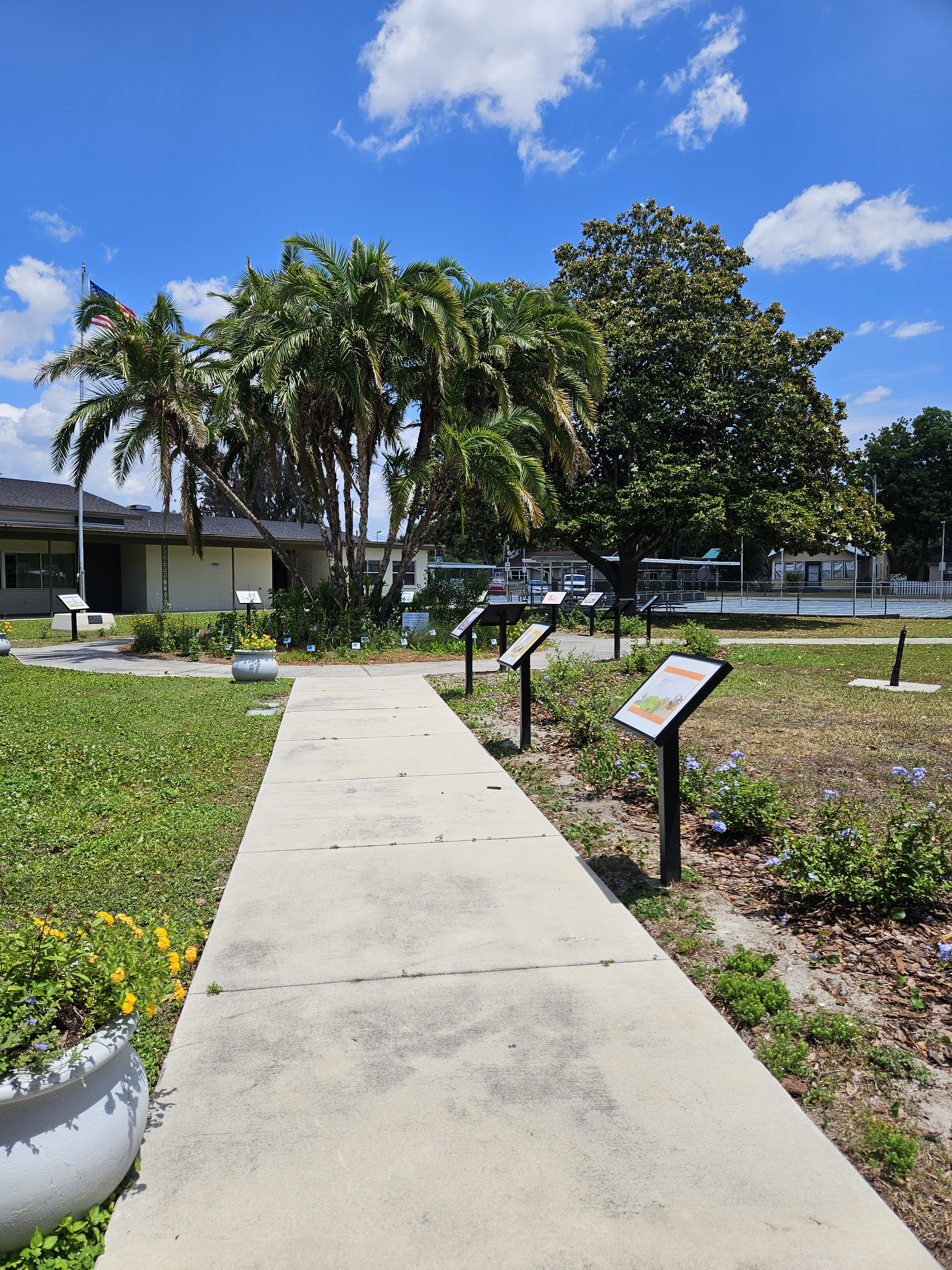
The Story Book Walk at the Tavares Public Library, located behind the building.

Umatilla Public Library – 412 Hatfield Drive, Umatilla, FL 32784

W.T. Bland Public Library – 1995 N. Donnelly St., Mount Dora, FL 32757

Originally built in 1905 the Mount Dora Library's 150-book collection resided in a small room located in Town Hall. The library soon outgrew its humble room and in 1917 was moved to a basement located in Education Hall, a private school. The building was prone to flooding and in 1929 the library was moved to its main floor. In 1965 a library branch was established in East Town, were most of the city's African American population resided. This allowed students to attend before integration. Continuing to outgrow itself a new building was built in 1976 in what the city's Parks and Recreation building is now. Its final home was built in 1995 with its most resent expansion being completed in 2012. The library now spans 21,000 square-feet allowing room for an archives room, a larger computer work area, community room, and a used bookstore.
