= Tavares, Florida =

- City
- City of Tavares
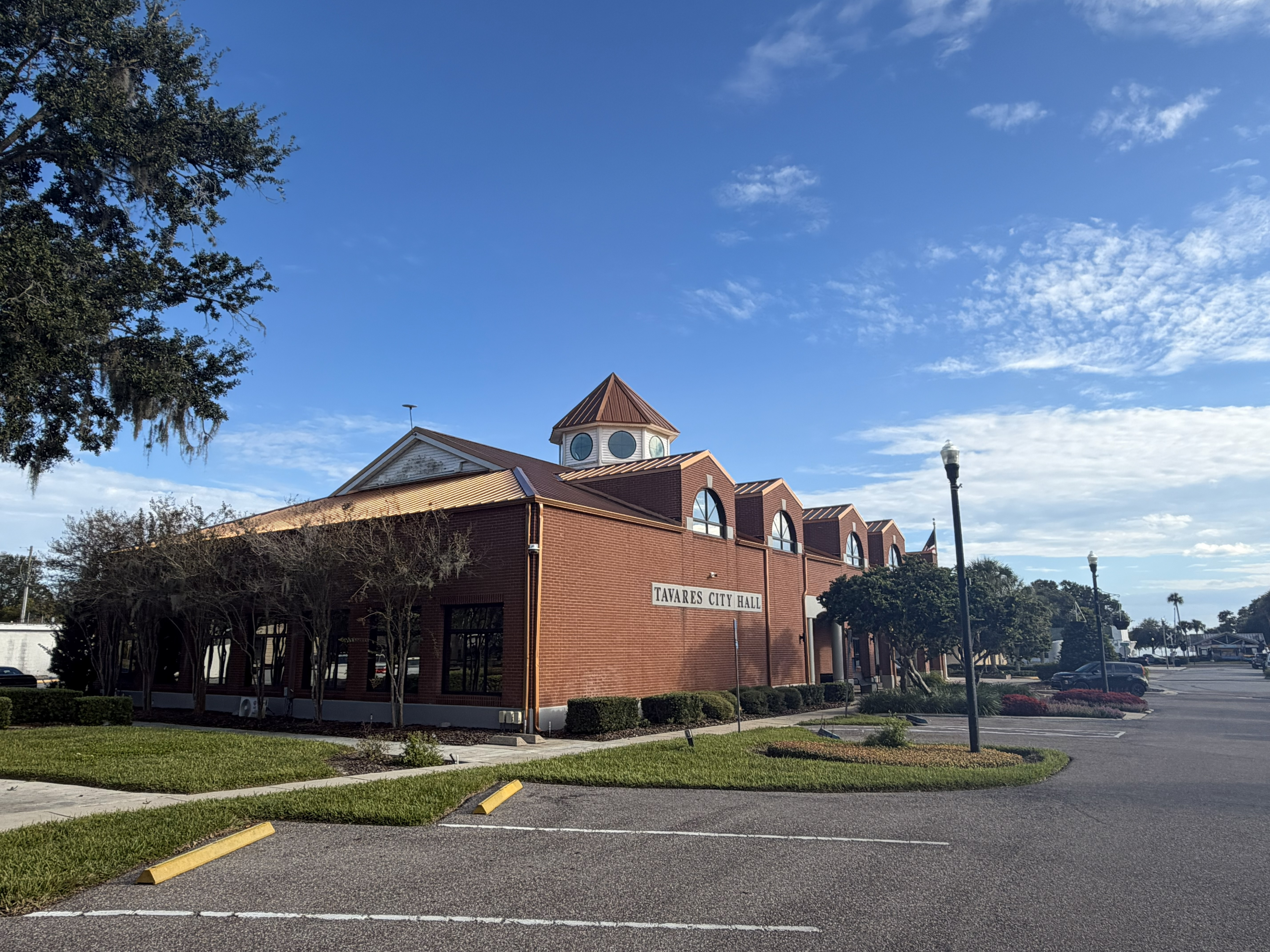
- Tavares City Hall

- Flag Logo
- Nickname: "America's Seaplane City!"
- Location in Lake County and the state of Florida

- Location in Florida Location in the United States
- Coordinates: 28°47′47″N 81°43′26″W
- Country: United States
- State: Florida
- County: Lake
- Founded: 1880

Area
  - Total: 13.97 sq mi (36.17 km^{2})
  - Land: 12.37 sq mi (32.03 km^{2})
  - Water: 1.60 sq mi (4.14 km^{2})
- Elevation: 118 ft (36 m)

Population (2020)
  - Total: 19,003
  - Estimate (2025): 22,490
  - Density: 1,536.7/sq mi (593.34/km^{2})
- Time zone: UTC-5 (Eastern (EST))
  - Summer (DST): UTC-4 (EDT)
- ZIP code: 32778
- Area code: 352
- FIPS code: 12-71225
- GNIS feature ID: 2405571
- Website: www.tavaresfl.gov

Tavares (/tʌvˈɛəriz/, tuh-VAIR-ees) is a city and the county seat of Lake County, Florida. Its population at the 2020 census was 19,003. It is part of the Orlando–Kissimmee–Sanford metropolitan statistical area.

== History ==
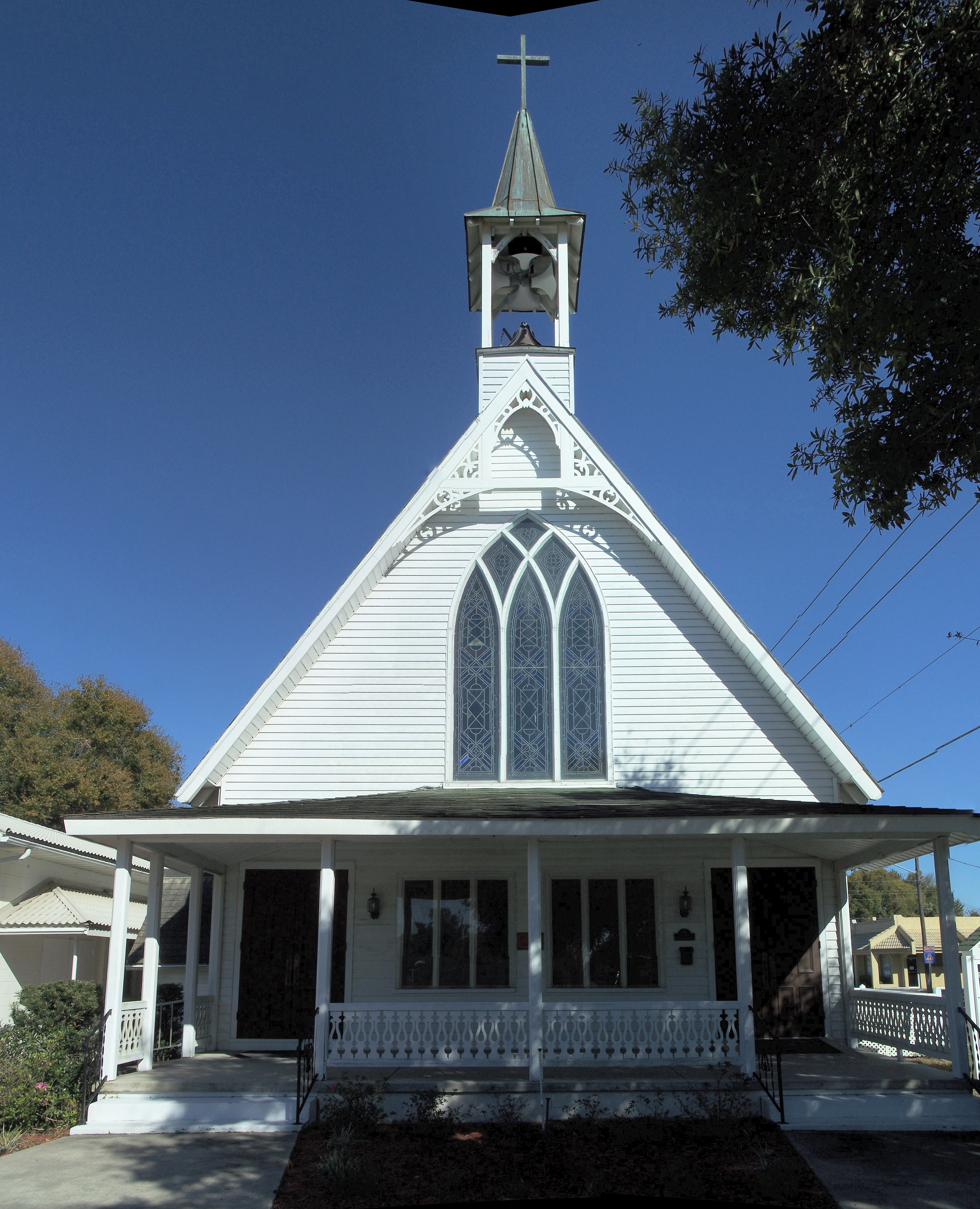
Union Congregational Church in Tavares

Organized in 1885, and completed in 1888 on land donated by St. Clair-Abrams, the Union Congregational Church was the first church in Tavares.

Tavares was founded in 1880 by Alexander St. Clair-Abrams, a newspaper and railroad man from a Creole family in New Orleans . He gave it the surname of a Portuguese ancestor. In 1883, a post office was established; by the next year, a hotel, three stores, a sawmill, and eight cottages were built. Investing over half a million dollars of his own money. St. Clair-Abrams's dream of Tavares as the state capital was not realized, but in 1887, it was designated the county seat of Lake County. St. Clair-Abrams later chartered a railroad from Tavares to Orlando. In 1919, Tavares incorporated as a town.

=== Groveland Four ===
In 1949, the Groveland Four were wrongly accused of raping a white woman in 1949. One was killed after fleeing, and three were convicted at trial in Tavares. The two adults were sentenced to death and the minor to life in prison. The Supreme Court of the United States overturned the verdict and ordered a new trial for the two capital defendants. One was killed while being transported to Tavares in 1951. Walter Irvin survived the shooting by the sheriff and was convicted again at trial. In 1955, his death sentence was commuted to life. He was paroled in 1968 and died in 1970. In 2016, the city of Groveland and Lake County formally apologized to families of all the men for injustice; in 2017, the Florida Legislature issued a formal apology and exonerated the men, calling on the governor to officially pardon them.

== Geography ==
Tavares sits on an isthmus between Lake Eustis to the north and Lake Dora to the south. The city of Eustis borders Tavares to the northeast, and Lake Harris is to the west.

U.S. Route 441 passes through the north side of Tavares, leading east 6 miles (10 km) to Mount Dora and west 10 miles (16 km) to Leesburg. Florida State Road 19 joins US 441 through part of Tavares, but leads northeast 5 miles (8 km) to Eustis and southwest 14 miles (23 km) to Florida's Turnpike in the outskirts of Groveland. Tavares is 32 miles (51 km) northwest of Orlando and 43 miles (69 km) southeast of Ocala.

According to the United States Census Bureau, Tavares has a total area of 13.7 square miles (35.6 km^{2}), of which 1.6 square miles (4.1 km^{2}), or 11.62%, are covered by water.

== Demographics ==
Historical population
| Census | Pop. | Note | %± |
|---|---|---|---|
| 1900 | 113 | | — |
| 1910 | 175 | | 54.9% |
| 1920 | 359 | | 105.1% |
| 1930 | 1,090 | | 203.6% |
| 1940 | 1,119 | | 2.7% |
| 1950 | 1,763 | | 57.6% |
| 1960 | 2,724 | | 54.5% |
| 1970 | 3,261 | | 19.7% |
| 1980 | 4,398 | | 34.9% |
| 1990 | 7,383 | | 67.9% |
| 2000 | 9,700 | | 31.4% |
| 2010 | 13,951 | | 43.8% |
| 2020 | 19,003 | | 36.2% |
| 2025 (est.) | 22,490 | | 18.3% |
U.S. Decennial Census

=== Racial and ethnic composition ===
Tavares racial composition (Hispanics excluded from racial categories) (NH = Non-Hispanic)
| Race | Pop 2010 | Pop 2020 | % 2010 | % 2020 |
|---|---|---|---|---|
| White (NH) | 11,047 | 12,932 | 79.18% | 68.05% |
| Black or African American (NH) | 1,349 | 2,304 | 9.67% | 12.12% |
| Native American or Alaska Native (NH) | 48 | 56 | 0.34% | 0.29% |
| Asian (NH) | 235 | 725 | 1.68% | 3.82% |
| Pacific Islander or Native Hawaiian (NH) | 7 | 7 | 0.05% | 0.04% |
| Some other race (NH) | 22 | 103 | 0.16% | 0.54% |
| Multiracial (NH) | 160 | 653 | 1.15% | 3.44% |
| Hispanic or Latino (any race) | 1,083 | 2,223 | 7.76% | 11.70% |
| Total | 13,951 | 19,003 | | |

=== 2020 census ===
As of the 2020 census, Tavares had a population of 19,003. The median age was 51.5 years. 16.9% of residents were under the age of 18 and 34.3% of residents were 65 years of age or older. For every 100 females there were 91.0 males, and for every 100 females age 18 and over there were 89.5 males age 18 and over.

There were 8,120 households in Tavares, including 4,337 families. Of all households, 21.1% had children under the age of 18 living in them. 45.3% were married-couple households, 16.5% were households with a male householder and no spouse or partner present, and 31.1% were households with a female householder and no spouse or partner present. About 33.1% of all households were made up of individuals and 21.0% had someone living alone who was 65 years of age or older.

99.1% of residents lived in urban areas, while 0.9% lived in rural areas.

There were 9,445 housing units, of which 14.0% were vacant. The homeowner vacancy rate was 2.6% and the rental vacancy rate was 9.9%.

Racial composition as of the 2020 census
| Race | Number | Percent |
|---|---|---|
| White | 13,540 | 71.3% |
| Black or African American | 2,374 | 12.5% |
| American Indian and Alaska Native | 80 | 0.4% |
| Asian | 738 | 3.9% |
| Native Hawaiian and Other Pacific Islander | 9 | 0.0% |
| Some other race | 690 | 3.6% |
| Two or more races | 1,572 | 8.3% |
| Hispanic or Latino (of any race) | 2,223 | 11.7% |

=== 2010 census ===
As of the 2010 United States census, 13,951 people, 6,070 households, and 3,749 families were living in the city.

=== 2000 census ===
As of the census of 2000, 9,700 people, 4,471 households, and 2,821 families resided in the city. The population density was 1,368.3 inhabitants per square mile (528.3/km^{2}). The 5,475 housing units had an average density of 772.3 per square mile (298.2/km^{2}). The city's racial makeup was 88.98% White, 7.70% African American, 0.30% Native American, 0.80% Asian, 0.07% Pacific Islander, 1.04% from other races, and 1.10% from two or more races. Hispanics or Latinos of any race were 3.46% of the population.

In 2000, of the 4,471 households, 16.1% had children under 18 living with them, 51.8% were married couples living together, 9.3% had a female householder with no husband present, and 36.9% were nor families. About 33.0% of all households were made up of individuals, and 21.2% had someone living alone who was 65 or older. The average household size was 2.01, and the average family size was 2.48.

In the city, the age distribution was 14.1% under 18, 5.8% from 18 to 24, 19.8% from 25 to 44, 22.2% from 45 to 64, and 38.0% were 65 or over. The median age was 56. For every 100 females, there were 92.8 males. For every 100 females 18 and over, there were 90.9 males.

The median income was $31,337 for a household and $36,243 for a family. Males had a median income of $28,911 versus $20,271 for females. The per capita income was $19,942. About 6.6% of families and 10.3% of the population were below the poverty line, including 18.2% of those under 18 and 6.9% of those 65 or older.

== Libraries ==
- Tavares Public Library
- The Lake County Library System is headquartered in Tavares.

== Transportation ==
The Tavares Seaplane Base is a city-owned, public-use seaplane base on Lake Dora in Tavares. The popular base gives rise to the city's nickname, "America's Seaplane City".

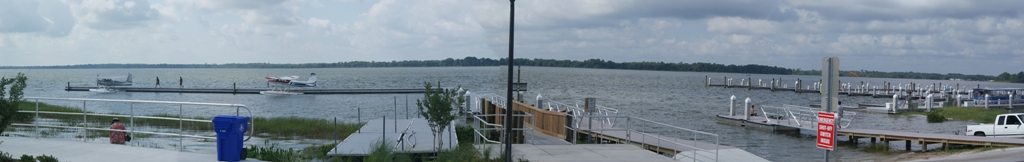
Panorama of the Tavares Seaplane Base and Marina on Lake Dora

The LakeXpress, Lake County's public transportation, has been active since May 2007. It is a fixed-route transportation service that runs every hour from Lady Lake to Mount Dora with circulator routes in Leesburg and Mount Dora.

== Notable people ==
- Alfred St. Clair-Abrams - politician
- Alexander St. Clair Abrams - politician and town's founder
- Rob Grill - lead singer of the Grass Roots rock band
- Melton Haynes = early settler
- Mallory Horne = member of the Florida Legislature
- Fireball Roberts - NASCAR driver
- Jermaine Taylor = NBA player

== Gallery ==
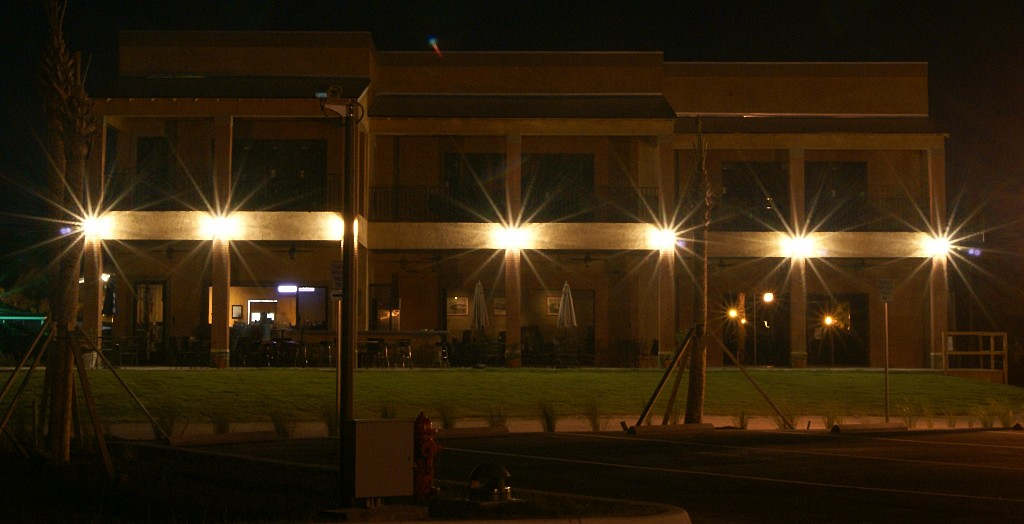
ALS Restaurant

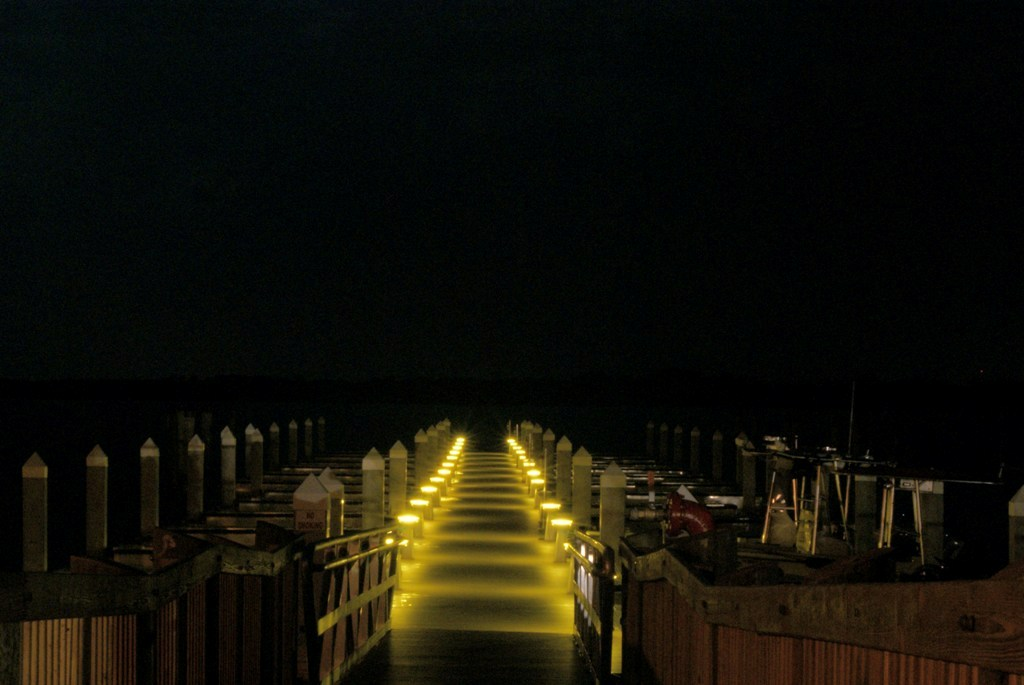
Dock

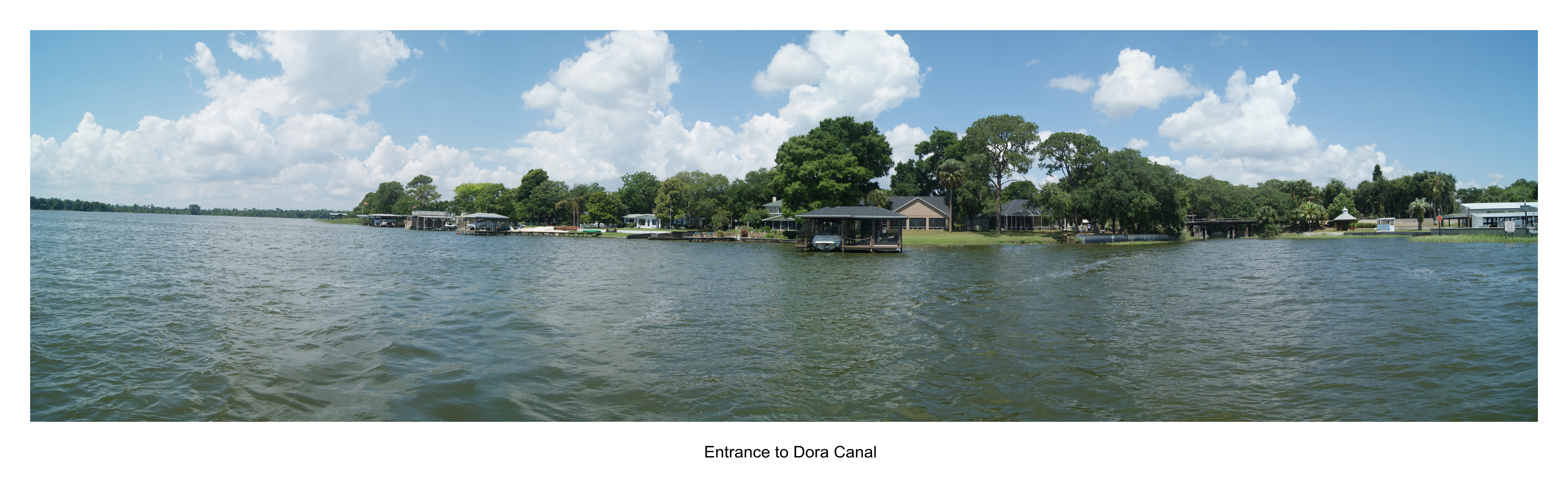
Dora Canal

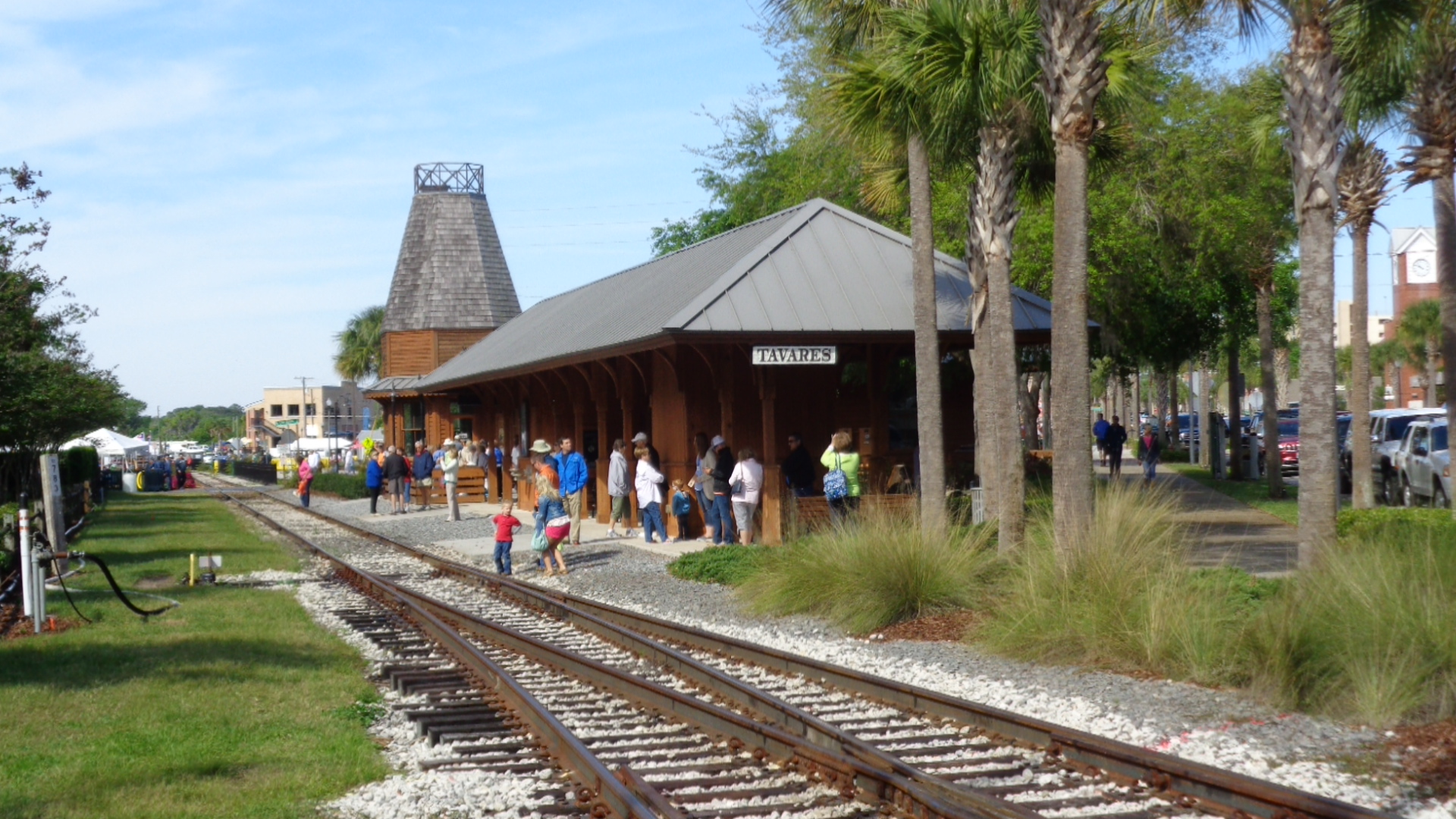
Royal Palm Railway Experience Station

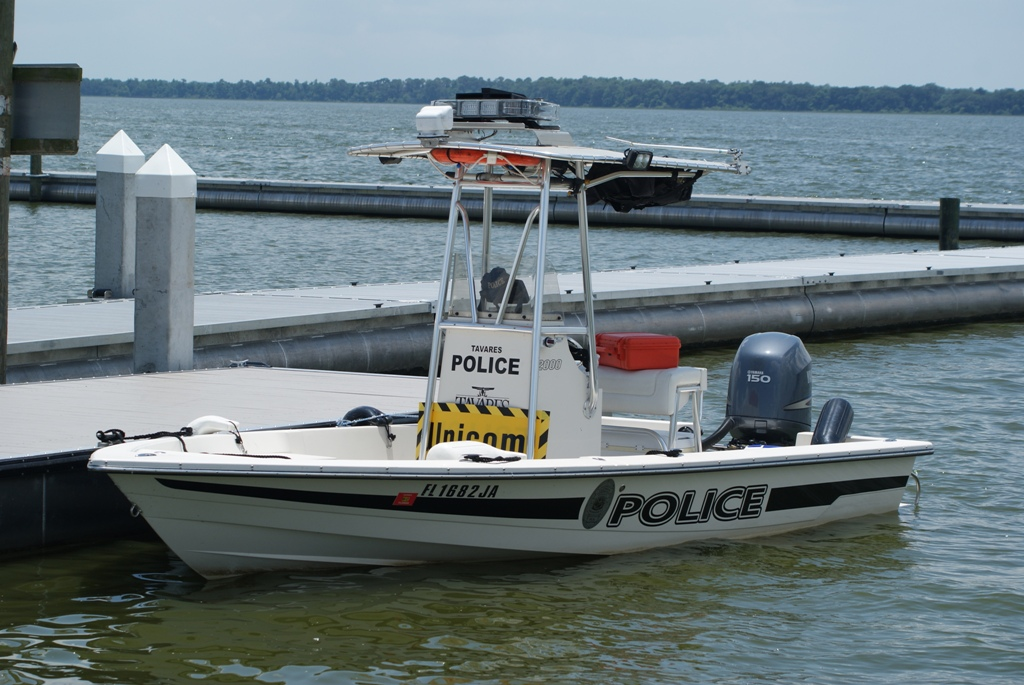
Police boat
