= Lake Dexter (Polk County, Florida) =

- Location within Florida Location within the United States
- Location: Winter Haven, Florida
- Coordinates: 27.9906°N 81.6812°W
- Type: natural freshwater lake
- Basin countries: United States
- Max. length: 4,135 feet (1,260 m)
- Max. width: 2,275 feet (693 m)
- Surface area: 166 acres (67 ha)
- Average depth: 5 feet (1.5 m)
- Max. depth: 18 feet (5.5 m)
- Surface elevation: 135 feet (41 m)

Lake Dexter, which is somewhat apostrophe shaped, is a natural freshwater lake in southeast Winter Haven, Florida. This lake has a 166-acre (670,000 m^{2}) surface area. It is bounded on the south by a hotel, on the southeast by an apartment complex, on the east and northeast by residences, on the north by commercial property, on the northwest by residences and on the west by a Legoland resort. Parts of the shore around the lake are lined by swampy areas.

Possibly the south and southeast shores of Lake Dexter border on publicly owned land. If this is public land, it is the only place the public could fish from the shore. At any rate the lake has only boat access from private boat ramps and docks and it has no public swimming areas. The Hook and Bullet website says Lake Dexter contains largemouth bass, bluegill and crappie.

== LEGOLAND Beach Retreat ==
LEGOLAND announced on March 15, 2016, that they would build a village-style, lakefront resort that will feature 83 single-story duplex units, offering 166 separate accommodations that sleep up to five. This addition opened mid 2017. The property, located on the western shore of Lake Dexter, is bordered by Register Road, which extends east from Legoland's main entrance and splits into a north–south road running behind Winter Haven Square.
