= Alexander St. Clair Abrams =

American attorney, politician, and writer

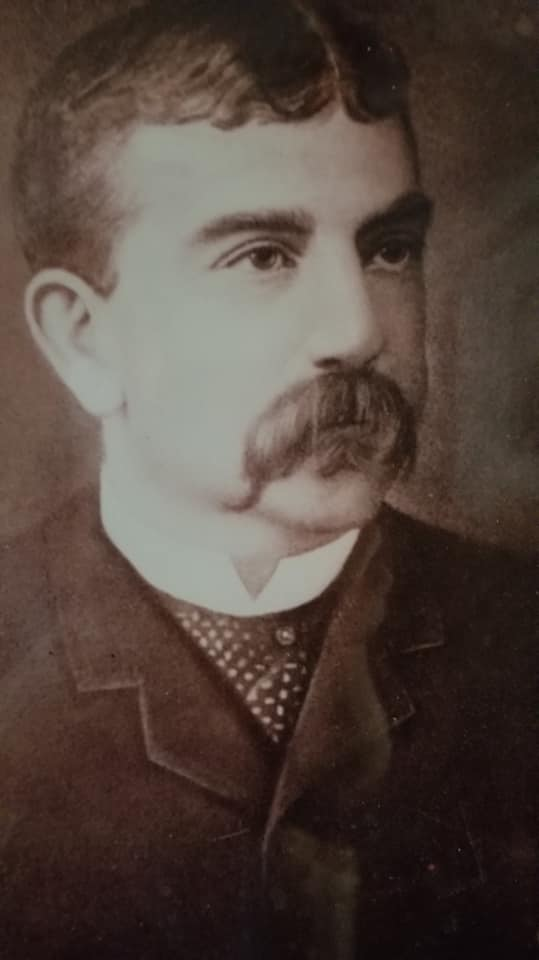
Photo of Alexander St. Clair Abrams

Major Alexander St. Clair Abrams (March 10, 1845- June 5, 1931) was an American attorney, politician, and writer. He was born in New Orleans in 1845 and moved to Florida in 1875. He was a prominent attorney in Orlando. He fought in the Confederate Army beginning in 1861 and later wrote A full and detailed history of the siege of Vicksburg. In 1880, Abrams founded the city of Tavares, Florida. He envisioned that Tavares would become the state capital until a fire destroyed the majority of the downtown. In 1887, he aided in the introduction of the bill which would establish Lake County, Florida. He died in Jacksonville, Florida, on June 5, 1931.
