= National Register of Historic Places listings in Lake County, Florida =

Location of Lake County in Florida

This is a list of the National Register of Historic Places listings in Lake County, Florida.

This is intended to be a complete list of the properties and districts on the National Register of Historic Places in Lake County, Florida, United States. The locations of National Register properties and districts for which the latitude and longitude coordinates are included below, may be seen in a map.

There are 32 properties and districts listed on the National Register in the county. Two properties were once listed, by have since been delisted.

This National Park Service list is complete through NPS recent listings posted April 4, 2025.

Contents: Counties in Florida (non-linked contain no National Register listings)
Alachua - Baker - Bay - Bradford - Brevard - Broward - Calhoun - Charlotte - Citrus - Clay - Collier - Columbia - DeSoto - Dixie - Duval - Escambia - Flagler - Franklin - Gadsden - Gilchrist - Glades - Gulf - Hamilton - Hardee - Hendry - Hernando - Highlands - Hillsborough (Tampa) - Holmes - Indian River - Jackson - Jefferson - Lafayette - Lake - Lee - Leon - Levy - Liberty - Madison - Manatee - Marion - Martin - Miami-Dade (Miami) - Monroe - Nassau - Okaloosa - Okeechobee - Orange - Osceola - Palm Beach - Pasco - Pinellas - Polk - Putnam - St. Johns - St. Lucie - Santa Rosa - Sarasota - Seminole - Sumter - Suwannee - Taylor - Union - Volusia - Wakulla - Walton - Washington

== Current listings ==
	Name on the Register	Image	Date listed	Location	City or town	Description
1	Blandford	Blandford	November 1, 2007 (#07001115)	28242 Lake Terry Drive; 28°45′31″N 81°40′14″W	Mount Dora	
2	Bowers Bluff Middens Archeological District	Bowers Bluff Middens Archeological District	February 1, 1980 (#80000952)	Address Restricted	Astor	
3	Campbell House	Campbell House	November 12, 1999 (#99001298)	3147 County Road 470; 28°44′51″N 81°54′04″W	Okahumpka	
4	Clermont Woman's Club	Clermont Woman's Club	January 7, 1993 (#92001747)	655 Broome Street; 28°33′06″N 81°45′59″W	Clermont	
5	Clifford House	Clifford House	April 4, 1975 (#75000559)	536 North Bay Street; 28°51′28″N 81°41′11″W	Eustis	
6	Donnelly House	Donnelly House	April 4, 1975 (#75000560)	Donnelly Avenue; 28°48′02″N 81°38′42″W	Mount Dora	
7	Harry C. Duncan House	Harry C. Duncan House	August 8, 1997 (#97000860)	426 Lake Dora Drive; 28°48′04″N 81°43′22″W	Tavares	
8	Dyches House	Dyches House	September 8, 2014 (#14000552)	240 E. Lady Lake Blvd. 28°54′57″N 81°54′57″W	Lady Lake	
9	Edge House	Edge House	October 5, 2006 (#06000917)	1218 West Broad Street; 28°33′54″N 81°52′15″W	Groveland	
10	Eustis Commercial Historic District	Eustis Commercial Historic District	July 6, 2005 (#05000654)	Roughly Lake Eustis, McDonald Avenue, Grove Street, and Orange Avenue; 28°51′13″N 81°41′07″W	Eustis	
11	Ferran Park and the Alice McClelland Memorial Bandshell	Ferran Park and the Alice McClelland Memorial Bandshell	June 23, 1994 (#94000625)	Junction of Ferran Park Road and Orange Avenue; 28°51′14″N 81°41′12″W	Eustis	
12	Edgar L. Ferran House	Edgar L. Ferran House	October 16, 2019 (#100004518)	310 E. Orange Ave. 28°51′10″N 81°40′56″W	Eustis	
13	Harper House	Harper House	September 15, 2004 (#04000969)	17408 East Porter Avenue; 28°35′55″N 81°40′04″W	Montverde	
14	Hill Crest	Hill Crest	November 12, 2015 (#15000783)	511 E. Mirror Lake Dr. 28°51′07″N 81°54′36″W	Fruitland Park	
15	Holy Trinity Episcopal Church	Holy Trinity Episcopal Church	December 27, 1974 (#74000646)	Spring Lake Road; 28°52′38″N 81°55′01″W	Fruitland Park	
16	Howey House	Howey House	January 27, 1983 (#83001426)	Citrus Street; 28°43′22″N 81°46′30″W	Howey-in-the-Hills	
17	Kimball Island Midden Archeological Site	Kimball Island Midden Archeological Site	December 11, 1979 (#79000675)	Address Restricted	Astor	
18	Lake County Courthouse	Lake County Courthouse	September 25, 1998 (#98001199)	315 West Main Street; 28°48′06″N 81°43′52″W	Tavares	
19	Lakeside Inn	Lakeside Inn	March 19, 1987 (#87000481)	100 North Alexander Street; 28°47′52″N 81°38′42″W	Mount Dora	
20	LaRoe Family Homestead Historic District	LaRoe Family Homestead Historic District	June 29, 2009 (#09000493)	3430 West County Road 44 and 2891 East Orange Avenue; 28°51′14″N 81°39′15″W	Eustis	
21	Methodist Episcopal Church, South, at Umatilla	Methodist Episcopal Church, South, at Umatilla	January 27, 2000 (#99001707)	100 West Guerrant Street; 28°55′39″N 81°40′17″W	Umatilla	
22	Mote-Morris House	Mote-Morris House	December 27, 1974 (#74000647)	1021 North Main Street; 28°48′38″N 81°53′02″W	Leesburg	
23	Mount Dora Historic District	Mount Dora Historic District	October 1, 2009 (#09000777)	Roughly 3rd Avenue, 11th Avenue, Clayton Street, and Helen Street; 28°48′09″N 81°38′37″W	Mount Dora	
24	Gould Hyde Norton House	Gould Hyde Norton House	May 16, 1997 (#97000433)	1390 East Lakeview Drive; 28°50′28″N 81°40′18″W	Eustis	
25	Okahumpka Rosenwald School		January 18, 2022 (#100007365)	27908 Virgil Hawkins Circle; 28°45′01″N 81°53′42″W	Okahumpka	
26	Old Mount Dora Atlantic Coast Line Railroad Station	Old Mount Dora Atlantic Coast Line Railroad Station	March 5, 1992 (#92000099)	341 Alexander Street; 28°47′57″N 81°38′46″W	Mount Dora	
27	William Kimbrough Pendleton House	William Kimbrough Pendleton House	January 13, 1983 (#83001427)	1208 Chesterfield Road; 28°50′26″N 81°40′35″W	Eustis	
28	Purdy Villa	Purdy Villa	March 10, 2004 (#04000143)	3045 Eudora Road; 28°49′26″N 81°40′26″W	Eustis	
29	William Alfred Suggs Veterans of Foreign Wars Post 5277		March 18, 2021 (#100005386)	855 West Desoto St. 28°33′15″N 81°46′10″W	Clermont	
30	Moses J. Taylor House	Moses J. Taylor House	August 1, 1997 (#97000840)	117 Diedrich Street; 28°51′02″N 81°40′20″W	Eustis	
31	Witherspoon Lodge No. 111 Free and Accepted Masons (F&AM)	Witherspoon Lodge No. 111 Free and Accepted Masons (F&AM)	May 21, 2009 (#09000346)	1410 North Clayton Street; 28°48′32″N 81°38′19″W	Mount Dora	
32	Woman's Club of Eustis	Woman's Club of Eustis	August 5, 1991 (#91001006)	227 North Center Street; 28°51′15″N 81°40′52″W	Eustis	

== Former listing ==
	Name on the Register	Image	Date listed	Date removed	Location	City or town	Description
1	Fruitland Park Community Center	Fruitland Park Community Center	July 24, 2015 (#15000508)	July 24, 2018	604 W. Berckman St. 28°51′30″N 81°54′50″W	Fruitland Park	
2	Lee School	Lee School	February 17, 1995 (#95000024)	April 4, 2025	207 North Lee Street; 28°48′46″N 81°52′53″W	Leesburg	

== See also ==
- List of National Historic Landmarks in Florida
- National Register of Historic Places listings in Florida
