= Blandford (disambiguation) =

Blandford, officially known as Blandford Forum is a small historic market town in the English county of Dorset, United Kingdom. Blandford may also refer to:

== Places called Blandford ==
- Blandford, Massachusetts, United States, a New England town
  - Blandford (CDP), Massachusetts, the main village in the town
- Blandford, New South Wales, Australia
- Blandford, Ontario, Canada
- Blandford-Blenheim, a township in Ontario
- Blandford, Nova Scotia, Canada
- Blandford, Virginia (former town annexed by Petersburg, Virginia), United States
- Blandford (Mount Dora, Florida), a historic building
- Port Blandford, a town in eastern Newfoundland, Newfoundland and Labrador, Canada

== Other places ==
- Blandford (ward), electoral division covering Blandford Forum
- Blandford Camp, a military base lying 2 miles (3 km) north-east of Blandford Forum
- Blandford Cemetery, located in Petersburg, Virginia, USA. The oldest stone, marking the grave of Richard Yarbrough, reads 1702. Veterans of six wars are buried there

== Titles ==
- Marquess of Blandford, a subsidiary title of the Duke of Marlborough

== Other ==
- Battle of Blandford, at Blandford, Virginia, during the American Revolutionary War
- Blandford (surname)
- Blandford (horse), Irish Champion Thoroughbred sire
- Blandford (soil), a loam or sandy loam soil which has developed on glacial till in parts of southern Quebec and northern New England
- Blandford Stakes, a Group 2 flat horse race in Ireland which is open to thoroughbred fillies and mares aged three years or older

== See also ==
- Blanford (disambiguation)
