= Campbell House (Okahumpka, Florida) =

Historic house in Florida, United States

- U.S. National Register of Historic Places
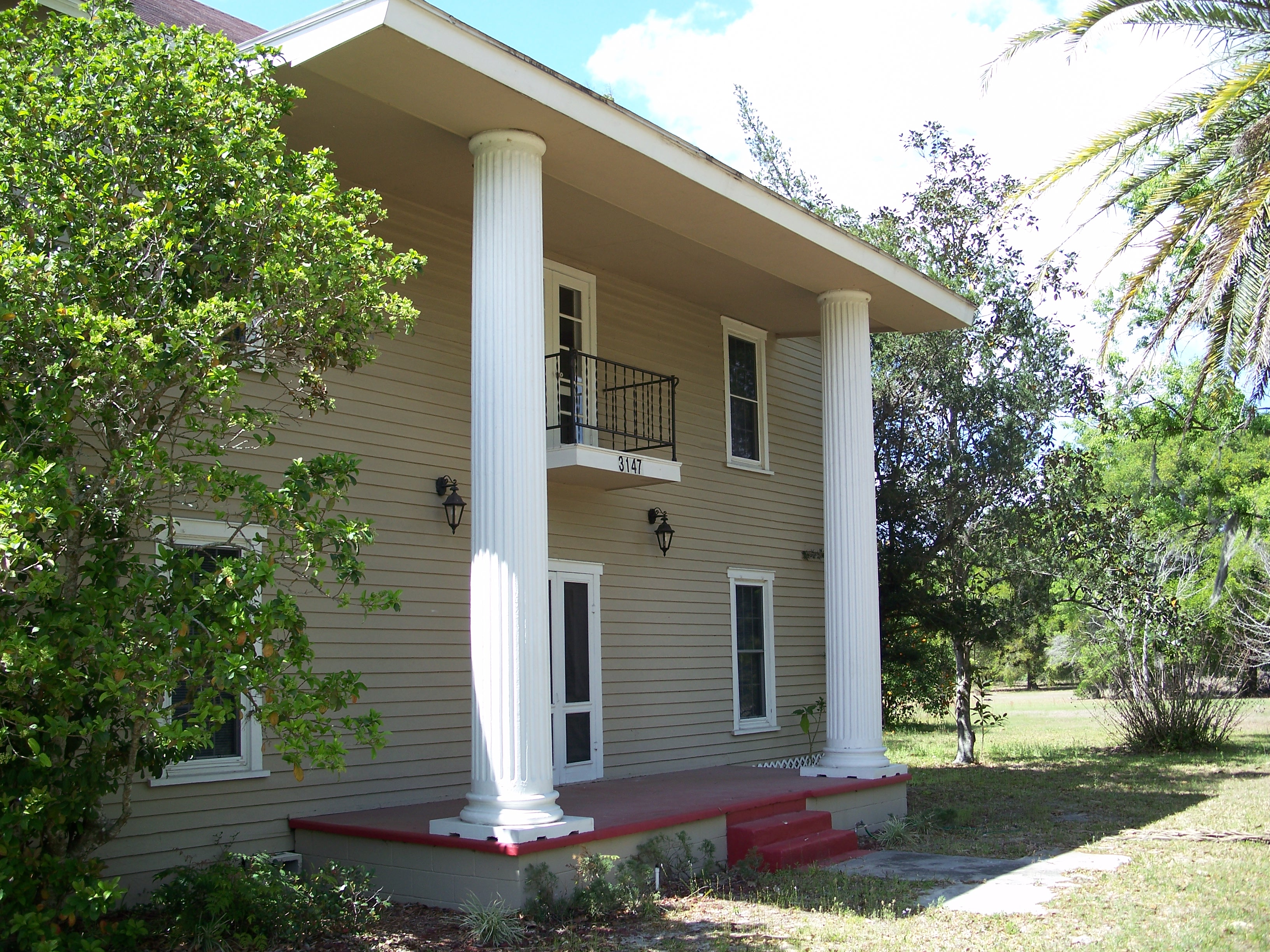

- Location within Florida Location within the United States
- Location: Okahumpka, Florida
- Coordinates: 28°44′51″N 81°54′4″W
- Built: c. 1880
- Architectural style: Frame Vernacular
- NRHP reference No.: 99001298
- Added to NRHP: 12 November 1999

The Campbell House, also known as the Valentine House), is a historic house at 3147 County Road 470 in Okahumpka, Florida. It is locally significant as an excellent example of a frame vernacular house, and one of the few houses built in the 19th century Okahumpka. The home contains a historical marker to Virgil D. Hawkins, a civil rights activist born and raised in the area.

== Description and history ==
It is a two-story frame vernacular house with an L-shaped footprint and a one-story addition on the side. The main block is in an I-house form, one room deep with a central staircase. The two-story gable extension on the rear contains the kitchen and work area. A majority of the windows are 6/6 double-hung vinyl sashes which were designed replicate the historic wooden windows.

It was added to the National Register of Historic Places on November 12, 1999.
