= Blanford =

Blanford may refer to:

== Places ==
- Blanford, Indiana, United States
- Blanford, Virginia (former town annexed by Petersburg, Virginia), United States

== People with the surname ==
- Henry Francis Blanford (1834–1893), British meteorologist and palaeontologist
- William Thomas Blanford (1832–1905), English geologist and naturalist

== See also ==
- Battle of Blanford, a British victory during the American War of Independence
- Blandford (disambiguation)
