= Okahumpka, Florida =

- Census-designated place
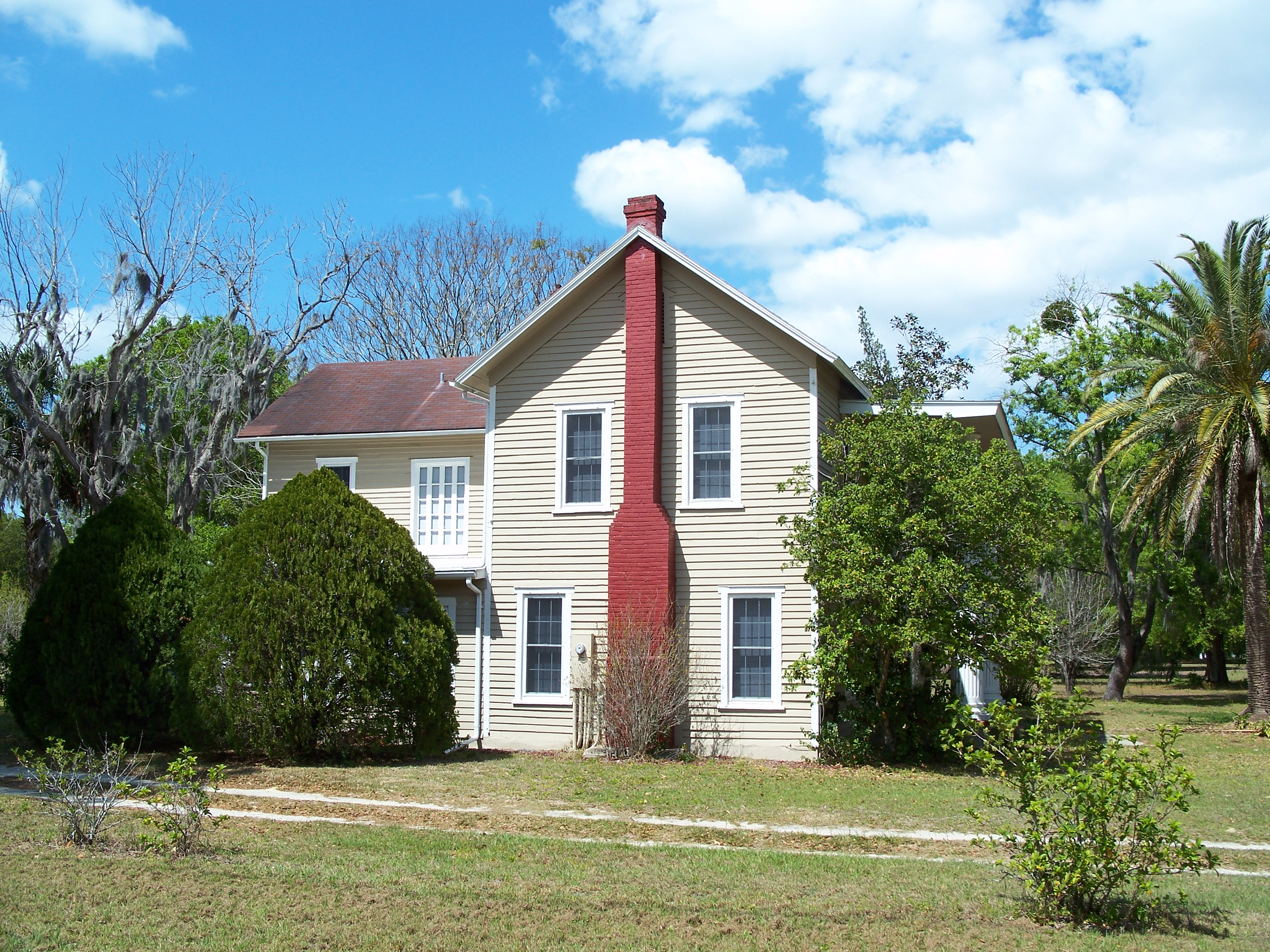
- Historic Campbell House

- Location in Lake County and the state of Florida
- Coordinates: 28°44′45″N 81°53′46″W
- Country: United States
- State: Florida
- County: Lake

Area
  - Total: 0.25 sq mi (0.64 km^{2})
  - Land: 0.25 sq mi (0.64 km^{2})
  - Water: 0 sq mi (0.00 km^{2})
- Elevation: 92 ft (28 m)

Population (2020)
  - Total: 240
  - Density: 973.6/sq mi (375.91/km^{2})
- Time zone: UTC-5 (Eastern (EST))
  - Summer (DST): UTC-4 (EDT)
- ZIP code: 34762
- Area code: 352
- FIPS code: 12-51150
- GNIS feature ID: 2403372

Okahumpka is an unincorporated community and census-designated place (CDP) in Lake County, Florida, United States. As of the 2020 census, Okahumpka had a population of 240. It is part of the Orlando–Kissimmee Metropolitan Statistical Area.

It is the location of the Historic Campbell House, listed on the National Register of Historic Places.

== Geography ==
Okahumpka is located in western Lake County. County Road 33 passes through the community, leading northeast 1.5 miles (2.4 km) to U.S. Route 27, which leads 3 miles (5 km) farther north to Leesburg; and south 12 miles (19 km) to Mascotte. County Road 48 leads east 1 mile (1.6 km) to US-27 and southwest 9 miles (14 km) to Center Hill. County Road 470 leads west 3 miles (5 km) to an interchange with Florida's Turnpike.

According to the United States Census Bureau, the Okahumpka CDP has a total area of 0.25 square miles (0.64 km^{2}), all land.

== Demographics ==
Historical population
Census	Pop.	Note	%±
2020	240		—
U.S. Decennial Census

As of the census of 2000, there were 251 people, 108 households, and 72 families residing in the CDP. The population density was 1,049.1 inhabitants per square mile (405.1/km^{2}). There were 113 housing units at an average density of 472.3 per square mile (182.4/km^{2}). The racial makeup of the CDP was 98.80% White, 0.80% African American, 0.40% from other races. Hispanic or Latino of any race were 0.80% of the population.

There were 108 households, out of which 26.9% had children under the age of 18 living with them, 45.4% were married couples living together, 14.8% had a female householder with no husband present, and 33.3% were non-families. 25.9% of all households were made up of individuals, and 7.4% had someone living alone who was 65 years of age or older. The average household size was 2.32 and the average family size was 2.74.

In the CDP, the population was spread out, with 18.7% under the age of 18, 9.6% from 18 to 24, 29.9% from 25 to 44, 30.3% from 45 to 64, and 11.6% who were 65 years of age or older. The median age was 40 years. For every 100 females, there were 105.7 males. For every 100 females age 18 and over, there were 106.1 males.

The median income for a household in the CDP was $19,219, and the median income for a family was $50,268. Males had a median income of $25,313 versus $20,179 for females. The per capita income for the CDP was $12,684. About 17.5% of families and 31.4% of the population were below the poverty line, including 74.4% of those under the age of 18 and 29.6% of those 65 or over.

== Notable people ==
- Virgil D. Hawkins (1906–1988), civil rights attorney, born in Okahumpka
