= Gould Hyde Norton House =

Historic house in Florida, United States

- U.S. National Register of Historic Places
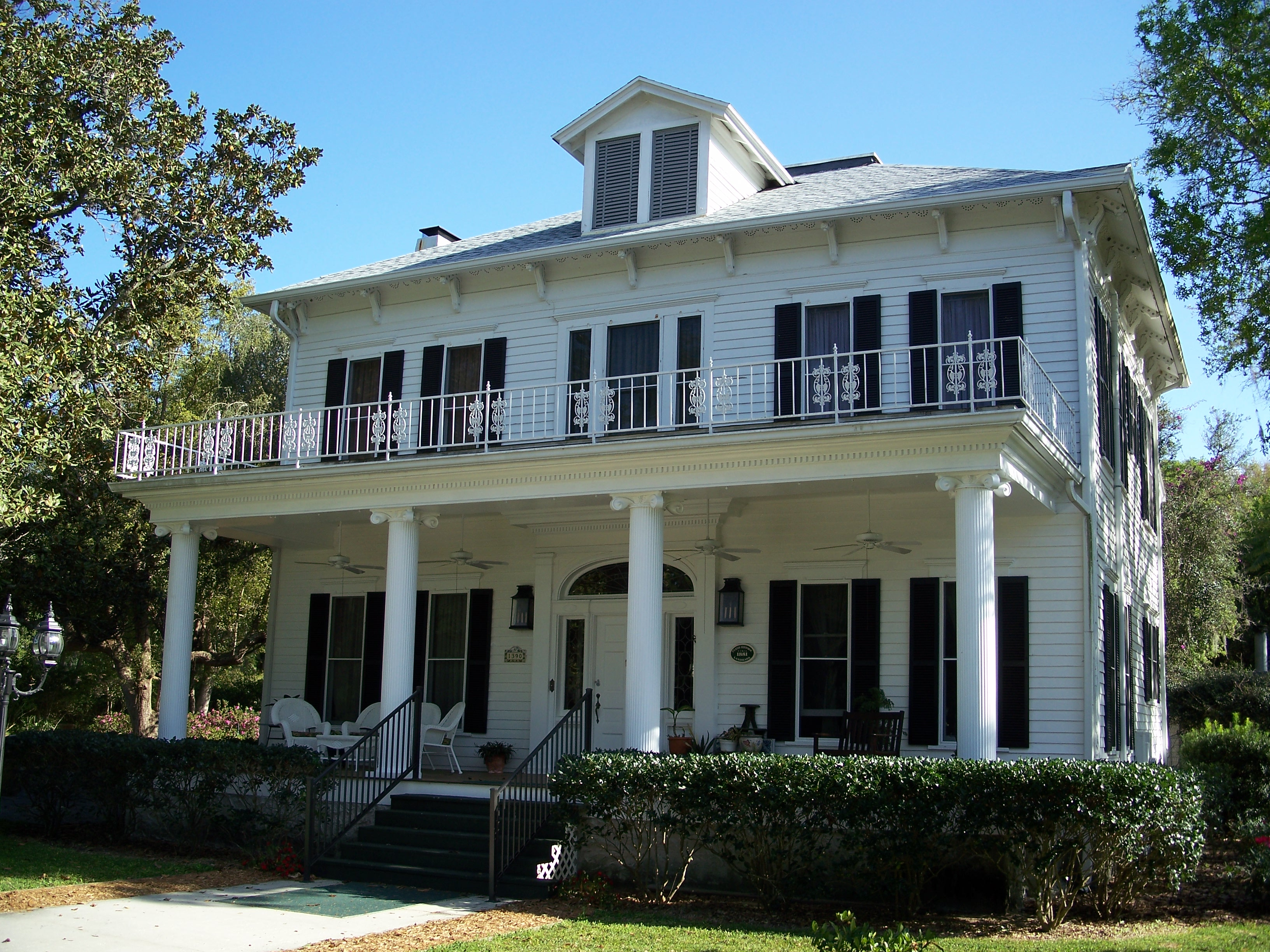

- Location within Florida Location within the United States
- Location: Eustis, Florida
- Coordinates: 28°50′28″N 81°40′18″W
- Architectural style: Italianate
- NRHP reference No.: 97000433
- Added to NRHP: May 16, 1997

The Gould Hyde Norton House is a historic home in Eustis, Florida, United States. It is located at 1390 East Lakeview Drive. On May 16, 1997, it was added to the U.S. National Register of Historic Places.
