= Blandford (surname) =

Blandford is a surname. Notable people with the surname include:

- Don Blandford, longtime Kentucky state legislator
- George Fielding Blandford (1829–1911), English physician and psychiatrist
- Mark Blandford (entrepreneur) (born 1957), British entrepreneur
- Mark Harden Blandford (1826–1902), American soldier, attorney, politician and judge
- Roger Blandford (born 1949), astronomer and astrophysicist
- Walter F. H. Blandford, entomologist
