= Blandford (soil) =

Blandford soil series is the name given to a loam or sandy loam soil which has developed on glacial till in parts of southern Quebec and northern New England. It belongs to the brown podzolic soil group and occurs in hilly areas of the Green Mountains in Vermont plus the adjoining Sutton Mountains in Quebec. In recent years, the USDA has deactivated this series, which remains on active status in Canada.

Similar soils on active status in Vermont include the Stowe series and the Woodstock series.

== Geology ==
Metamorphic and sedimentary rock underlie the parent material of the Blandford series. Slate, phyllite and sandstone are most common. These rocks have low to moderate amounts of mineral nutrients but provide enough fine-grained material to form a loamy soil.

== Agriculture ==
This series is one of the better soils for agriculture in its area of occurrence, even though it tends to be acidic and stony. Mixed farming is practiced in those areas still under cultivation with corn, oats and potatoes among the crops. There also are some apple and grape orchards. Many areas, however, have long since reverted to forest. Sugar maple is often dominant and exploited in sugar bushes.
