= Witherspoon Lodge of Free and Accepted Masons, No. 111 =

- Witherspoon Lodge No. 111 Free and Accepted Masons (F&AM)
- U.S. National Register of Historic Places
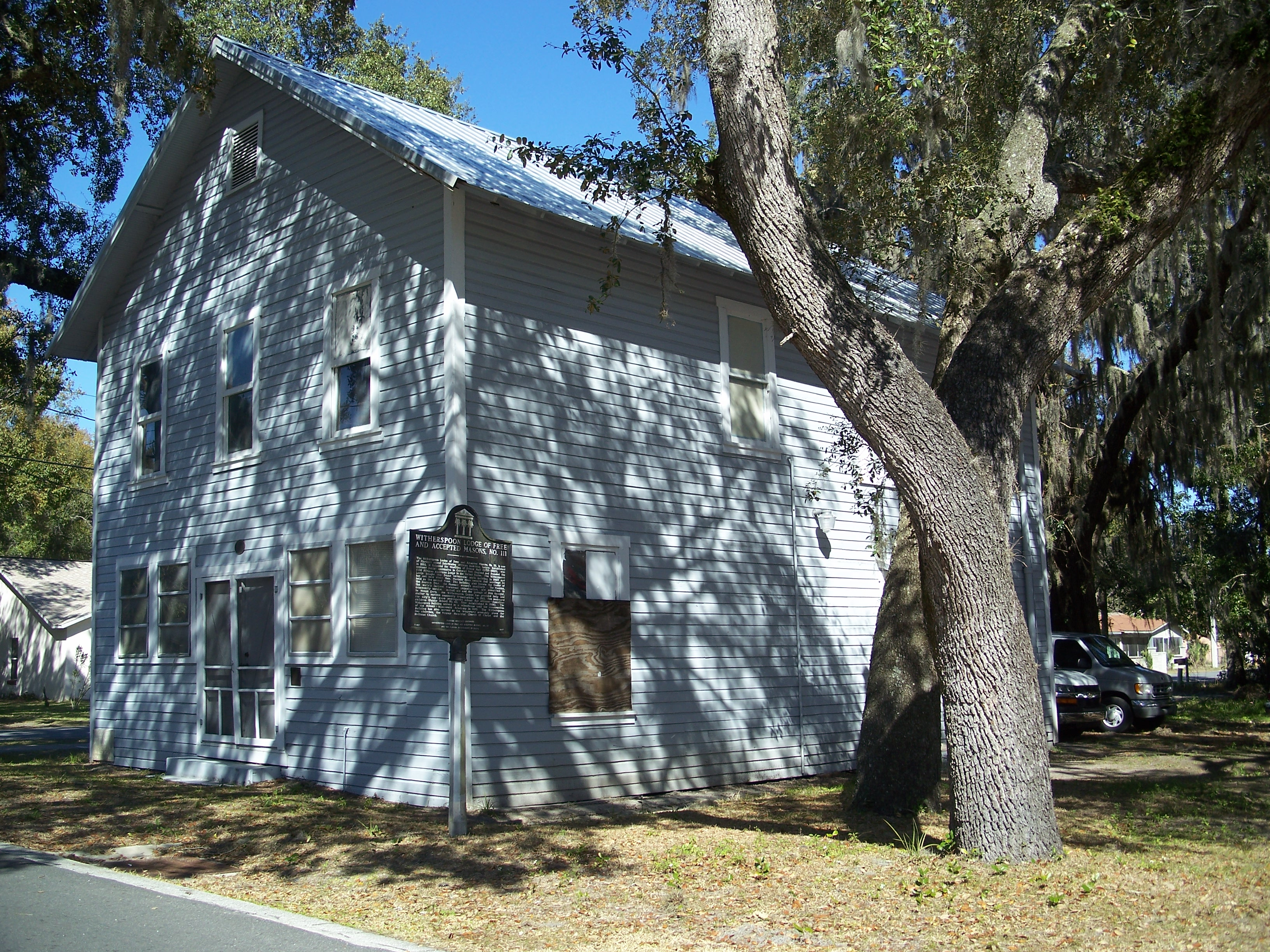

- Location within Florida Location within the United States
- Location: Mount Dora, Florida, U.S.
- Coordinates: 28°48′32″N 81°38′19″W
- Built: c.1921
- Architectural style: Frame Vernacular
- NRHP reference No.: 09000346
- Added to NRHP: May 21, 2009

Witherspoon Lodge No. 111 Free and Accepted Masons (F&AM) is a historic building located is at 1410 North Clayton Street in Mount Dora, Florida, United States. The building was added to the U.S. National Register of Historic Places in 2009.

The building is named for Witherspoon Lodge, a Prince Hall tradition Masonic lodge chartered by the Union Grand Lodge of Florida, which purchased the building in 1903. The building served as a meeting place for the lodge for many years, but as of 2013 the lodge is listed as inactive.

The building also served as a school for African-American children from 1922 to 1925.

It was built around 1921.

== Gallery ==
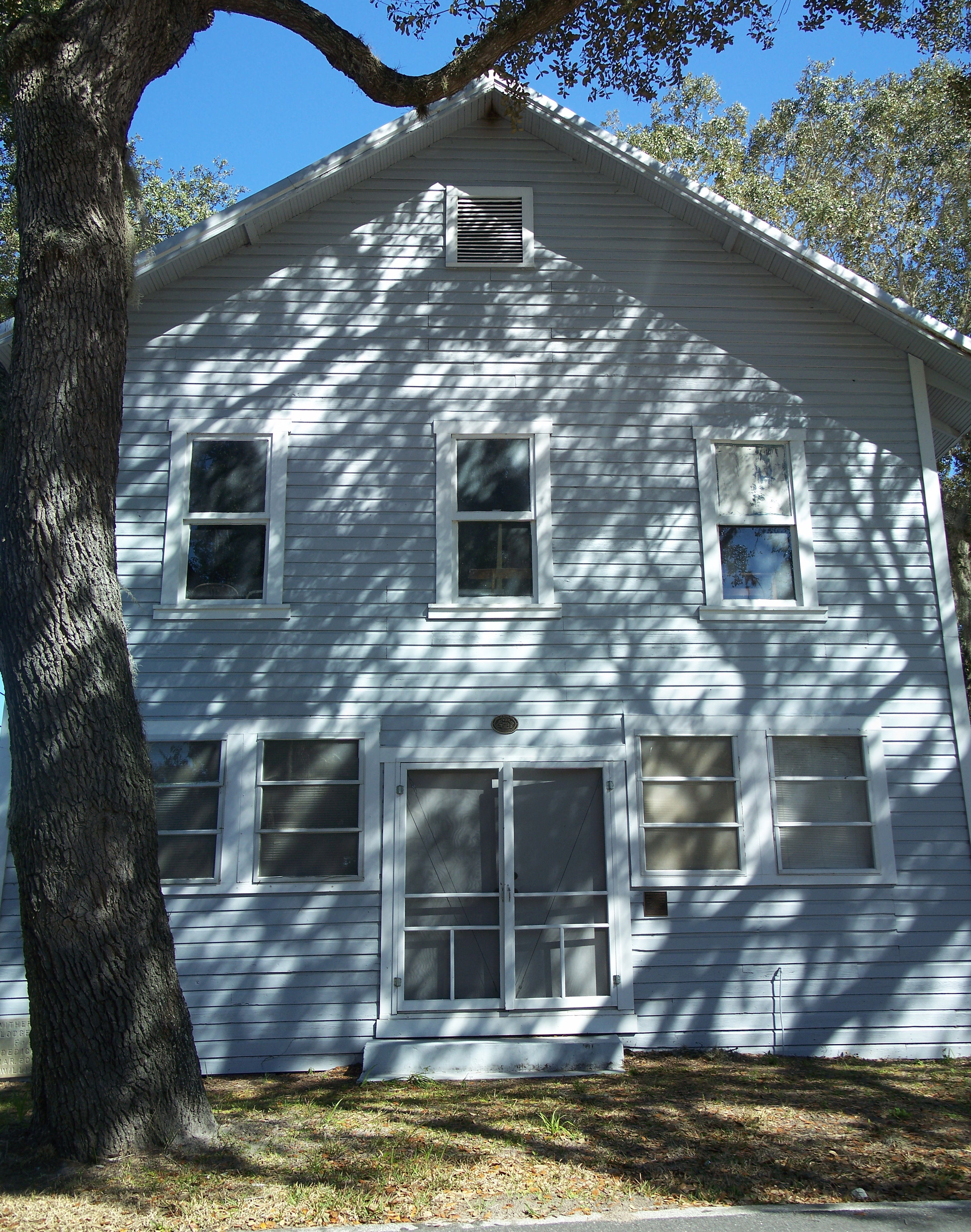

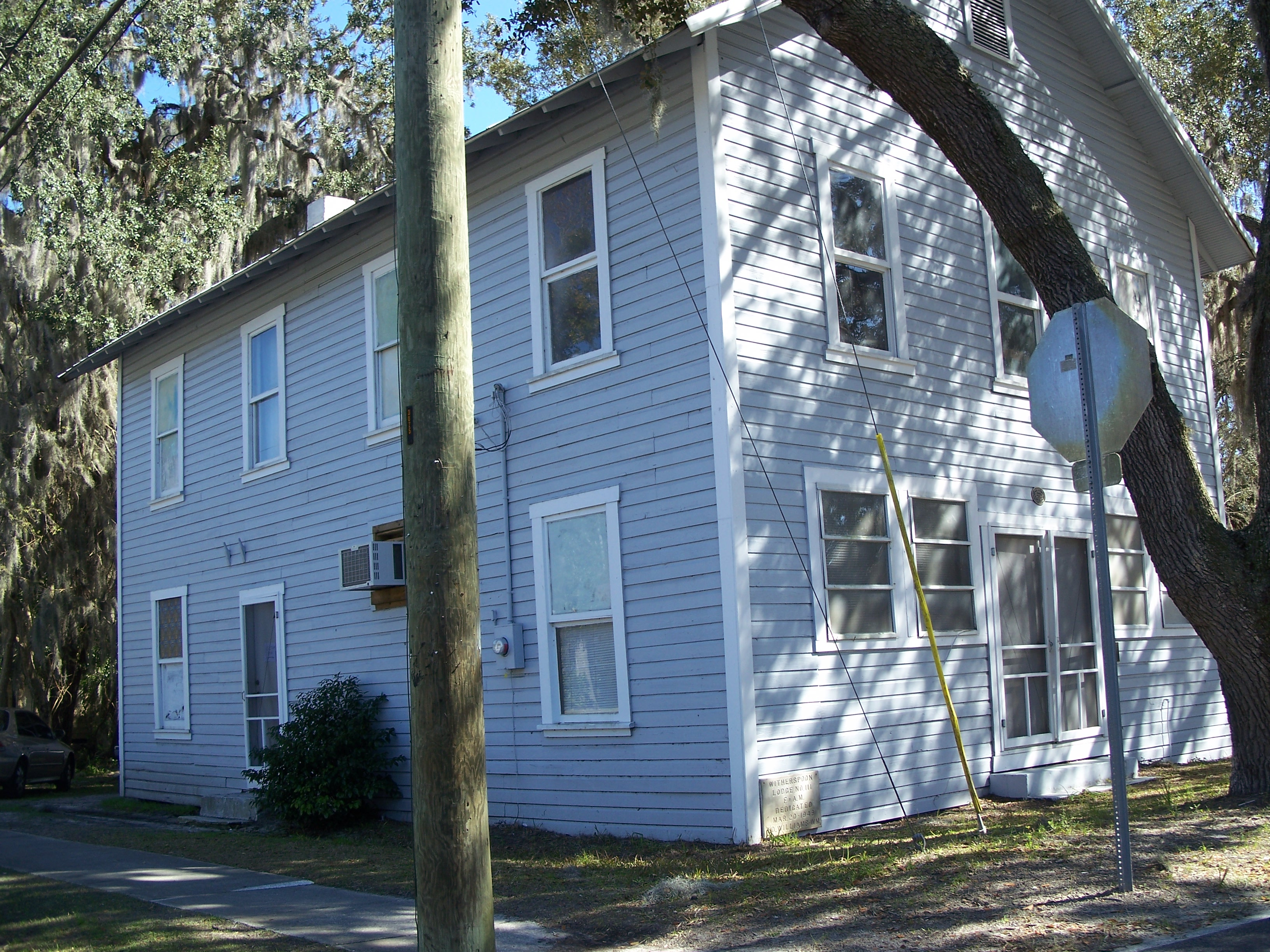

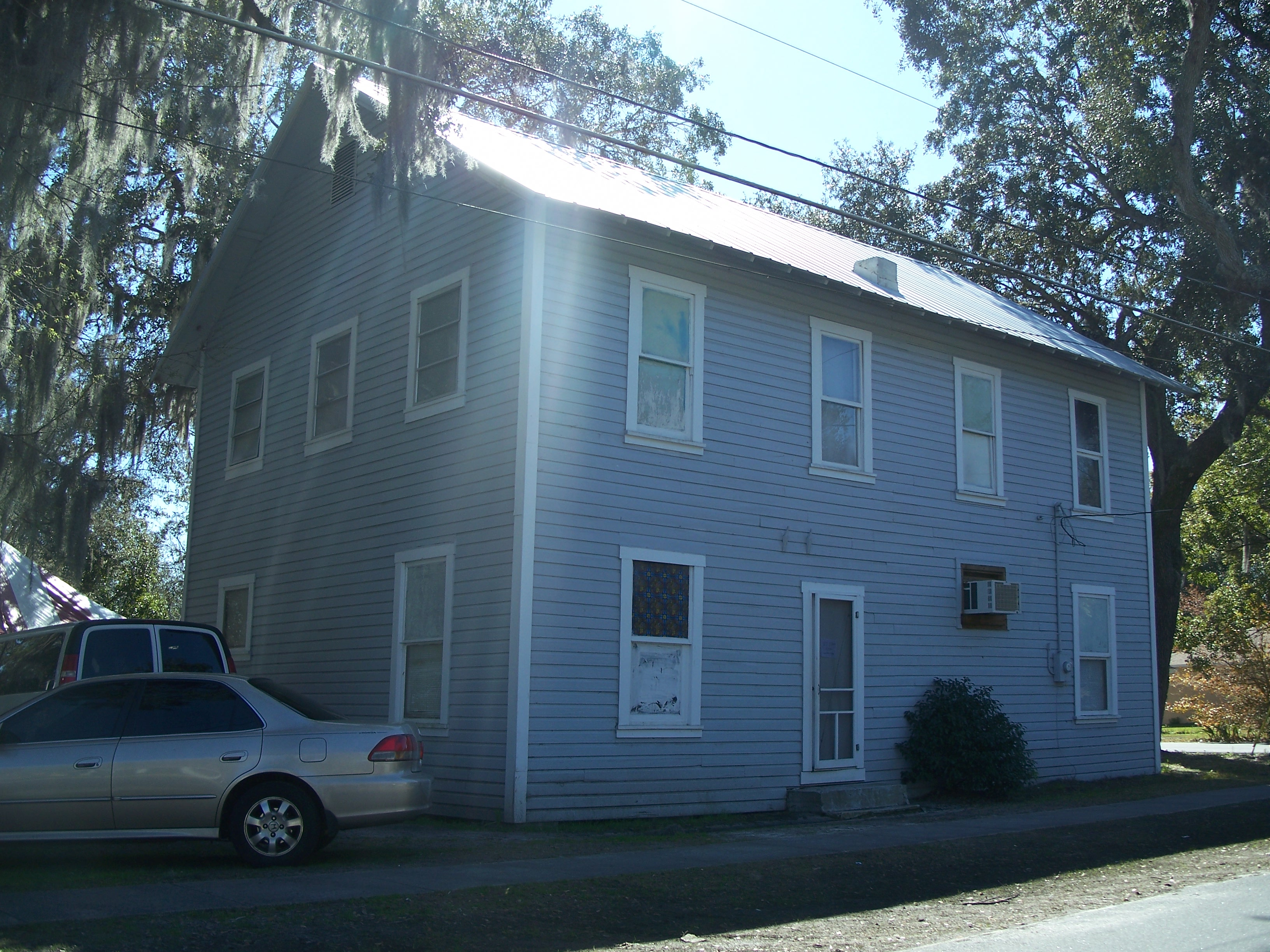
