= LaRoe Family Homestead Historic District =

Historic district in Florida, United States

- U.S. National Register of Historic Places
- U.S. Historic district
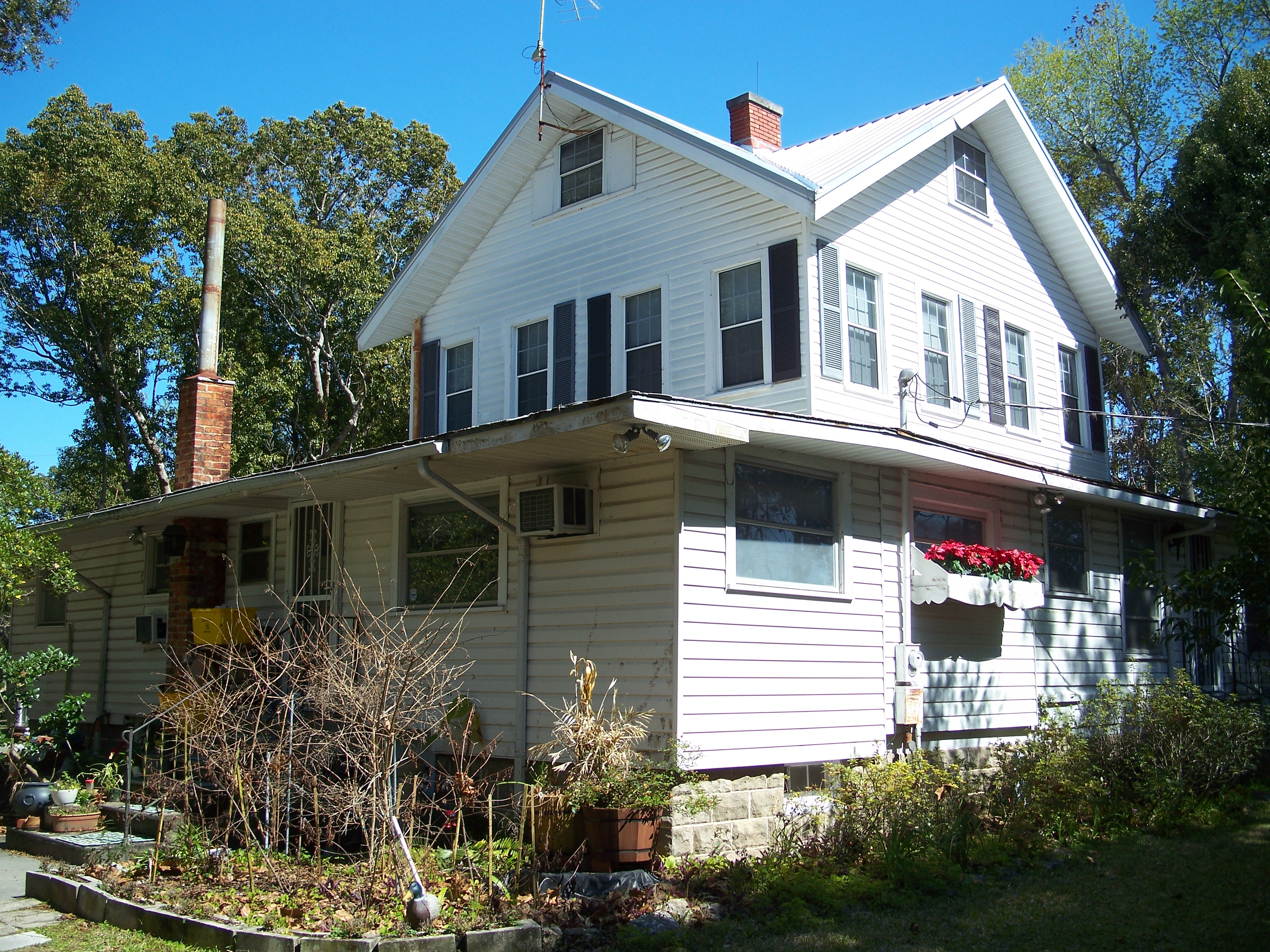

- Location within Florida Location within the United States
- Location: Eustis, Florida
- Coordinates: 28°51′11″N 81°39′13″W
- Area: 5 acres (20,000 m^{2})
- Built: 1880-1949
- Architect: Albert Brown
- Architectural style: Late 19th and 20th Century Revival/Colonial Revival
- NRHP reference No.: 09000493
- Added to NRHP: June 29, 2009

LaRoe Family Homestead Historic District is a historic district in Eustis, Florida, near the corner of West County Road 44 and East Orange Avenue. It consists of a complex of buildings, nine of which (constructed between 1880 and 1949) are contributing properties to the district. They include the primary residence and various farm buildings. The architecture in the district is a combination of Late 19th and 20th Century Revival and Colonial Revival. The district was listed on the National Register of Historic Places on June 29, 2009.

The property was added to the National Register of Historic Places (NRHP) on June 29, 2009, and the listing was announced as the featured listing in the National Park Service's weekly list of July 19, 2009.
