= Purdy Villa =

Historic house in Florida, United States

- U.S. National Register of Historic Places
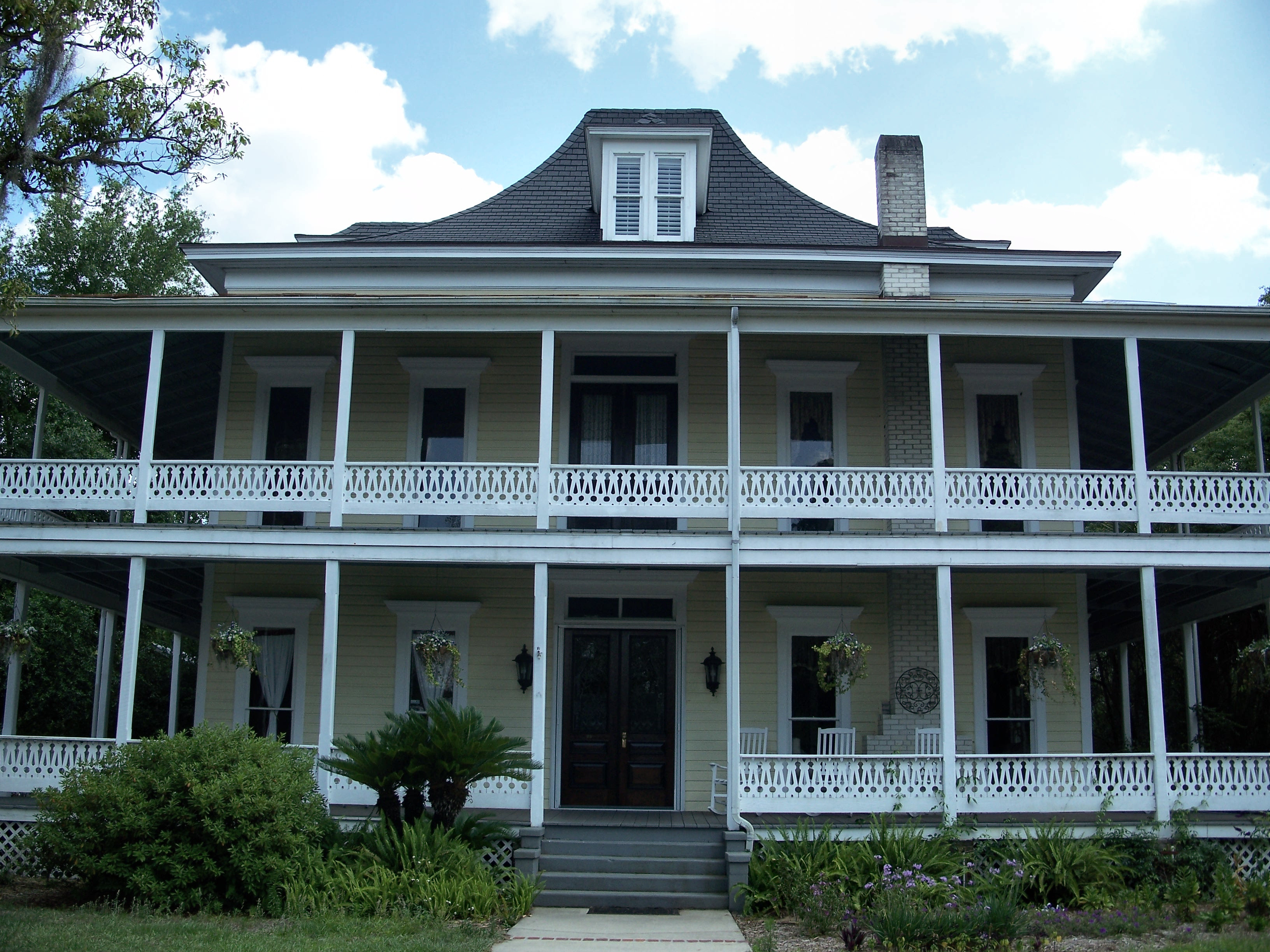

- Location within Florida Location within the United States
- Location: Eustis, Florida, USA
- Coordinates: 28°49′26″N 81°40′26″W
- NRHP reference No.: 04000143
- Added to NRHP: March 10, 2004

The Purdy Villa is a historic U.S. home in Eustis, Florida. It is located at 3045 Eudora Road. On March 10, 2004, it was added to the U.S. National Register of Historic Places.
