= Virgil D. Hawkins =

American lawyer (1906–1988)

Virgil Darnell Hawkins
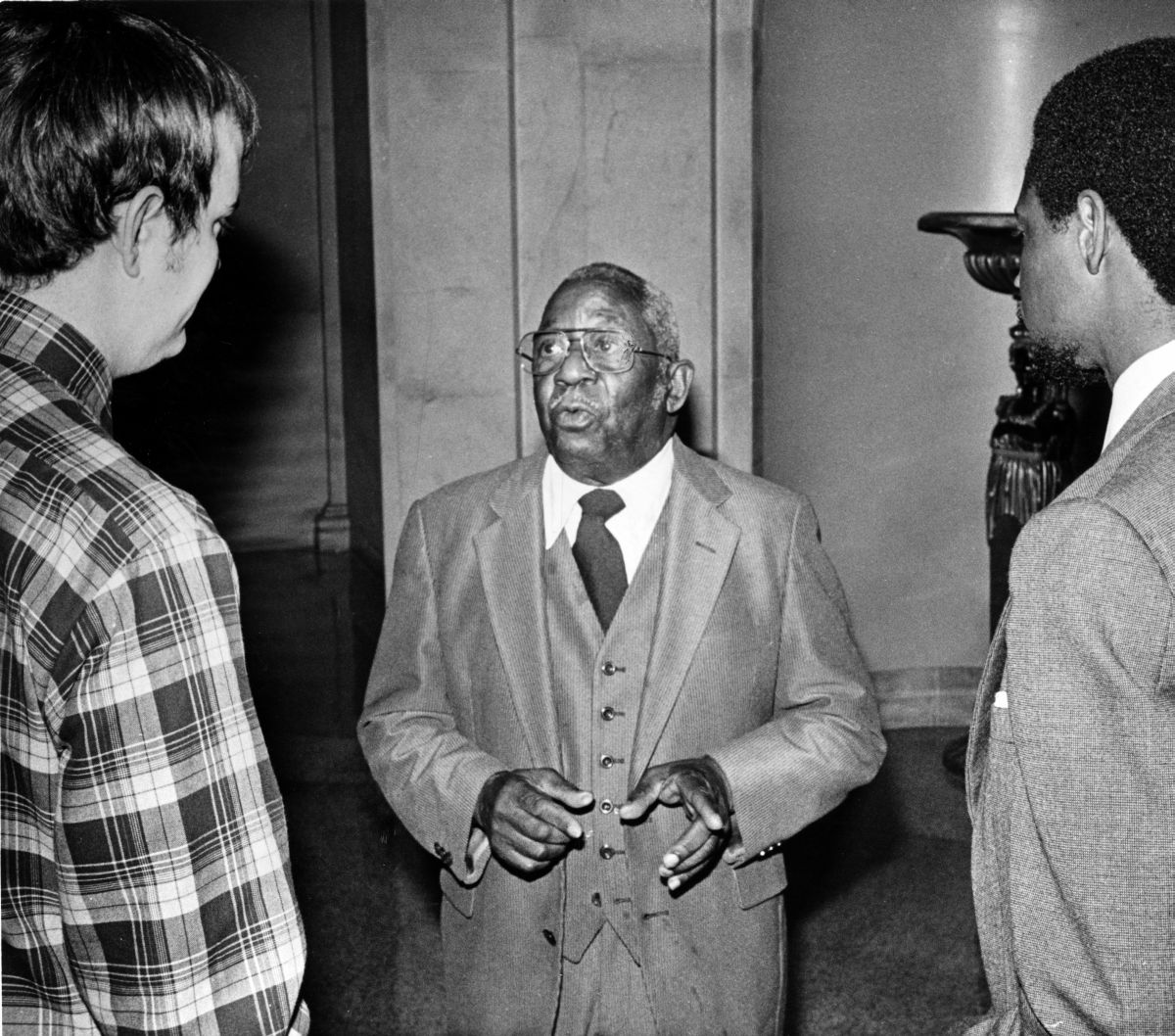
- Hawkins in 1983
- Born: November 28, 1906; Okahumpka, Florida
- Died: February 11, 1988 (aged 81)
- Education: New England Law Boston
- Occupation: Lawyer
- Spouse: Ida B. Hawkins

Virgil Darnell Hawkins (November 28, 1906 – February 11, 1988) was an African-American educator and Florida attorney who spent several decades of his life fighting for admission to practice law in Florida after having initially been denied admission to the University of Florida School of Law on the basis of his race.

== Early life ==
Hawkins was born in Lake County, Florida to Virgil William Hawkins and Josephine Arbelle Hawkins (née Brown), as one of eight children. The family lived in a wood-frame on a ten-acre homestead near Okahumpka, Florida, purchased in 1895. The farm offered the family a way of supporting themselves, and both parents worked supplemental jobs for additional income. While living on the farm, the senior Hawkins ran a store and worked picking oranges, while Josephine cleaned and ironed clothing. Both of Hawkins' parents placed great emphasis on their children's education. The Hawkins were part of a 1917 community effort to raise $300 to build a school for African-American children with support from the Rosenwald Fund. The Okahumpka Rosenwald School was located a few yards from the Hawkins' home, allowing them to receive an elementary education.

Hawkins' maternal grandfather was Alfred Brown Osgood, a prominent African Methodist Episcopal Church minister and American legislator. At his mother's urging, his father also became an AME minister after serving as deacon. Hawkins' father had also held on to hope that his son would enter the church as he had. Upon finding out that his son wanted to be a lawyer, his father told him he was going to hell for lying.

Growing up in rural Florida during the era of Jim Crow laws, Hawkins witnessed many instances of racial violence. Early in his life, he witnessed several African American men being sentenced to prison for five to six months over a game of ten-cent dice. When asked if they plead guilty or not guilty, the men were unable to respond because they did not understand the meaning of the terms. As a teenager, Hawkins would return to court on his own to watch trials where African-American people did not have fair or reliable representation. With incidents such as these remaining in his mind, Hawkins decided to become a lawyer. He would later say of the incident "At that tender age, I didn't know what a lawyer did, but I knew I had to do something."

As a teenager in the mid-1920s, Hawkins attended the AME-operated Edward Waters College in Jacksonville, Florida. At the time, his home town in Lake County had no public schooling past tenth grade, so Hawkins made the 200 mile journey away from home to achieve his goal of becoming a lawyer. In 1930, Virgil began attending Lincoln University (Pennsylvania) to earn his bachelor's degree, but was unable to finish due to financial constraint. Hawkins was a graduate of Bethune–Cookman College, in Daytona Beach, Florida, which he was able to attend at the age of 37. He later served as Bethune–Cookman's director of public relations beginning in 1949.

Hawkins made his way back to Florida and married Ida Frazier, a schoolteacher, in the 1930s. Following in his wife's footsteps, Hawkins began teaching at Edgewood, a segregated elementary school in Groveland, Florida. For several years he commuted 50 miles to work at the school while he lived in Ocala, Florida. He moved on to being principal of Yalaha Elementary School in Yalaha, Florida. Finding the segregated school system to be fraught with inequalities in wages, facilities, and supplies, Hawkins again found himself thinking of how he could stand up against the everyday injustices faced by African Americans and returning to his childhood dream of becoming a lawyer.

In speaking to other African American attorneys, it was suggested to Hawkins that he attend a Black Law School, such as Howard University School of Law. However, Hawkins did not want to leave his home state, claiming "I could never afford Washington, and my wife--she'd never live so far from her family. And I didn't want Howard. I wanted Florida. My grandaddy felled trees here and my daddy paid taxes here."

== University of Florida Lawsuits ==
In 1949, Horace Hill, an NAACP lawyer in Daytona Beach, Florida sought to challenge existing discriminatory practices in education within the state of Florida. At that time, Florida would only provide scholarship to Black students to out of state schools. This was in light of the ruling of Missouri ex rel. Gaines v. Canada, which ruled that states must either provide Blacks with their own school or allow them to attend school with whites. In seeking a plaintiff to challenge a Florida school, Hill found Virgil Hawkins.

Hawkins applied to the University of Florida Law School, and was denied admission because of his race. He filed suit, but the Florida Supreme Court refused to admit him on the premise that a "separate but equal" law school was in the process of being established at Florida Agricultural and Mechanical University to accommodate Hawkins and other black law students in Florida.

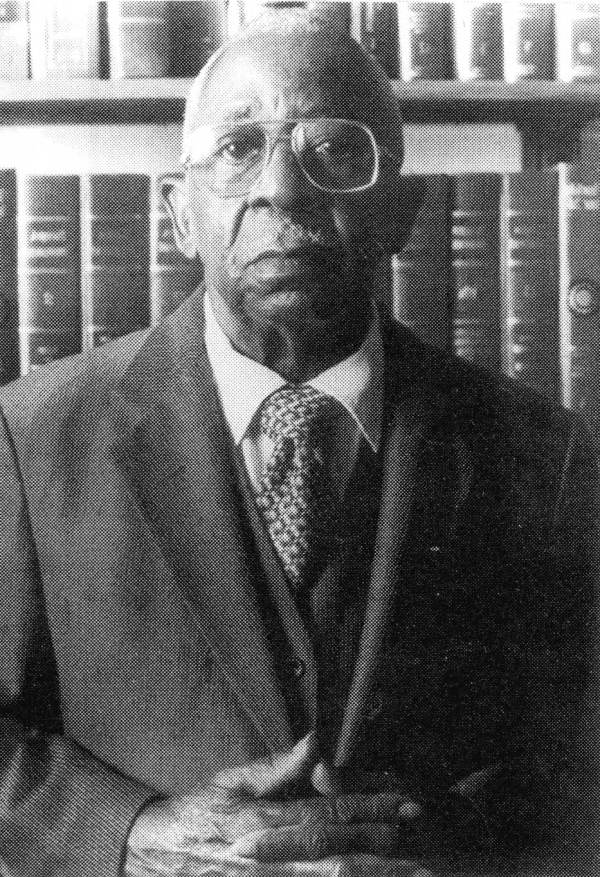
Hawkins in the 1960s

In 1956, the United States Supreme Court ruled in Florida ex Rel. Hawkins v. Board of Control, that Hawkins was "entitled to prompt admission [to the University of Florida Law School] under the rules and regulations applicable to other qualified candidates." However, Florida Governor LeRoy Collins "vowed to resist the order through every lawful means", and the Florida Supreme Court refused to admit Hawkins to the University of Florida because of the potential for "great public mischief" the admission of blacks to white state schools might cause. The public mischief referred to in the opinion consisted of threats by white parents to cause their children to drop out of or transfer to schools other than Florida's white state schools if blacks were allowed to attend.

In 1958, Hawkins withdrew his application to the University of Florida College of Law in exchange for a Florida Supreme court order desegregating the University of Florida's graduate and professional schools. Hawkins attended law school in Boston but was denied permission to take the Florida Bar exam because the law school was unaccredited. Through his sacrifice Hawkins paved the way for other African Americans to attend the University of Florida, and in 1962 W. George Allen became the first African American to graduate from the University of Florida College of Law. Finally, in 1976, the Florida Supreme Court ordered that Hawkins be admitted to The Florida Bar without having to take the bar exam in an attempt to remedy the injustices of the past.

Consequently, it was not until 1977, at the age of sixty-nine, that Hawkins opened his law office in Leesburg, Florida. The Florida Supreme Court later noted that Hawkins "seldom turned away an indigent client in need", but that "his advanced age and lapse of years since attending law school, the loss of a quality law school education, and the strain of practice as a sole practitioner made the successful practice of law difficult". He ultimately faced disciplinary proceedings for matters arising out of his practice. Unable to afford counsel, on one occasion he appeared before the Florida Supreme Court in proper person and pleaded, "When I get to heaven, I want to be a member of The Florida Bar". Finally, "[w]orn and weary from the struggles of the last half of his life, and still unable to retain counsel, Hawkins put down his sword, and attempted to leave the battlefield". Hawkins filed a petition to resign from The Florida Bar which was accepted by the Florida Supreme Court on April 18, 1985. Hawkins died on February 11, 1988.

Following his death, "[n]umerous attorneys throughout the state" joined a petition to the Florida Supreme Court to have Hawkins posthumously reinstated to the Florida Bar, a petition granted by the Court in October 1988.

== In popular culture ==
- Hawkins served as the namesake of Milestone Media and DC Comics character Static.
- Gilbert King (author) features Virgil Hawkins in his book "Beneath a Ruthless Sun".
