= Mount Dora, Florida =

City in Florida, United States

- City
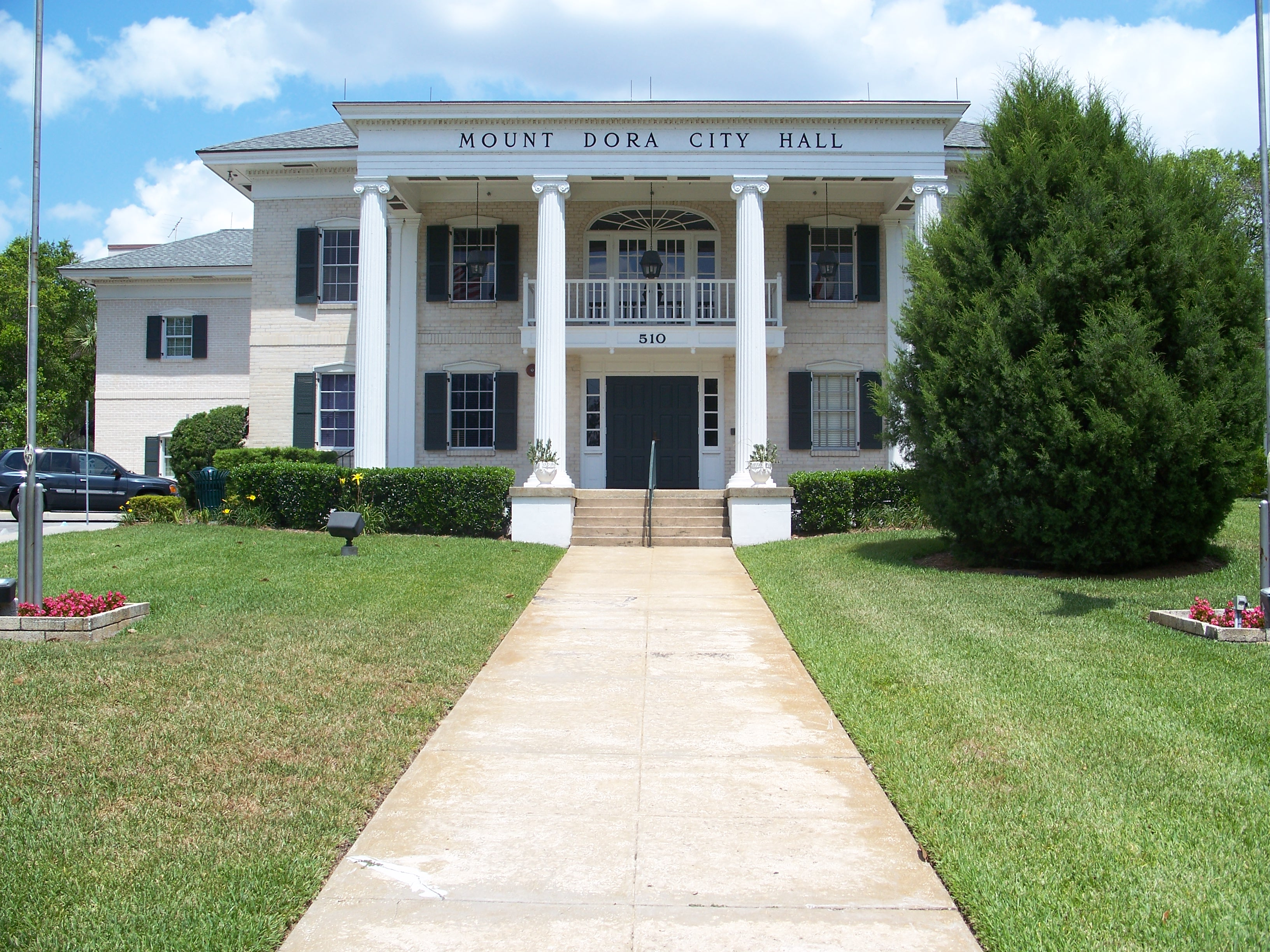
- City hall

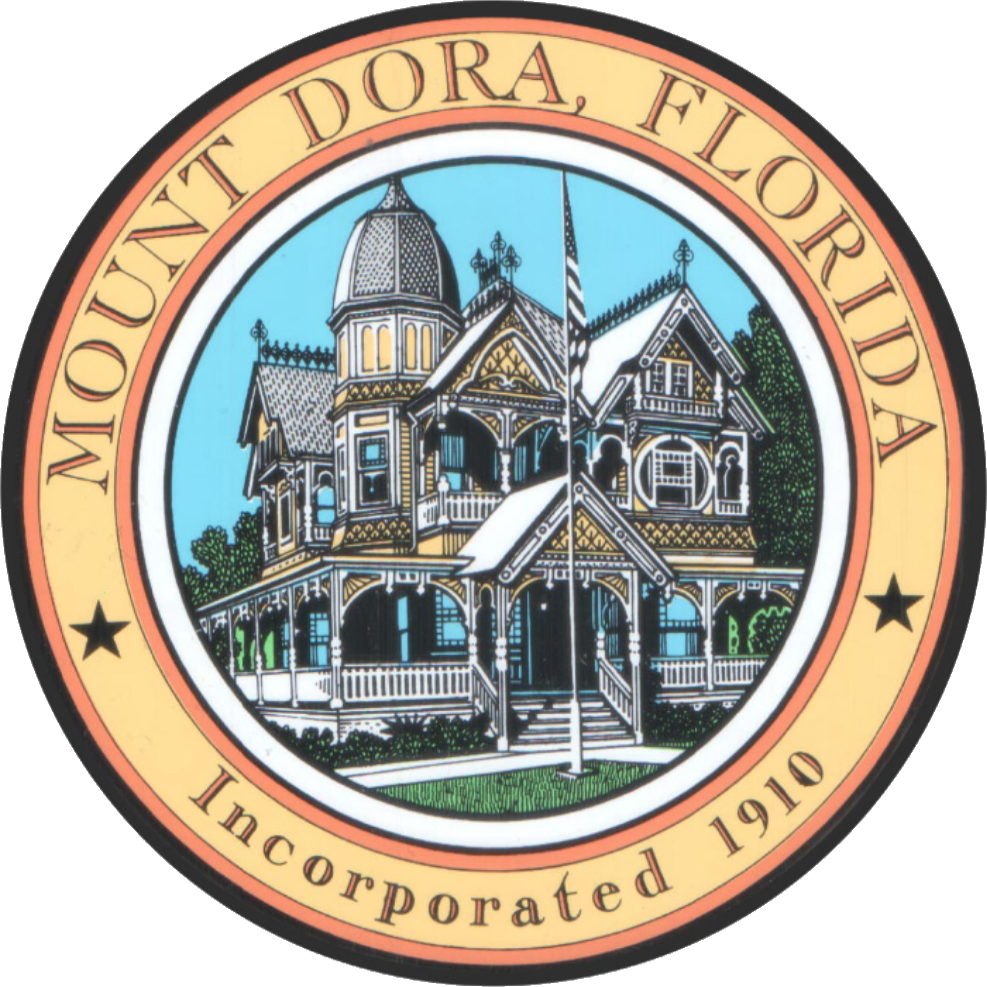
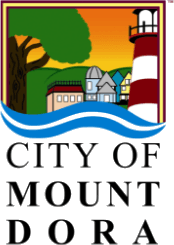
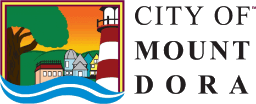
- Flag Seal Coat of arms Wordmark

- Location in Lake County and Florida
- Coordinates: 28°48′14″N 81°37′24″W
- Country: United States
- State: Florida
- County: Lake

Area
  - Total: 9.50 sq mi (24.60 km^{2})
  - Land: 8.35 sq mi (21.62 km^{2})
  - Water: 1.15 sq mi (2.98 km^{2})
- Elevation: 171 ft (52 m)

Population (2020)
  - Total: 16,341
  - Estimate (2025): 18,791
  - Density: 1,957.4/sq mi (755.74/km^{2})
- Time zone: UTC-5 (Eastern (EST))
  - Summer (DST): UTC-4 (EDT)
- ZIP codes: 32756-32757
- Area code: 352
- FIPS code: 12-47050
- GNIS feature ID: 2404318
- Website: www.mountdora.gov

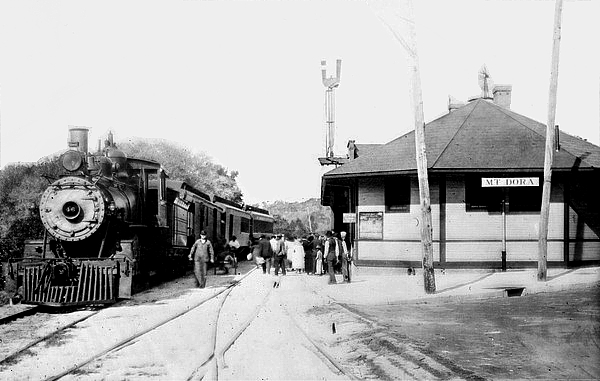
Railroad station circa 1920

Mount Dora is a city in Lake County, Florida. It is part of the Orlando-Kissimmee, Florida, metropolitan statistical area. Founded in 1880, Mount Dora is known for its small-town southern charm. It has many antique shops in the downtown area. The downtown area overlooks Lake Dora. Mount Dora is home to one of three freshwater lighthouses in Florida. It hosts many monthly festivals and is known as the "Festival City". As of the 2020 census, it had a population of 16,341.

== History ==
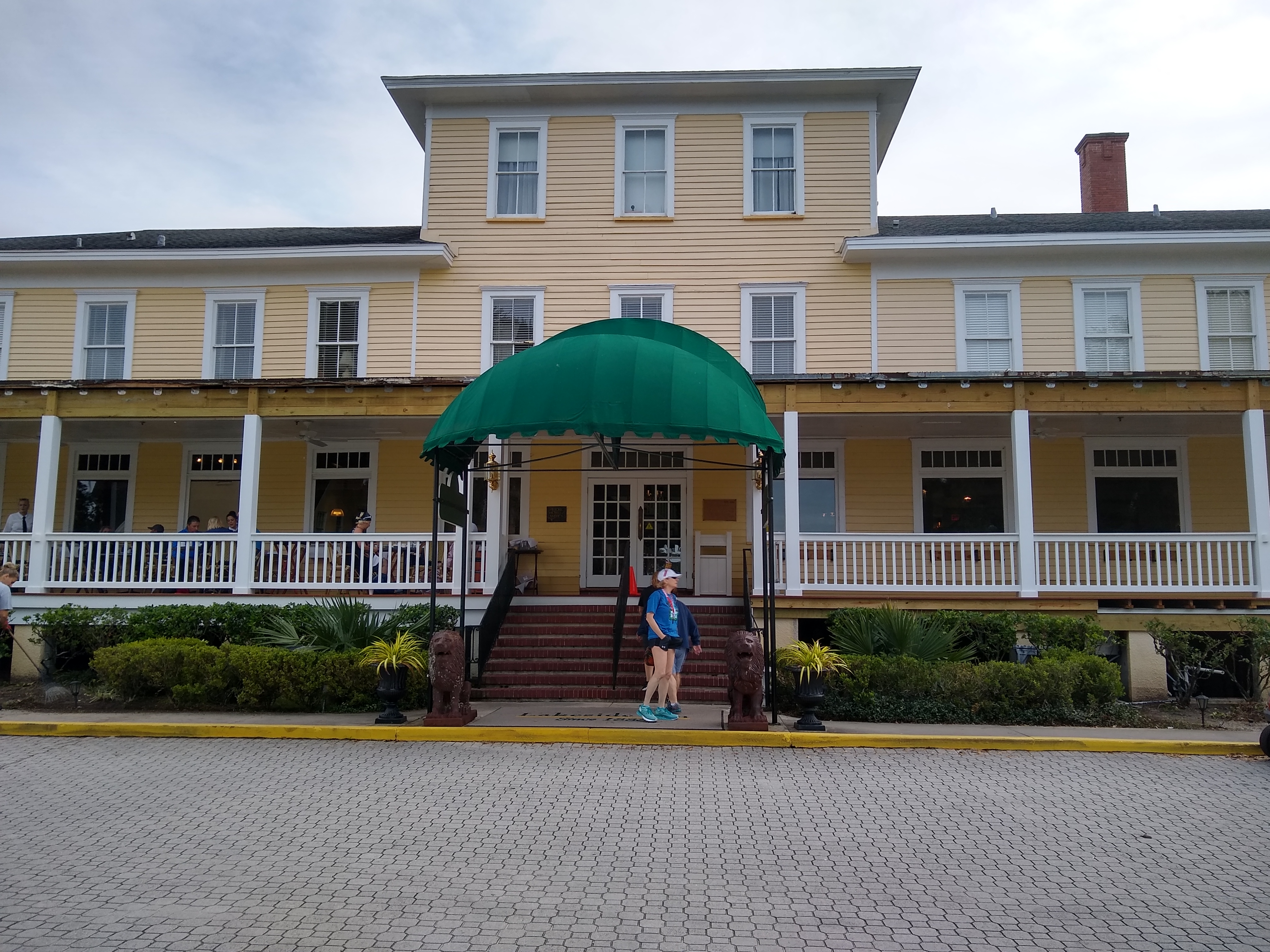
The front entrance of the Lakeside Inn

The town of Mount Dora began in 1874 when the area was settled by David Simpson, his wife, and two children. In 1880, Ross C. Tremain became the town's first postmaster, and later a major real-estate developer for the area. A post office called Mount Dora has been in operation since 1883. Tremain named the unincorporated village Royellou, after his children, Roy, Ella, and Louis. The community was renamed for Dora Ann Drawdy, who was an early settler of the town in the mid-1880s. In 1846, the surveyors named Lake Dora after her, and in 1883, the town was renamed after the lake. The Mount in Mount Dora reflects the fact that the town is on a plateau 184 feet above sea level. In addition to this, Dora is memorialized through Dora Drawdy Way, an alleyway located in the downtown area. The town’s original name is honored in a similar fashion through another alleyway simply named Royellou.

The town became a popular winter retreat for hunters, fishermen, and boaters, and in 1883, the Alexander House, a two-story hotel, was opened. The Alexander House has been renamed several times and was listed on the National Register of Historic Places in 1975. A railroad came to town in 1887, followed by an orange-packing house, fertilizer factories, and a cannery. The town was granted a charter in 1910 with John Philip Donnelly as its first mayor; the town had 371 residents at the time.

In the 1920s, Mount Dora began to grow significantly, both in residential development and business development. Mount Dora began investing in public infrastructure, including streetlights, a water system, curbs, and paved roads. The first two public parks were created and the Mount Dora Community Building was built largely from funds raised by Mount Dora residents. The building has since served as the city's performance and meeting venue.

In 2013, the City of Mount Dora began to develop an area of land called the Wolf Branch Innovation District. That plan was developed as the Wekiva Parkway started to expand and State Road 453 opened right into Mount Dora. The Wolf Branch Innovation District is currently being developed to become a high-technology and life-sciences business area. Expansion of infrastructure and roadways continues as Mount Dora prepares for future growth.

=== Historic sites ===
These buildings are listed on the National Register of Historic Places:

- Blandford
- John P. Donnelly House
- Lakeside Inn
- Old Mount Dora Atlantic Coast Line Railroad Station, home to the town's chamber of commerce
- Witherspoon Lodge of Free and Accepted Masons, No. 111

The Mount Dora Historic District is a U.S. historic district in downtown Mount Dora. The district is roughly bounded by 3rd Avenue, 11th Avenue, Clayton Street, and Helen Street. It was added to the National Register of Historic Places on October 1, 2009.

== Geography ==
Mount Dora is located in eastern Lake County. It is bordered to the south by Orange County, to the north by Eustis and Seminole State Forest, and to the west by Tavares and Lake Dora.

According to the United States Census Bureau, the city has a total area of 9.2 square miles (23.8 km^{2}), of which 1.2 square miles (3.0 km^{2}), or 12.51%, are covered by water. Overlooking Lakes Dora, Gertrude, and Beauclair, Mount Dora is situated on a plateau rising to 184 feet (56 m) above mean sea level, or slightly more than 100 feet (30 m) above the level of the lakes.

== Museums ==
Mount Dora is home to several different museums.

The Mount Dora History Museum is a project of the Mount Dora Historical Society. This museum is the location of the first fire station and city jail, which opened in 1923. The exhibits highlight activities in Mount Dora from the 1880s to the 1930s. The museum is located near Donnelly Park.

Modernism Museum Mount Dora opened in 2013 and is located on East Fourth Avenue. Two stories high, this museum focuses on the Studio Arts Movement, a form of modernism where high art meets craftsmanship, posing the question, "Is it sculpture, or is it furniture?"

The Mount Dora Center for the Arts is a multifaceted community center which provides fine arts gallery exhibitions, education programs for all ages and levels, an annual fine-art action, and monthly Art Strolls, and helps organize the Annual Mount Dora Arts Festival. Located on East Fifth Avenue, it was founded by a group of volunteers who wanted to celebrate the arts in Mount Dora and to promote and improve their arts festival.

== Parks ==
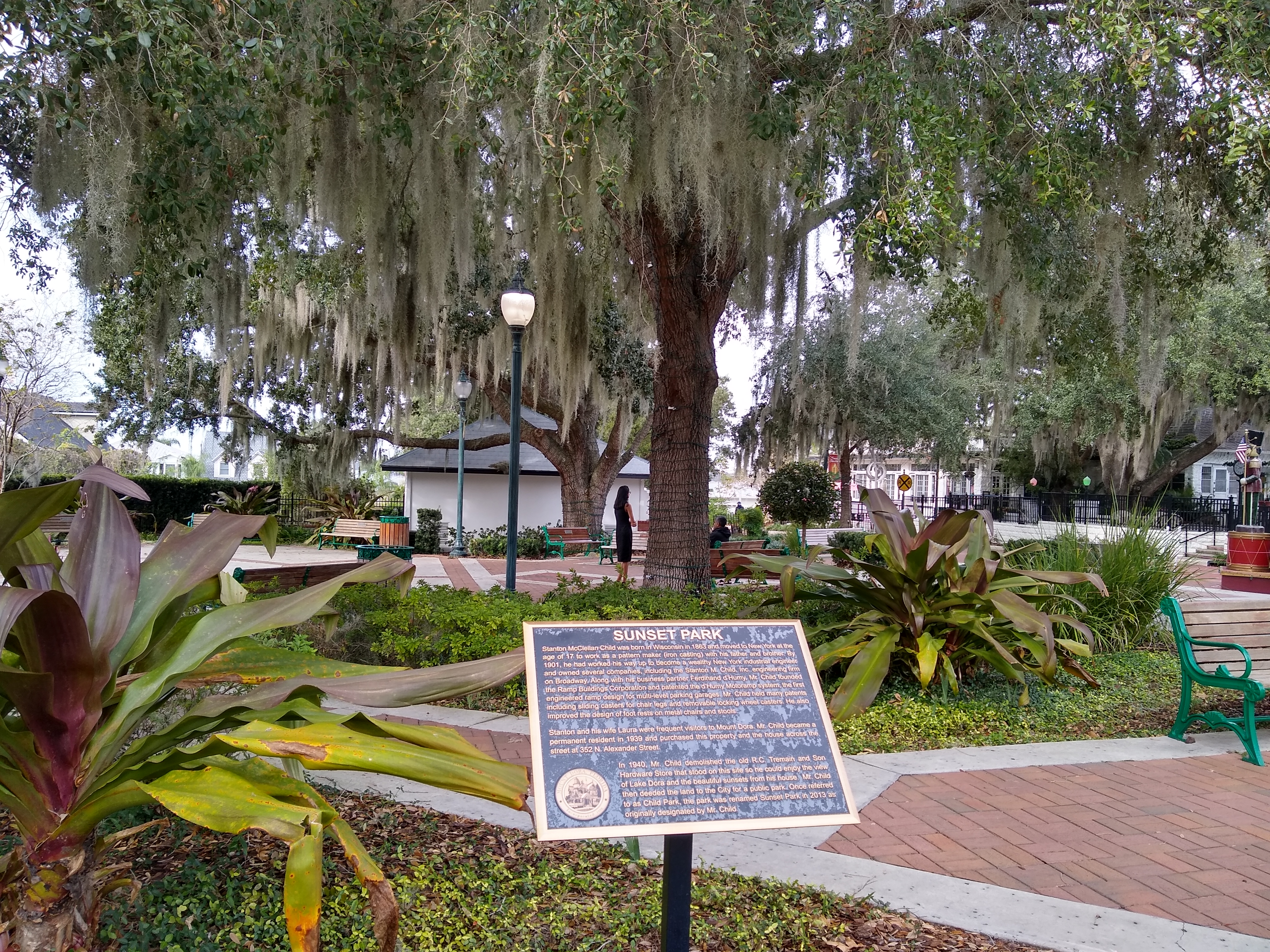
Sunset Park in Mount Dora, Florida in 2019

Mount Dora is home to several parks and nature preserves.

Gilbert Park is located at the intersection of Tremain Street and Liberty Avenue. This park was named for its donor, Mr. Earl Gilbert. The park includes a barbecue area, several pavilions, and a large playground. The park has recently gone through renovations, which included two new pavilions, upgraded restrooms, new landscaping, and improved parking. The "Wood Wonderland" playground was updated and expanded.

Annie Donnelly Park is located in the downtown Mount Dora area at the intersection of Donnelly Street and 5th Avenue. It is the location of their annual tree-lighting ceremony, and several of Mount Dora's special events. The park contains benches, restrooms, a fountain, shuffleboard courts, a tennis court, and three pickleball courts. It is the location of the Donnelly Park building, which can be rented out for special events.

Grantham Point Park is located on Tremain Street across from Gilbert Park on Lake Dora; Grantham Point Park is sometimes referred to as "Lighthouse Park". The 35-foot lighthouse was dedicated on March 25, 1988. Built of bricks covered with stucco, the lighthouse stands sentry over the Port of Mount Dora. Its 750-watt photocell powers a blue pulsator, sending out a guiding light to all boaters navigating Lake Dora after dusk. The Mount Dora Light is the only inland freshwater lighthouse in Florida.

The Lake County Water Authority has several preserves in the area.

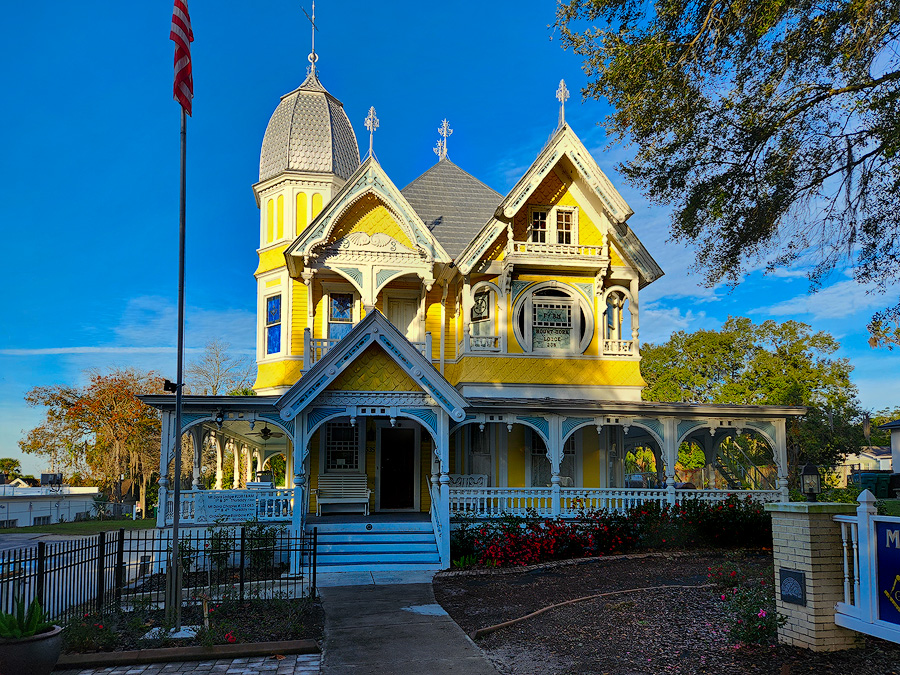
Donnelly House in Mt. Dora, Florida in 2024

== Demographics ==
Historical population
Census	Pop.	Note	%±
1920	725		—
1930	1,613		122.5%
1940	1,880		16.6%
1950	3,028		61.1%
1960	3,756		24.0%
1970	4,646		23.7%
1980	5,883		26.6%
1990	7,196		22.3%
2000	9,418		30.9%
2010	12,370		31.3%
2020	16,341		32.1%
2025 (est.)	18,791		15.0%
U.S. Decennial Census

=== Racial and ethnic composition ===
Mount Dora racial composition (Hispanics excluded from racial categories) (NH = Non-Hispanic)
Race	Pop 2010	Pop 2020	% 2010	% 2020
White (NH)	8,602	10,148	69.54%	62.10%
Black or African American (NH)	1,899	2,249	15.35%	13.76%
Native American or Alaska Native (NH)	42	38	0.34%	0.23%
Asian (NH)	214	334	1.73%	2.04%
Pacific Islander or Native Hawaiian (NH)	9	21	0.07%	0.13%
Some other race (NH)	13	65	0.11%	0.40%
Two or more races/Multiracial (NH)	143	547	1.16%	3.35%
Hispanic or Latino (any race)	1,448	2,939	11.71%	17.99%
Total	12,370	16,341		

=== 2020 census ===
As of the 2020 census, Mount Dora had a population of 16,341. The median age was 51.0 years. 16.5% of residents were under the age of 18 and 32.4% of residents were 65 years of age or older. For every 100 females there were 86.6 males, and for every 100 females age 18 and over there were 83.5 males age 18 and over.

99.5% of residents lived in urban areas, while 0.5% lived in rural areas.

There were 7,465 households in Mount Dora, of which 20.8% had children under the age of 18 living in them. Of all households, 42.5% were married-couple households, 17.5% were households with a male householder and no spouse or partner present, and 33.0% were households with a female householder and no spouse or partner present. About 33.4% of all households were made up of individuals and 17.2% had someone living alone who was 65 years of age or older.

There were 8,330 housing units, of which 10.4% were vacant. The homeowner vacancy rate was 3.2% and the rental vacancy rate was 7.0%.

=== 2010 census ===
As of the 2010 United States census, there were 12,370 people, 5,511 households, and 3,602 families residing in the city.

== Education ==
The district is home to two elementary schools, one middle school, and Mount Dora High School. The district is also home to nine private schools. Southern Technical College once operated a campus in the city; it has since closed.

== Transportation ==
=== Major roads ===
- US 441 is the main road that runs north and south throughout Mount Dora, and the only major road within the city. The route passes through the city northbound from Orlando, but then curves to the west to Tavares, the Lake county seat.
- SR 44 is the main west-to-east state highway in the city. It joins southbound US 441 in Leesburg in an overlap through Tavares and southern Eustis before branching off to the northeast in Mount Dora.
- SR 46 has its western end at US 441. A western county extension further into the city also exists.
- CR Old 441 is part of a former segment of US 441 that became US Business Route 441 and Florida State Road 500A before being downgraded into the county road that it is today.

=== Buses ===
Mount Dora is served by LakeXpress buses.

=== Railroads ===
Historically, Mount Dora has had two railroads running through it. The Sanford and Lake Eustis Railway which became part of the Atlantic Coast Line Railroad's Fort Mason-Sanford Line, and the Tavares, Orlando and Atlantic Railroad which was acquired by the Florida Central and Peninsular Railroad and eventually became part of the Seaboard Air Line Railroad's Orlando Subdivision. The two railroad were merged in 1967 to form Seaboard Coast Line Railroad. Today, the remnants of the lines are part of the Florida Central Railroadm which is used for freight only. Attempts to start heritage tourist railroads based in Tavares and the Orange Blossom Express commuter railroads have both failed

== Events ==
The city sponsors an annual Scottish Highland Festival, which will celebrate its 10th anniversary on Feb. 17 to 19, 2023. The event grows in popularity each year and features Scottish bands and musicians, Highland games, societies, historic re-enactors, and Mount Dora's own pipes and drums band, which performs in the area throughout the year.

The Mount Dora Center for the Arts hosts the Mount Dora Arts Festival, a juried fine-arts festival, on the first full weekend of February. The festival features works of fine art of several hundred national artists. The art for sale includes oil paintings, watercolors, acrylics, clay, sculpture, and photography. The festival also includes live musical entertainment and food.

The Mount Dora Spring Festival of Arts and Crafts is held every third weekend in March in the downtown area. The festival includes more than 250 fine and fun handcraft items and original art for sale on the streets of the historic downtown walking district. The festival lasts for two days.

The Sailboat Regatta and Mount Dora Earth Day are held in April. The regatta, which is hosted by the Mount Dora Yacht Club, is the oldest in the state and is celebrate its 70th year in 2023. Mount Dora Earth Day Celebration is a one-day event held on a Saturday around the annual international Earth Day. The event celebrates its 25th year in 2020 in Donnelly park.

The Mount Dora Blueberry Festival takes place on the last weekend in April, hosted by Visit Mount Dora, and is held in Donnelly Park. The free festival celebrates local blueberry farms as the industry takes over citrus in the farming community. It is a two-day event

The Mount Dora Chamber of Commerce holds Florida's oldest bicycle festival annually in early October. It is three-day event. The festival includes a variety of daily rides, ranging from 8 to 100 miles.

Mount Dora's largest event, the Mount Dora Craft Fair, draws over 250,000 visitors every fourth weekend in October. It features more than 400 talented crafters and artists, and includes an eclectic mix of arts and crafts from sculptures to ceramics to paintings to woodworking. The Mount Dora Craft Fair was ranked the number-one All Time BEST Classic/Contemporary Craft Festival in America by Sunshine Artists magazine in their 50th annual ranking of events under the organization of festival coordinator, Janet Gamache.

The Mount Dora Plant and Garden Fair takes place on the second weekend in November in Donnelly Park. Growers of exotic and native plants from all over Florida gather to share and sell their plants to the public. It is a two-day event.

The Jane Austen Fest is held every February as a 3-day event, with many participants dressing in regency era clothing, noted guest speakers, staged readings of Austen's works, lawn bowling, an authentic Regency dinner and English country dance lessons.

== Attractions ==
- Lake Dora
- Downtown Mount Dora
- Mount Dora Lighthouse
- Dora Canal
- Gilbert Park
- Mount Dora Arts Festival
- Modernism Museum Mount Dora
- Renniger Antique Center

== In fiction ==
=== Film ===
The buildings in downtown Mount Dora were painted pink for the feature film Honky Tonk Freeway. Being a movie location provided an economic boost for merchants, helped restore the downtown area, and gave Mount Dora some national publicity.

=== Books ===
The fictional town of Fort Repose in the 1959 post-apocalyptic novel Alas, Babylon is based on Mount Dora.

== Sister cities ==
- Forres, Scotland
