= Mount Dora Historic District =

Historic district in Florida, United States

- U.S. National Register of Historic Places
- U.S. Historic district
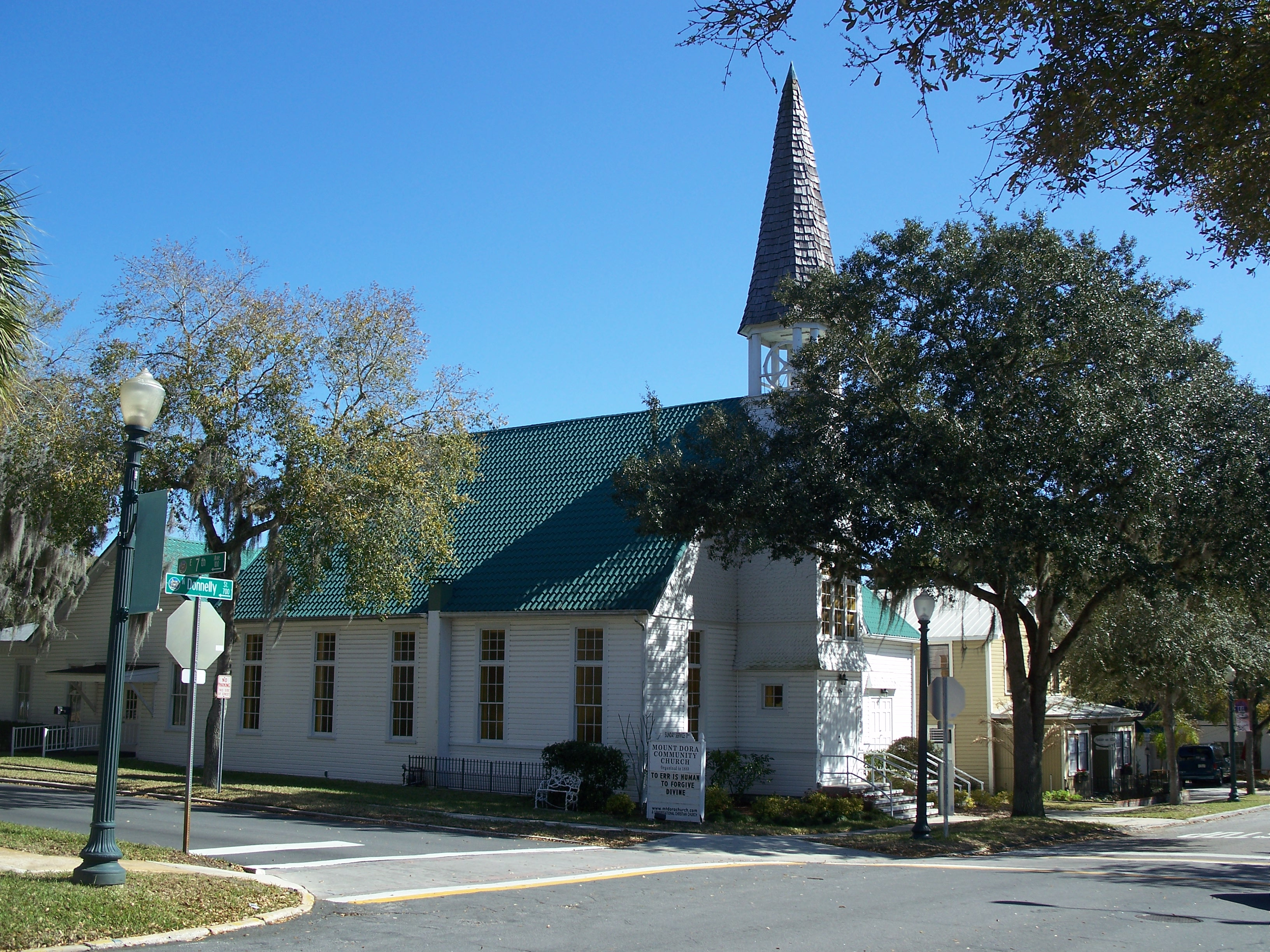
- Church in the district

- Location within Florida Location within the United States
- Location: Mount Dora, Florida
- Coordinates: 28°48′09″N 81°38′37″W
- NRHP reference No.: 09000777
- Added to NRHP: October 1, 2009

Mount Dora Historic District is a U.S. historic district in Mount Dora, Florida, Lake County. The district is roughly bounded by 3rd Avenue, 11th Avenue, Clayton Street, and Helen Street. The historic district features many buildings from the early 20th century.

The historic district is home to many festivals throughout the year, including the Mount Dora Craft Fair and the Mount Dora Art Festival, which draws an estimated 150,000 to 200,000 people to the town.

It was added to the National Register of Historic Places on October 1, 2009.
