= Bowers Bluff Middens Archeological District =

Historic district in Florida, United States

- U.S. National Register of Historic Places
- U.S. Historic district
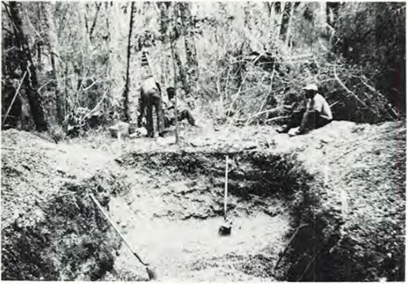

- Location within Florida Location within the United States
- Location: Lake County, Florida
- Nearest city: Astor
- Coordinates: 29°06′19″N 81°30′12″W
- NRHP reference No.: 80000952
- Added to NRHP: 1 February 1980

The Bowers Bluff Middens Archeological District is a U.S. historic district (designated as such on February 1, 1980) located approximately five miles southeast of Astor, Florida.
