= Moses J. Taylor House =

Historic house in Florida, United States

- U.S. National Register of Historic Places
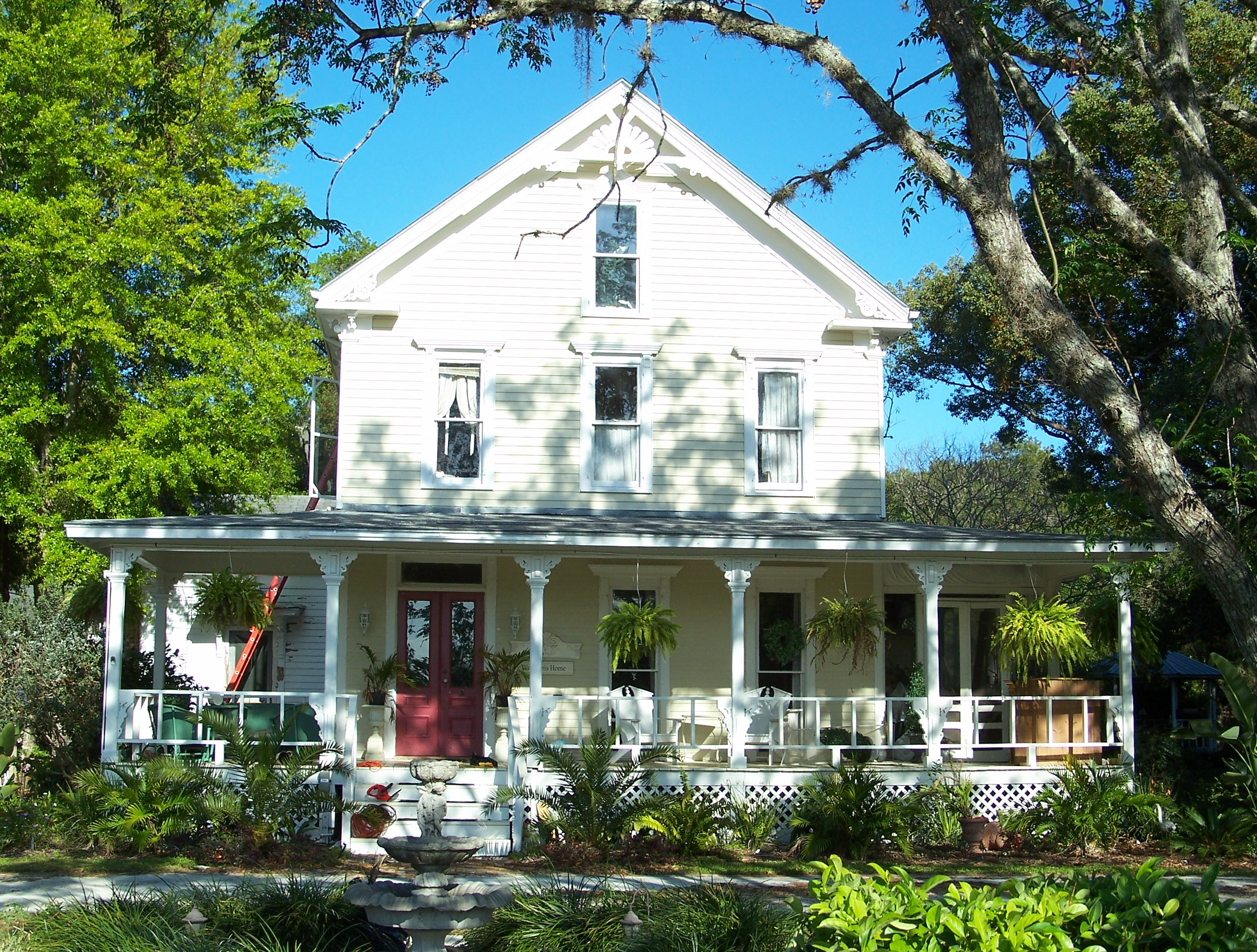

- Location within Florida Location within the United States
- Location: Eustis, Florida
- Coordinates: 28°51′2″N 81°40′20″W
- Area: 1.33 acres (0.54 ha)
- Built: c. 1881
- Architectural style: Italianate
- NRHP reference No.: 97000840
- Added to NRHP: August 1, 1997

The Moses J. Taylor House, also known as the Dreamspinner Bed and Breakfast Inn, is a historic home in Eustis, Florida that has been operated as a bed and breakfast since about 1997. It was built in about 1881 as a two-and-a-half-story private home with elements of Italianate architecture. It was on a large property surrounded by citrus groves of the Taylor family until the land was split off for residential subdivisions built in the 1950s and 1960s.

It was added to the National Register of Historic Places in 1997. The property then included four non-contributing structures in addition to the one contributing building.

Moses J. Taylor was involved in the incorporation of Eustis as a town and served as its first town clerk.

Italianate elements of the house include a cornice with decorative brackets, chamfered columns on its wraparound porch, and pedimented windows and doors. Its gable ends include jig-sawn truss work that is described as Gothic Revival in style.
