= Lakeside Inn (Mount Dora, Florida) =

- U.S. National Register of Historic Places
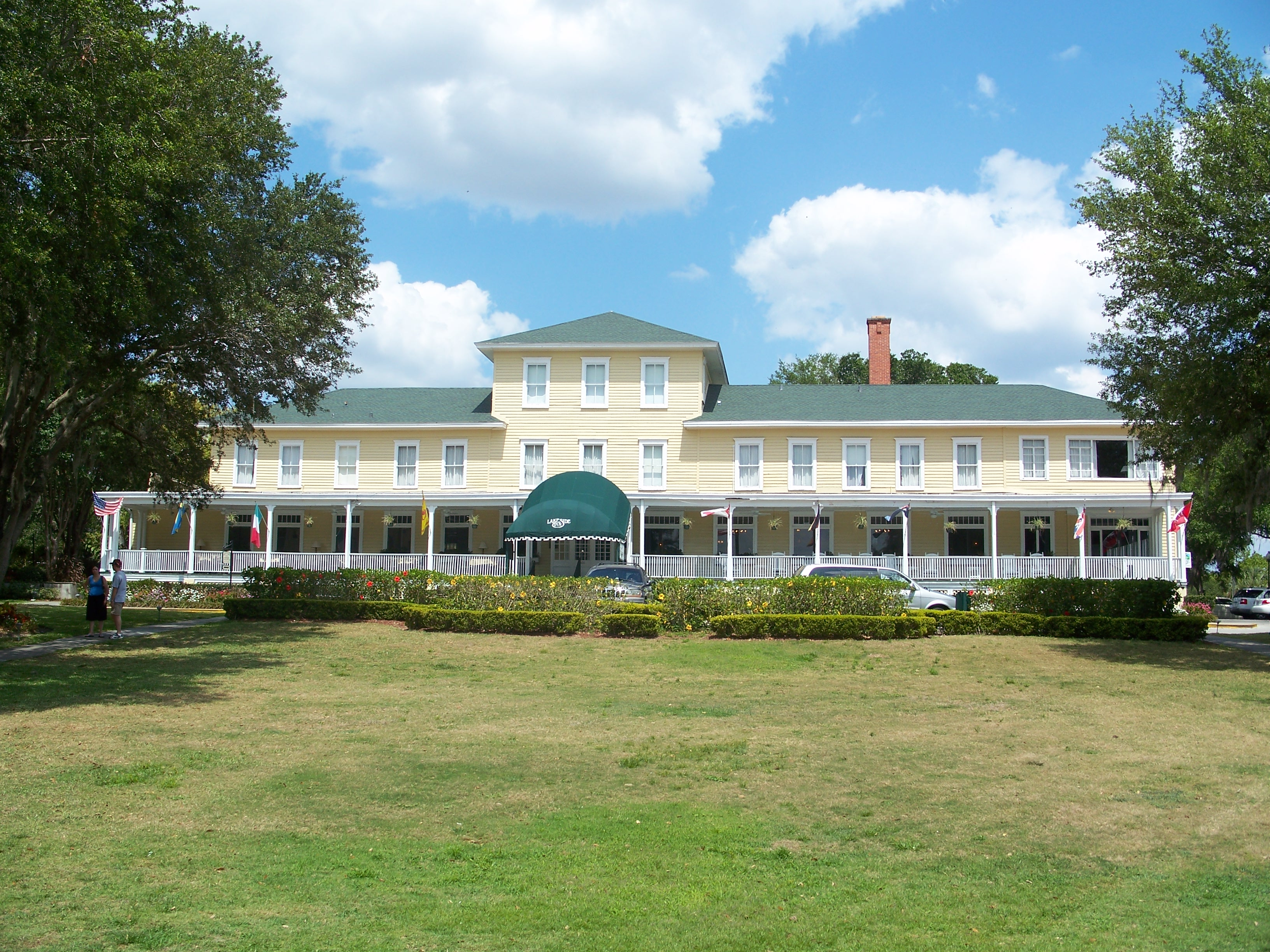

- Location within Florida Location within the United States
- Location: Mount Dora, Florida
- Coordinates: 28°47′52″N 81°38′42″W
- NRHP reference No.: 87000481
- Added to NRHP: March 19, 1987

The Lakeside Inn is a historic site in Mount Dora, Florida. It is located at 100 North Alexander Street. On March 19, 1987, it was added to the U.S. National Register of Historic Places. It was for sale in 2010, and purchased by new owners, who planned to renovate it, later that year. The Lakeside Inn, originally named the Alexander House, was built in 1883 by the partnership of Col. John M. Alexander, Col. John A. McDonald (real estate dealer from Eustis), and his daughter, Annie McDonald Stone. The partners hired Caroline Bruce to manage the ten-room inn as they were busy with other interests. In 1895, Caroline Bruce left in order to start her own establishment, the Bruce House. Management of the hotel shifted to Emma Boone and it was renamed the Lake House. Boone married George D. Thayer in May of 1903, and Thayer formed a stock company to operate the hotel. Boone died in 1909 and Thayer continued management of the hotel after remarrying in 1920 to Dora Berry Thayer, until his retirement in 1924. The Gatehouse was built in 1908 and the Sunset Cottage was built in 1914. The hotel was sold to Archie Hulbert, an experienced hotel operator from Boston. A three-story center, dining room, kitchen, and circular driveway were added. Operation was then shifted over to Lakeside Inn Properties Inc. (headed by Charles Edgerton and Fred Wentworth) in 1933. It is the oldest continuously operating hotel in the State of Florida and the last of the Grand Victorian Era Hotels still remaining in Central Florida and is said to be the most historic hotel there. Throughout its 130-year history, Lakeside Inn has hosted many noted dignitaries and celebrities, including President Calvin Coolidge and First Lady Grace Coolidge, for a month-long stay in the winter of 1930. Lakeside Inn has also been distinguished as the number one venue in the Central Florida Lakes Region for wedding ceremonies and receptions
