= Kimball Island Midden Archeological Site =

- U.S. National Register of Historic Places
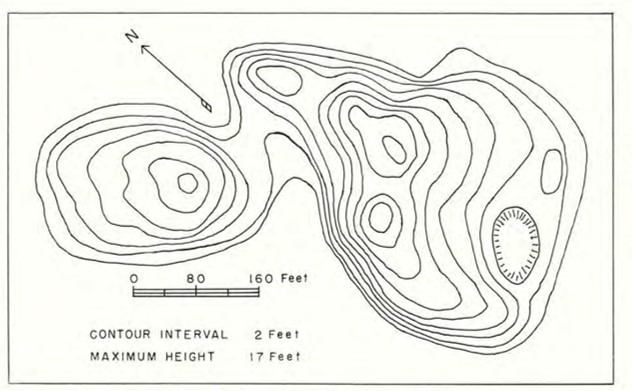
- Contour Map of Kimball Island Midden

- Location within Florida Location within the United States
- Location: Lake County, Florida
- Nearest city: Astor
- Coordinates: 29°04′55″N 81°28′11″W
- NRHP reference No.: 79000675
- Added to NRHP: December 11, 1979

The Kimball Island Midden Archeological Site is an archaeological site near Astor, Florida. It is located approximately seven miles southeast of Astor, within Ocala National Forest. On December 11, 1979, it was added to the U.S. National Register of Historic Places.

The archeological site is across the St. Johns River from the Lake Woodruff National Wildlife Refuge in Volusia County.
