= First United Methodist Church of Umatilla =

Historic church in Florida, United States

- U.S. National Register of Historic Places
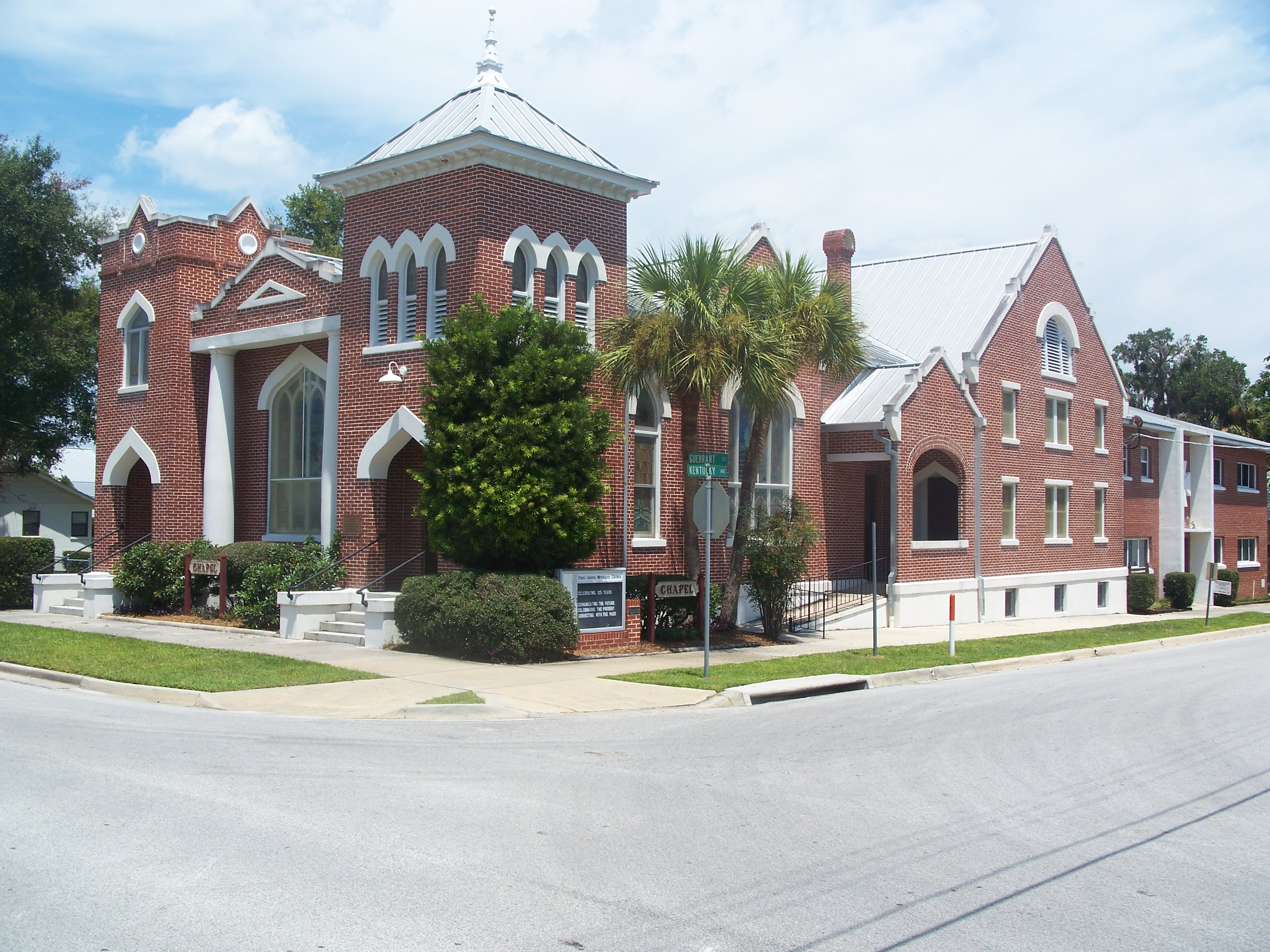

- Location within Florida Location within the United States
- Location: Umatilla, Florida United States
- Coordinates: 28°55′39″N 81°40′17″W
- Built: 1922
- Architect: Ira A. Rice
- Architectural style: Gothic, Classical, Prairie, and Italian Renaissance Styles
- NRHP reference No.: 99001707
- Added to NRHP: January 27, 2000

The First United Methodist Church of Umatilla (listed as the Methodist Episcopal Church, South, at Umatilla) is an historic Methodist church in Umatilla, Florida, in the United States. It is located at 100 West Guerrant Street. On January 27, 2000, it was added to the National Register of Historic Places.

It is a one-story brick with an irregular plan and a complex cross-gable roof, which was built in 1922. It has "two entry towers, pointed windows with stained glass, and a pedimented main facade with two classical columns", and it incorporated the frame shell of an 1886 predecessor building.
