= Blandford (Mount Dora, Florida) =

- U.S. National Register of Historic Places
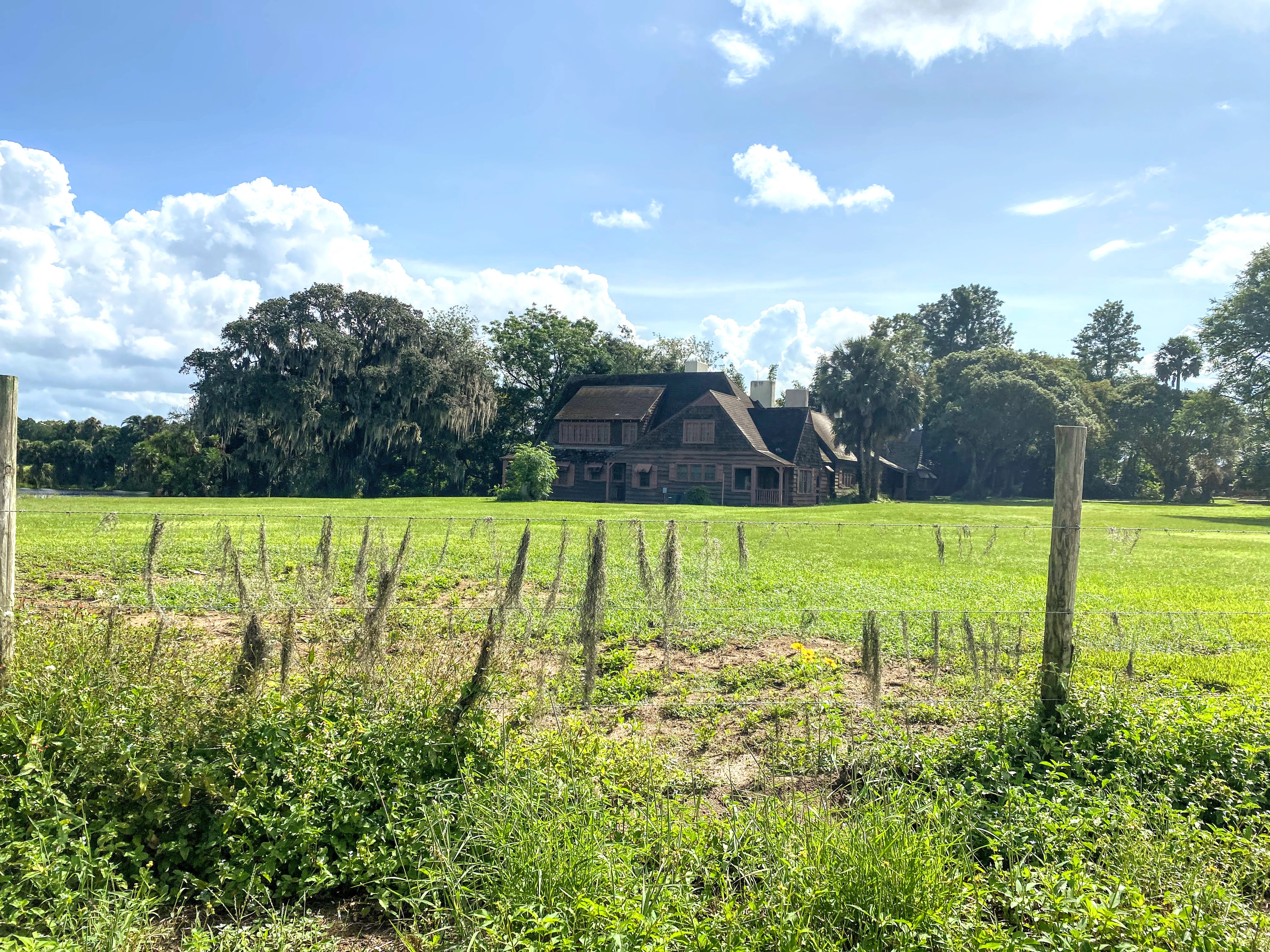

- Location within Florida Location within the United States
- Nearest city: Mount Dora, Florida
- Coordinates: 28.7585°N 81.6706°W
- NRHP reference No.: 07001115
- Added to NRHP: November 1, 2007

Blandford is a historic building at 28242 Lake Terry Drive near Mount Dora, Florida, United States. On November 1, 2007, it was added to the U.S. National Register of Historic Places.
