= Carnegie Library (disambiguation) =

A Carnegie library is a library built with money donated by Scottish-American businessman and philanthropist Andrew Carnegie.

Carnegie Library, or similar, may also refer to:

== United Kingdom ==
- Carnegie Library, Herne Hill, England
- Carnegie Library, Runcorn, England
- Carnegie Library, Teddington, England
- Carnegie Library, Wrexham, Wales
- Bridgwater Public Library, Bridgwater, England

== United States ==
=== Alabama ===
- Carnegie Library (Dublin, Georgia)

=== Arizona ===
- Phoenix Carnegie Library and Library Park
- Carnegie Library (Prescott, Arizona)

=== California ===
- Carnegie Library (Anaheim, California))
- Colton Carnegie Library
- Andrew Carnegie Library (Corona, California)
- Dixon Carnegie Library, listed on the National Register of Historic Places (NRHP) in Solano County
- Carnegie Free Library (Eureka, California)
- Livermore Carnegie Library and Park
- Carnegie Art Museum (Oxnard, California)
- Carnegie Free Library (Petaluma, California)
- Carnegie Library (Upland, California)
- Healdsburg Carnegie Library

=== Colorado ===
- Carnegie Library (Boulder, Colorado)
- Carnegie Library (Monte Vista, Colorado)
- Carnegie Public Library (Rocky Ford, Colorado)
- Carnegie Public Library (Trinidad, Colorado), NRHP-listed in Las Animas County

=== District of Columbia ===
- Carnegie Library of Washington D.C.

=== Florida ===
- Bradenton Carnegie Library
- Mirror Lake Library or Carnegie Library
- Carnegie Library at FAMU

=== Georgia ===
- Carnegie Library Building (Athens, Georgia)
- Carnegie Library (Atlanta)
- Carnegie Library of Barnesville
- Carnegie Library (Dublin, Georgia)
- Carnegie Library of Moultrie
- Carnegie Library of Valdosta

=== Idaho ===
- Carnegie Public Library (Boise, Idaho)

=== Indiana ===
- Carnegie Center for Art & History, New Albany, originally opened as a Carnegie Library
- Carnegie Library of Covington
- Carnegie Public Library (Anderson, Indiana)
- Colfax Carnegie Library
- Greensburg Carnegie Public Library
- Carnegie Library (Muncie, Indiana)
- Rensselaer Carnegie Library

=== Iowa ===
- Carnegie Library Building (Carroll, Iowa)
- Clarinda Carnegie Library
- Perry Carnegie Library Building
- Carnegie Library (Sheldon, Iowa)

=== Kansas ===
- Carnegie Library (Newton, Kansas)
- Carnegie Library (Parsons, Kansas)
- Carnegie Library (Peabody, Kansas)
- Carnegie Library Building (Manhattan, Kansas)
- Carnegie Library Building (Washburn University), Topeka
- Carnegie Library Building (Wichita, Kansas)
- Lyndon Carnegie Library

=== Kentucky ===
- Carnegie Library (Corbin, Kentucky)
- Carnegie Library (Danville, Kentucky)
- Carnegie Library (Hickman, Kentucky)
- Carnegie Library (Lexington, Kentucky), part of the Gratz Park Historic District
- Carnegie Public Library (Shelbyville, Kentucky)

=== Michigan ===
- Carnegie Public Library (Escanaba, Michigan)
- Ironwood Carnegie Library
- Carnegie Public Library (Ishpeming, Michigan)

=== Minnesota ===
- Bemidji Carnegie Library
- Carnegie Public Library (Crookston, Minnesota), NRHP-listed in Polk County
- Dawson Carnegie Library (Dawson, Minnesota), NRHP-listed in Lac qui Parle County
- Madison Carnegie Library (Madison, Minnesota)
- Redwood Falls Carnegie Library (Redwood Falls, Minnesota), NRHP-listed in Redwood County

=== Missouri ===
- Carnegie Library of Albany (Albany, Missouri)

=== Montana ===
- Carnegie Public Library (Big Timber, Montana)
- Carnegie Public Library (Havre, Montana)
- Carnegie Public Library (Missoula, Montana), NRHP-listed in Missoula County

=== Nebraska ===
- Carnegie Public Library (Gothenburg, Nebraska)

=== New Jersey ===
- Carnegie Library (Montclair, New Jersey)

=== New Mexico ===
- Carnegie Library (Roswell, New Mexico)

=== New York ===
- Carnegie Library (Niagara Falls, New York)
- Carnegie Library (North Tonawanda, New York)
- Carnegie Library (Syracuse University)

=== Ohio ===
- Carnegie Public Library (East Liverpool, Ohio)
- Carnegie Library (Sandusky, Ohio)

=== Oklahoma ===
- Carnegie Library (El Reno, Oklahoma)
- Carnegie Library (Guthrie, Oklahoma)
- Carnegie Library (Lawton, Oklahoma)

=== Pennsylvania ===
- Carnegie Free Library of Allegheny
- Carnegie Free Library of Beaver Falls
- Carnegie Free Library of Braddock
- Andrew Carnegie Free Library & Music Hall (Carnegie, Pennsylvania)
- Carnegie Free Library (Connellsville, Pennsylvania)
- Carnegie Library of Homestead, in Munhall
- Carnegie Free Library (McKeesport, Pennsylvania)
- Carnegie Library of Pittsburgh

=== South Carolina ===
- Carnegie Free Library (Gaffney, South Carolina)
- Carnegie Public Library (Sumter, South Carolina)

=== South Dakota ===
- Carnegie Public Library (Brookings, South Dakota), NRHP-listed in Brookings County
- Dallas Carnegie Library
- Carnegie Public Library (Dell Rapids, South Dakota), NRHP-listed in Minnehaha County
- Milbank Carnegie Library, NRHP-listed in Grant County
- Redfield Carnegie Library
- Carnegie Free Public Library (Sioux Falls, South Dakota)
- Carnegie Free Public Library (Watertown, South Dakota)

=== Tennessee ===
- Carnegie Library (Nashville, Tennessee)

=== Texas ===
- Carnegie Public Library (Belton, Texas), NRHP-listed in Bell County
- Carnegie Public Library (Tyler, Texas)

=== Washington ===
- Andrew Carnegie Library (Edmonds, Washington)
- Carnegie Library (Hoquiam, Washington)

=== Washington, D.C. ===
- Carnegie Library (Washington, D.C.)

=== West Virginia ===
- Carnegie Library (Parkersburg, West Virginia)
- Carnegie Public Library (Huntington, West Virginia)

=== Wisconsin ===
- Carnegie Free Library (Sturgeon Bay, Wisconsin)

=== Wyoming ===
- Carnegie Public Library (Buffalo, Wyoming)

== Elsewhere ==
- Carnegie Library of Reims, France

== See also ==
- Andrew Carnegie
- Carnegie Foundation (disambiguation)
- List of Carnegie libraries in Europe
- List of Carnegie libraries in the United States
- Category:Carnegie libraries
