= List of Carnegie libraries in Montana =

Montana Carnegie library buildings still standing

The following list of Carnegie libraries in Montana provides detailed information on United States Carnegie libraries in Montana, where 17 libraries were built from 17 grants (totaling $219,200) awarded by the Carnegie Corporation of New York from 1901 to 1918. As of 2013, 15 of these buildings are still standing, and 9 still operate as libraries.

== Key ==
Building still operating as a library
Building standing, but now serving another purpose
Building no longer standing
Building listed on the National Register of Historic Places Building contributes to a historic district on the National Register of Historic Places

== Carnegie libraries ==
	Library	City or town	Image	Date granted	Grant amount	Location	Notes
1	Big Timber	Big Timber		May 16, 1911	$7,500	314 McLeod St. 45°49′57″N 109°57′7″W	
2	Bozeman	Bozeman		Mar 14, 1902	$15,000	35 N. Bozeman Ave. 45°40′49″N 111°2′4″W	Now houses law offices
3	Chinook	Chinook		Oct 29, 1918	$15,000	421 Ohio St.	
4	Dillon	Dillon		Jan 22, 1902	$7,500	121 S. Idaho St. 45°12′59″N 112°38′13″W	
5	Fort Benton	Fort Benton		Mar 31, 1916	$15,000	1518 Main St.	
6	Glasgow	Glasgow		Apr 8, 1907	$7,500		Demolished about 1965
7	Great Falls	Great Falls		Jun 21, 1901	$31,700		Demolished about 1965
8	Hamilton	Hamilton		Jul 23, 1914	$9,000	306 State St.	
9	Hardin	Hardin		Mar 31, 1916	$7,500	419 N. Custer Ave.	
10	Havre	Havre		Mar 14, 1913	$12,000	447 4th Ave. 48°32′57″N 109°40′35″W	Now the Old Library Art Gallery
11	Kalispell	Kalispell		Dec 21, 1901	$10,000	302 2nd Ave. E.	Now the Hockaday Museum of Art
12	Lewistown	Lewistown		Jan 19, 1905	$10,000	701 W. Main St. 47°3′41″N 109°25′47″W	Completed in 1906, opened in 1907
13	Livingston	Livingston		Mar 20, 1903	$10,000	228 W. Callender St.	Opened October 1904
14	Malta	Malta		Feb 3, 1917	$15,000	S. 1st St. 48°21′35″N 107°52′34″W	Now a museum
15	Miles City	Miles City		Jul 16, 1901	$10,000	1 S. 10th St.	
16	Missoula	Missoula		Jan 13, 1903	$12,500	335 N. Pattee St. 46°52′21″N 113°59′29″W	Now the Missoula Art Museum
17	Red Lodge	Red Lodge		Jun 11, 1914	$15,000	3 W. 8th St.	

== See also ==
- List of libraries in the United States
