= National Register of Historic Places listings in Grant County, South Dakota =

Location of Grant County in South Dakota

This is a list of the National Register of Historic Places listings in Grant County, South Dakota.

This is intended to be a complete list of the properties and districts on the National Register of Historic Places in Grant County, South Dakota, United States. The locations of National Register properties and districts for which the latitude and longitude coordinates are included below, may be seen in a map.

There are 15 properties and districts listed on the National Register in the county.

This National Park Service list is complete through NPS recent listings posted May 1, 2026.

== Current listings ==
	Name on the Register	Image	Date listed	Location	City or town	Description
1	Big Stone City Hall	Big Stone City Hall	July 28, 2004 (#04000764)	469 Main; 45°17′37″N 96°27′48″W	Big Stone City	No longer extant.
2	Brown Earth Presbyterian Church	Brown Earth Presbyterian Church	August 29, 1984 (#84003288)	Northeast of Stockholm; 45°07′20″N 96°46′20″W	Stockholm	
3	First Congregational Church of Milbank	First Congregational Church of Milbank	April 19, 1978 (#78002553)	E. 3rd Ave. 45°13′31″N 96°37′39″W	Milbank	
4	First National Bank of Milbank	First National Bank of Milbank	April 19, 1978 (#78002554)	225 S. Main St. 45°13′13″N 96°38′10″W	Milbank	
5	First State Bank Building	First State Bank Building	February 26, 1987 (#87000221)	2nd Ave and 4th St; 45°00′59″N 96°34′17″W	Revillo	
6	Herman Freiwald Barn	Herman Freiwald Barn	February 19, 2008 (#08000045)	48603 148th St. 45°14′20″N 96°28′23″W	Big Stone City	
7	James A. and Ida Bell Gold House	James A. and Ida Bell Gold House	February 19, 2008 (#08000046)	202 2nd Ave. 45°17′51″N 96°27′52″W	Big Stone City	
8	Grant County Courthouse	Grant County Courthouse	February 10, 1993 (#92001858)	Junction of Park Ave. and Main St. 45°13′03″N 96°38′08″W	Milbank	
9	Hollands Grist Mill	Hollands Grist Mill	February 24, 1981 (#81000573)	U.S. Route 12; 45°13′21″N 96°37′07″W	Milbank	
10	Emil and Hannah Johnson House	Emil and Hannah Johnson House	February 19, 2008 (#08000047)	117 Diggs Ave. 45°13′39″N 96°38′20″W	Milbank	
11	George and Mary Koch Farm	George and Mary Koch Farm	February 19, 2008 (#08000048)	14849 474th Ave. 45°13′48″N 96°43′18″W	Twin Brooks	
12	Lebanon Lutheran Church	Lebanon Lutheran Church	September 15, 1977 (#77001244)	146 St and 452 Ave; 45°16′02″N 97°09′52″W	Summit	
13	Milbank Carnegie Library	Milbank Carnegie Library	November 21, 1978 (#78002555)	S. 3rd Ave. 45°13′31″N 96°38′17″W	Milbank	
14	Ole Nelson Barn	Ole Nelson Barn	February 19, 2008 (#08000049)	14674 454th Ave. 45°15′30″N 97°07′20″W	Summit	
15	Swedish Lutheran Church of Strandburg	Swedish Lutheran Church of Strandburg	February 17, 1978 (#78002556)	162 St and 472 Ave; 45°02′27″N 96°45′38″W	Strandburg	

== See also ==
- List of National Historic Landmarks in South Dakota
- National Register of Historic Places listings in South Dakota
