= Malta Airport (Montana) =

- IATA: MLK; ICAO: none; FAA LID: M75

Summary
- Airport type: Public
- Owner: Phillips County Regional Airport Authority
- Serves: Malta, Montana
- Elevation AMSL: 2,254 ft / 687 m
- Coordinates: 48°22′01″N 107°55′10″W

Map
- Location of airport in Montana

Runways
Direction	Length		Surface
Direction	ft	m	Surface
8/26	4,500	1,372	Asphalt

Statistics (2012)
- Aircraft operations: 4,100
- Based aircraft: 13
- Source: Federal Aviation Administration

Malta Airport (IATA: MLK, FAA LID: M75) is a public use airport located one nautical mile (2 km) northwest of the central business district of Malta, a city in Phillips County, Montana, United States. It is owned by the Phillips County Regional Airport Authority. This airport is included in the National Plan of Integrated Airport Systems for 2011–2015, which categorized it as a general aviation facility.

The current airport was built between 1996 and 2000. Malta Airport was formerly located at 48°20′56″N 107°53′6″W, which is now the site of a business and industry development district.

== Facilities and aircraft ==
Malta Airport covers an area of 280 acres (113 ha) at an elevation of 2,254 feet (687 m) above mean sea level. It has one runway designated 8/26 with an asphalt surface measuring 4,500 by 75 feet (1,372 x 23 m).

For the 12-month period ending July 19, 2012, the airport had 4,100 aircraft operations, an average of 11 per day: 88% general aviation and 12% air taxi. At that time there were 13 single-engine aircraft based at this airport.

== See also ==
- List of airports in Montana
