= KMMR =

- Malta, Montana; United States
- Broadcast area: Central Phillips County, Montana
- Frequency: 100.1 MHz
- Branding: KMMR Radio

Programming
- Format: Full-service
- Affiliations: ABC News Radio; Northern Broadcasting System

Ownership
- Owner: KMMR Radio, Inc.

History
- First air date: September 8, 1980
- Call sign meaning: Malta Montana Radio

Technical information
- Licensing authority: FCC
- Facility ID: 39749
- Class: A
- ERP: 2,250 watts
- HAAT: 115 meters (377 ft)
- Transmitter coordinates: 48°15′17″N 107°49′18″W

Links
- Public license information: Public file; LMS
- Webcast: Listen live
- Website: www.kmmrfm.com

KMMR is a broadcast radio station licensed to Malta, Montana, serving Malta and Phillips County, Montana. KMMR broadcasts a Full Service format, featuring agricultural news/talk and various music formats. KMMR is owned and operated by KMMR Radio, Inc.
