= Carnegie Library (Upland, California) =

- Carnegie Library, Upland, CA
- U.S. National Register of Historic Places
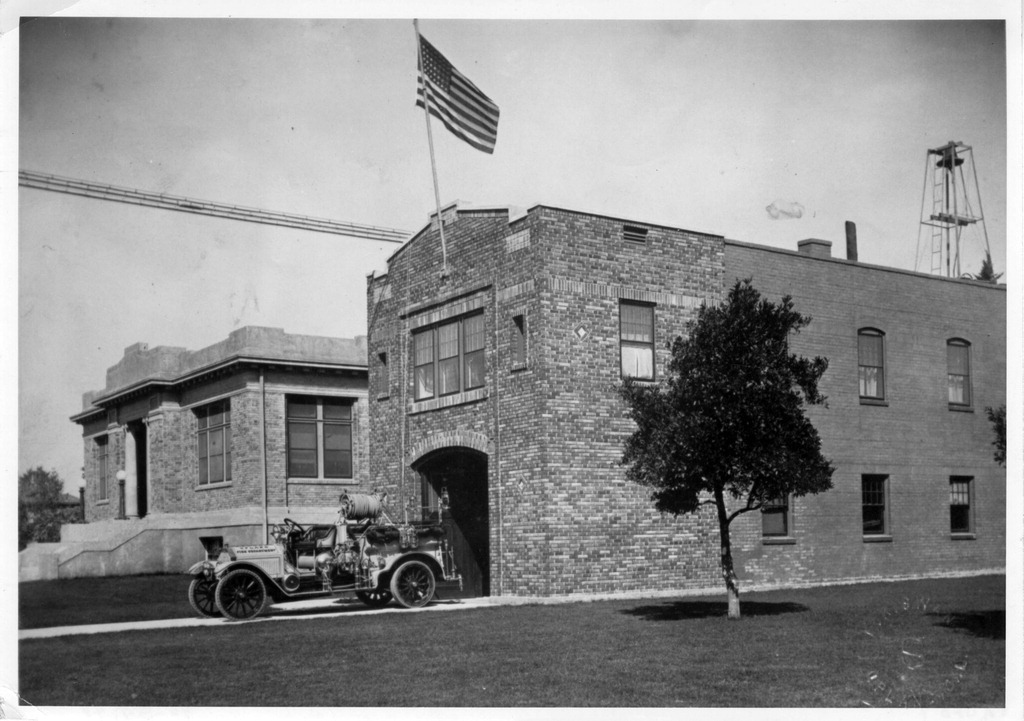
- The library and the neighboring fire station circa 1915

- Location within California Location within the United States
- Location: 123 E. D St., Upland, California
- Coordinates: 34°5′55″N 117°38′55″W
- Area: less than one acre
- Built: 1913
- Architect: Glidden, Homer W.
- Architectural style: Classical Revival
- MPS: California Carnegie Libraries MPS
- NRHP reference No.: 90001817
- Added to NRHP: December 10, 1990

The Carnegie Library, historically known as the Upland Public Library, is a Carnegie library located at 123 East D Street in Upland, California. Built in 1913, the library was the first public building in Upland. Architect Homer W. Glidden designed the library in the Classical Revival style. The library's design features a projecting central entrance with a plain frieze supported by two columns and brick pilasters, a stucco parapet extending around most of the building, and a cornice set above dentils. The building served as a library until 1969, when the library moved to a new building. The City of Upland still owns the building and rents it to the public for community events. It is also used by the Upland Public Library to house its Literacy Program.

The library was added to the National Register of Historic Places on December 10, 1990.
