= Dallas Carnegie Library =

- U.S. National Register of Historic Places
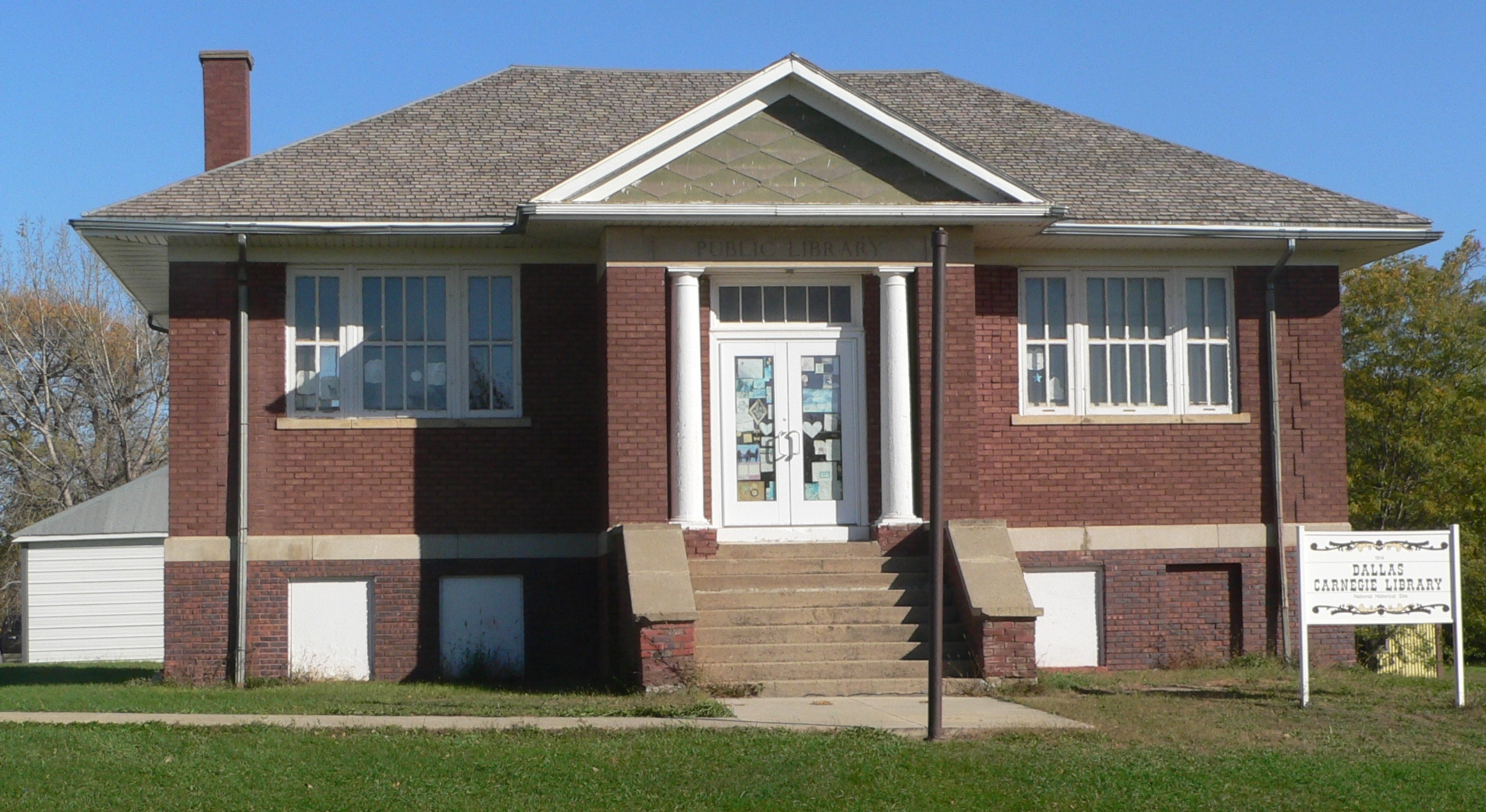

- Location within South Dakota Location within the United States
- Location: Off US 18, Dallas, South Dakota
- Coordinates: 43°14′10″N 99°31′01″W
- Area: less than one acre
- Built: 1913
- Architectural style: Greek Revival
- NRHP reference No.: 76001734
- Added to NRHP: May 28, 1976

The Dallas Carnegie Library, located off US 18 in Dallas, South Dakota, is a Carnegie library built in 1913. It was listed on the National Register of Historic Places in 1976.

It is a Greek Revival-style brick building on a raised basement.
