= Washburn University Carnegie Library Building =

- U.S. National Register of Historic Places
- Location within Kansas Location within the United States
- Location: Off Seventeenth St. and Washburn Ave., Topeka, Kansas
- Coordinates: 39°2′8″N 95°42′3″W
- Area: less than one acre
- Built: 1904
- Built by: James Cuthbert & Sargent
- Architectural style: Classical Revival
- MPS: Carnegie Libraries of Kansas TR
- NRHP reference No.: 87000972
- Added to NRHP: June 25, 1987

The Washburn University Carnegie Library Building in Topeka, Kansas, United States, is a Carnegie library built in 1904. It was listed on the National Register of Historic Places in 1987.

Washburn College, later Washburn University of Topeka, established in 1865, obtained a $40,000.00 Carnegie Library grant for its construction in 1904.
