= Madison Carnegie Library =

- U.S. National Register of Historic Places
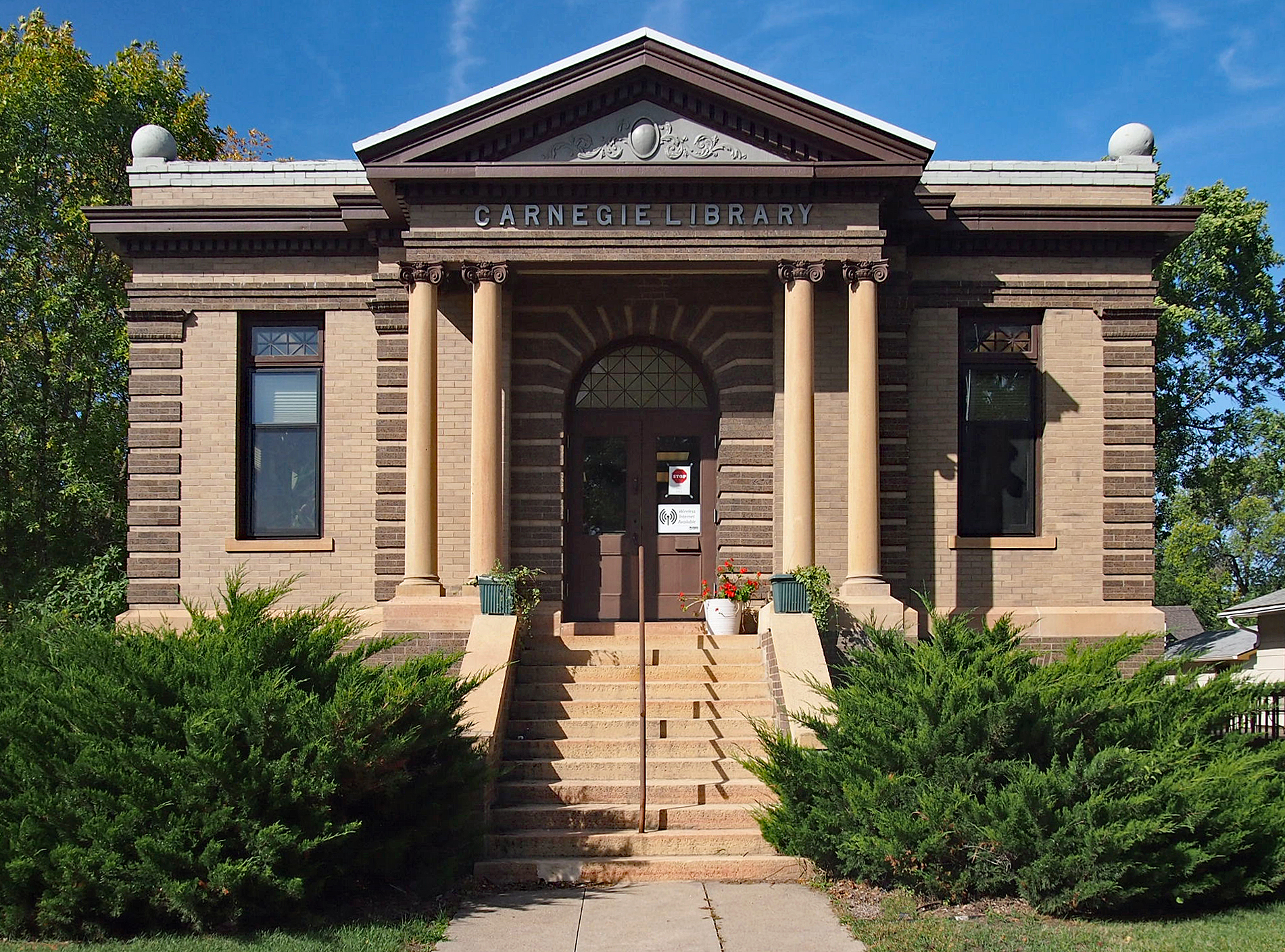
- The Madison Public Library's original entrance

- Location within Minnesota Location within the United States
- Location: Madison, Minnesota
- Coordinates: 45°0′44.96″N 96°11′35.39″W
- Built: 1905
- Architect: Ralph D. Church and Gerhard Herriges
- Architectural style: Neoclassicism
- NRHP reference No.: 85001823
- Added to NRHP: August 23, 1985

The Madison Carnegie Library or Madison Public Library, located at 401 Sixth Avenue, Madison, in the U.S. state of Minnesota is a public library building built in 1905 of brick with limestone trim. Its characteristic features include a columned and pedimented main entrance and a small polygonal dome on its flat roof. The structure was built with an $8,000 grant from Andrew Carnegie. This was one of over 3,000 libraries in 47 states funded by Carnegie. Local residents gave an additional $1,000 in gifts and books at its dedication on January 22, 1906. Gerhard Herriges, a contractor for public buildings in Western Minnesota, built the building for $6,216.85.
