= Swedish Lutheran Church of Strandburg =

Historic church in South Dakota, United States

- U.S. National Register of Historic Places
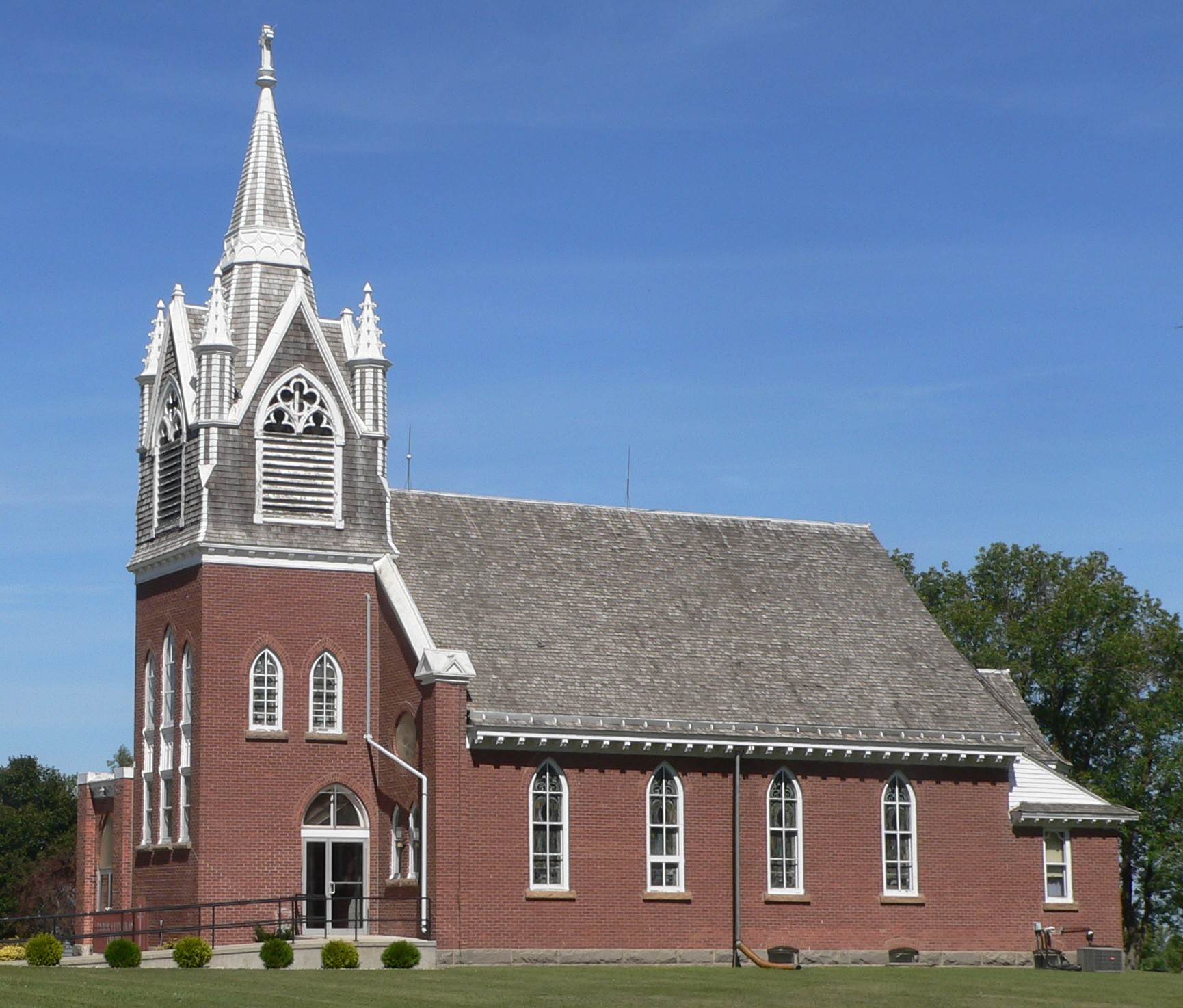

- Location within South Dakota Location within the United States
- Location: 162 St and 472 Ave, Strandburg, South Dakota
- Coordinates: 45.040823°N 96.760493°W
- Built: 1910
- Architect: Schold, Erick
- Architectural style: Gothic
- NRHP reference No.: 78002556
- Added to NRHP: February 17, 1978

Swedish Lutheran Church of Strandburg (now Tabor Lutheran Church of Strandburg) is a historic church on Main Street in Strandburg, South Dakota. It is affiliated with the Evangelical Lutheran Church in America. The church was added to the National Register in 1978.

The church was built in 1910. It is a one-story brick church with a steep gable roof, brackets under the overhanging roof, arched windows and steeple in the front. Several of the stained glass windows depict Biblical scenes. The structure displays a modified Late Victorian Gothic Style. There is a second-floor balcony in the entry steeple to view church services from above. There is also a fully finished basement for small gatherings.
