= Carnegie Library, Herne Hill =

Public library in South London, England

Coordinates: 51.460686°N 0.096513°W

Carnegie Library
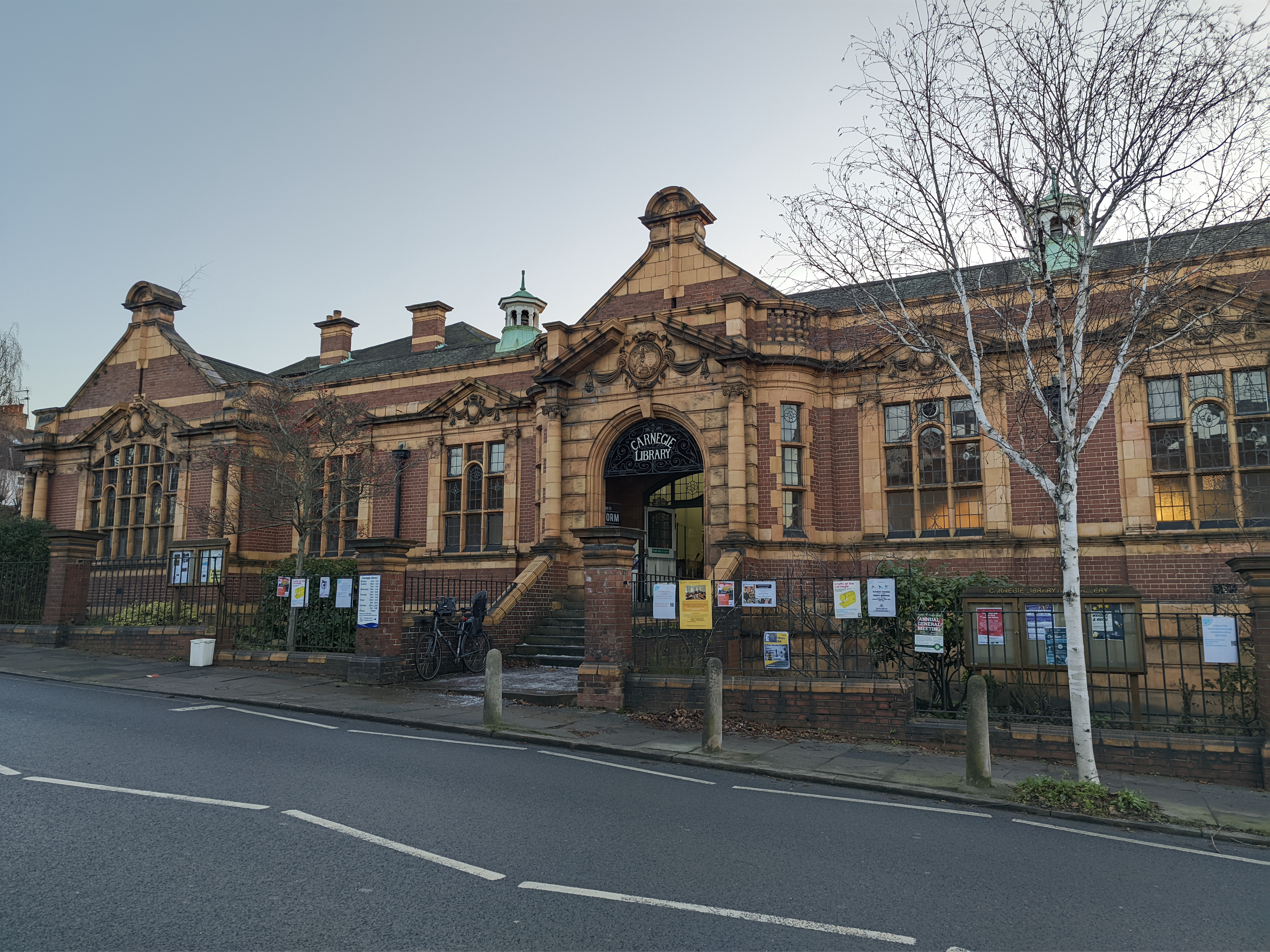
- Carnegie Library in Herne Hill
- Location: 192 Herne Hill Road, Herne Hill, London, SE24 0DG, United Kingdom
- Type: Public library
- Established: 1906 (120 years ago)
- Branches: 1

Collection
- Items collected: Books, public records

Other information
- Website: www.lambeth.gov.uk/libraries-0/carnegie-library

The Carnegie Library is a public library in the London Borough of Lambeth in Herne Hill, South London. The library opened in 1906. It closed as a public lending library in 2016 as a result of cuts to funding, reopening in 2018 with a reduced librarian service.

== History ==
The Carnegie Library was funded by a grant of £12,500 from Andrew Carnegie (1835–1919) and designed by the architects Wakeford and Sons. This building was one of 2,509 libraries established worldwide with a legacy from Carnegie. Like many Carnegie libraries, the Herne Hill library has elegant architectural features, such as large windows and a glass dome which provide plenty of natural light, graceful Corinthian columns, and parquet floors. It was opened in 1906 and is a Grade II listed building. Historic England notes as one of its reasons for the Grade II designation that "the library is almost unchanged externally, and the internal arrangement remains legible despite later, internal alterations which are largely reversible."

== Present day ==
The library was closed by Lambeth Council from March 2016 to February 2018, when it reopened with a reduced service. The library was occupied in protest at its closure for nine days by members of the local community, including senior citizens and teenagers studying for A level exams. Protesters from campaign group Defend The Ten voluntarily left the library before being evicted, and the occupation ended with a protest march to Brixton Library.

The occupation was supported by many famous authors including Stella Duffy, Neil Gaiman, Nick Hornby and Colm Tóibín, and had a great deal of public support, as shown by a mass demonstration of over 2,000 people who marched from the library to the town hall when the occupation ended.

In October 2018, the Carnegie Community Trust received a Heritage Lottery Resilience Fund grant to run a Community Hub within the building. According to local news site BrixtonBuzz, "Lambeth Council wants the Trust to manage the building – despite opposition from the Friends of Carnegie Library."
