= Carnegie Library (Lawton, Oklahoma) =

- U.S. National Register of Historic Places
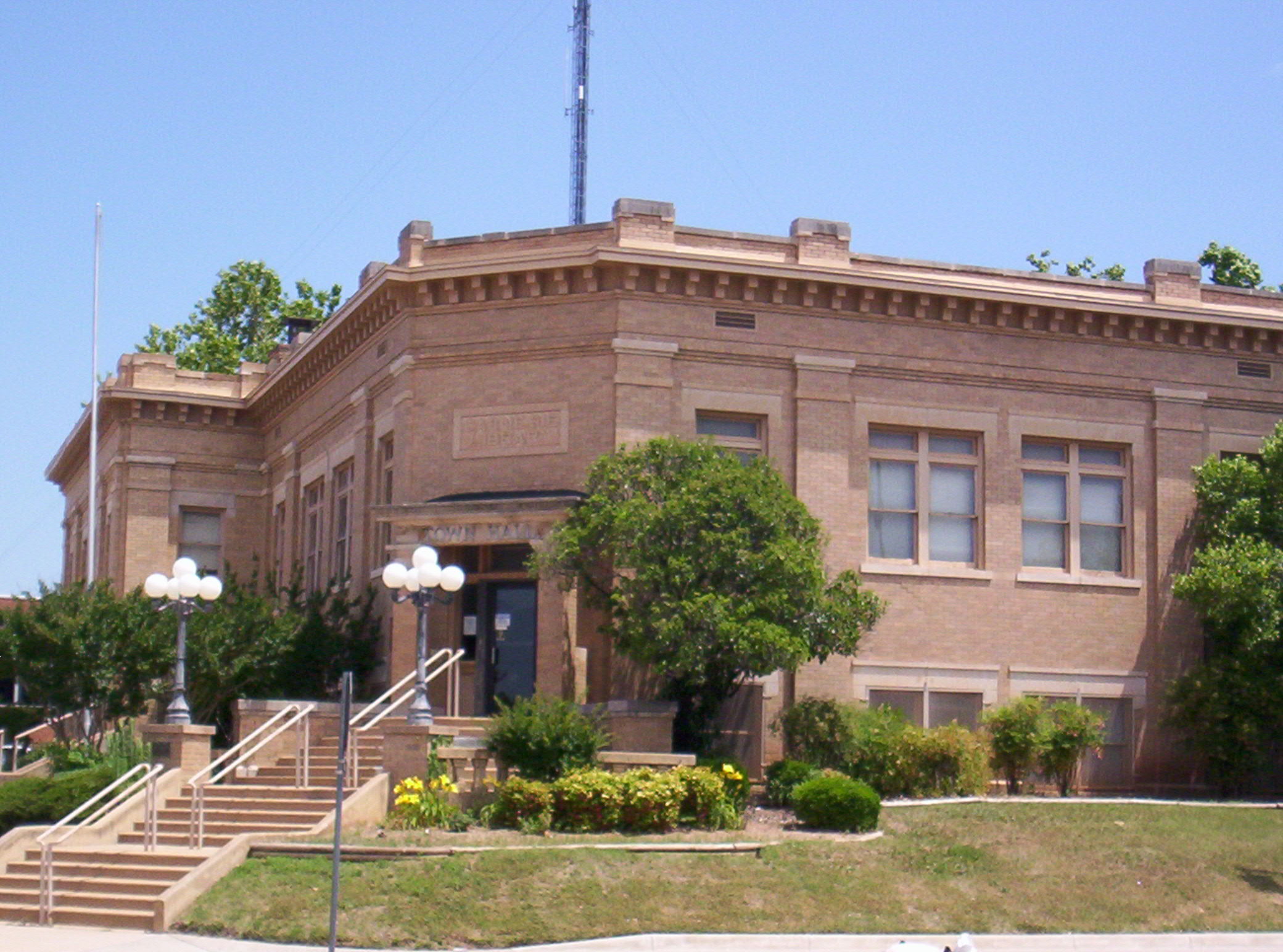

- Location within Oklahoma Location within the United States
- Location: B Ave. and 5th St., Lawton, Oklahoma
- Coordinates: 34°36′24″N 98°23′40″W
- Area: less than one acre
- Built: 1922
- Architect: Smith, J.W.
- Architectural style: Classical Revival
- NRHP reference No.: 76001560
- Added to NRHP: August 19, 1976

The Carnegie Library in Lawton, Oklahoma is a Carnegie library building from 1922. It was listed on the National Register of Historic Places in 1976.

It is built of buff-tan brick, with white limestone used for the window trim and other ornamentation.

It was originally a 52 by 52 feet (16 m × 16 m) square plan building, but a 1952 extension added 40 feet (12 m) to the north side.
