= Phillips County Carnegie Library =

- U.S. National Register of Historic Places
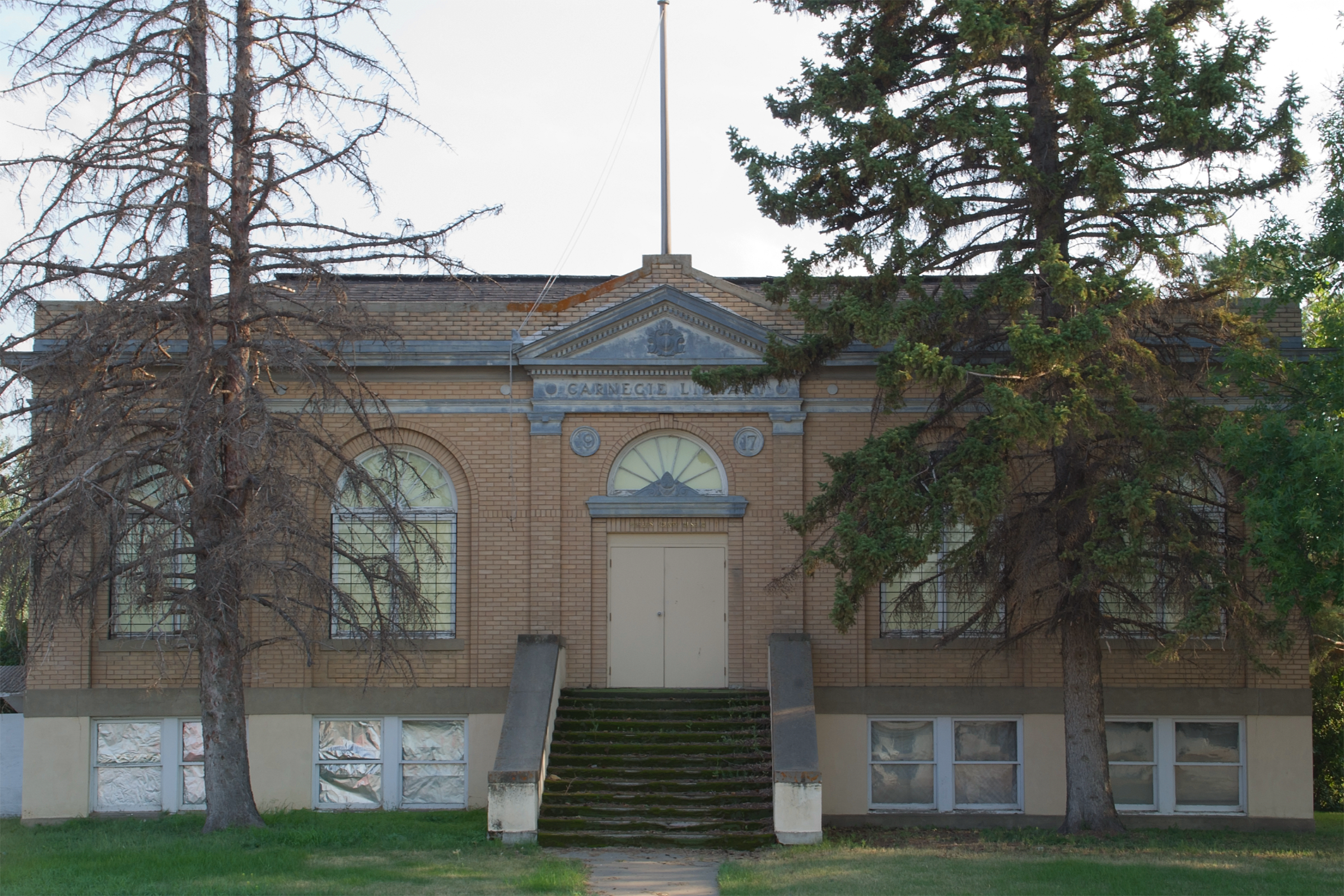

- Location within Montana Location within the United States
- Location: S. 1st St. Malta, Montana
- Coordinates: 48°21′35″N 107°52′34″W
- Area: less than one acre
- Built: 1917
- Built by: Sherry Construction Co.
- Architect: Frank F. Bossuot
- NRHP reference No.: 80002428
- Added to NRHP: August 27, 1980

Phillips County Carnegie Library is a Carnegie library on the National Register of Historic Places located in Malta, Montana. It was added to the Register on August 27, 1980. For a time, it was used as a museum interpreting local history.

It was built of tan brick on a stone foundation in 1917. It is 34 by 62 feet (10 m × 19 m) in plan, and has the words "Carnegie Library" carved in sandstone above its doorway.

The public library moved to a new location in May 1978, and the local historical society then planned to use this building as a museum.
