= Malta, Montana =

City in Montana, United States

Malta
- City
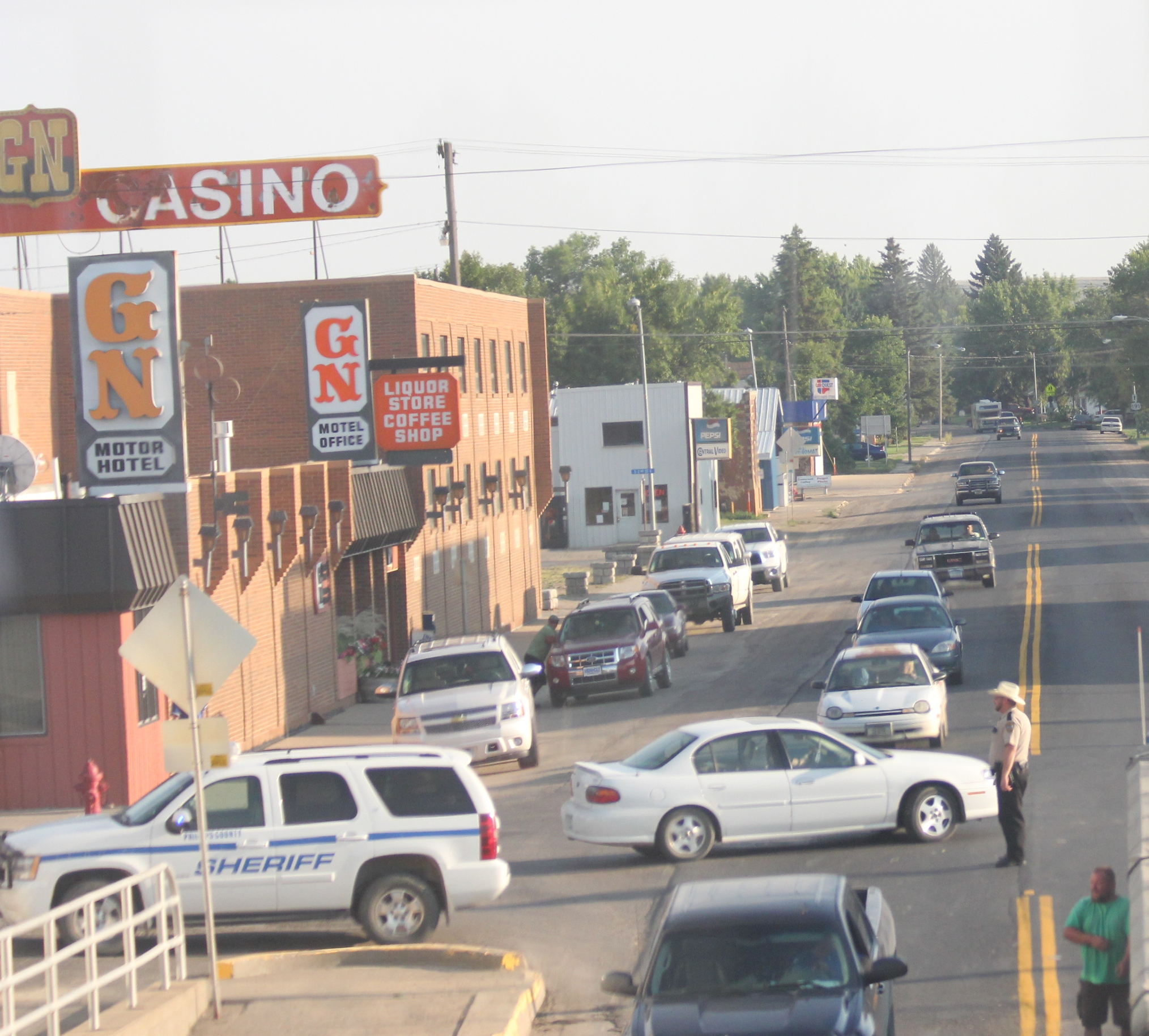
- Downtown Malta from the Empire Builder

- Location of Malta, Montana
- Coordinates: 48°21′21″N 107°52′31″W
- Country: United States
- State: Montana
- County: Phillips

Area
  - Total: 1.07 sq mi (2.78 km^{2})
  - Land: 1.07 sq mi (2.78 km^{2})
  - Water: 0 sq mi (0.00 km^{2})
- Elevation: 2,257 ft (688 m)

Population (2020)
  - Total: 1,860
  - Density: 1,732.6/sq mi (668.95/km^{2})
- Time zone: UTC-7 (Mountain (MST))
  - Summer (DST): UTC-6 (MDT)
- ZIP code: 59538
- Area code: 406
- FIPS code: 30-47425
- GNIS feature ID: 2410916
- Website: www.cityofmalta.com

Malta (/ˈmɔːltə/ MAWL-tə) is a city in and the county seat of Phillips County, Montana, United States, located at the intersection of U.S. Routes 2 and 191. The population was 1,860 at the 2020 census.

== History ==
After James Hill and his partners built the St. Paul, Minneapolis, and Manitoba railway (which in 1890 became the Great Northern Railway) across Montana's "High Line" in 1887, Malta evolved from rail siding number 54. What came to be Saco, Montana, to the east and Dodson, Montana, to the west grew from other nearby sidings. A post office was established in Malta in 1890. Its name is said to have been determined by a spin of the globe by a Great Northern official whose finger came to rest on the island of Malta in the Mediterranean Sea.

On July 3, 1901, Kid Curry (Harvey Logan), as part of Butch Cassidy's Wild Bunch, robbed a train just west of Malta, near Wagner, Montana, making off with about $40,000.

One of the best preserved dinosaurs ever discovered and one of only four that were fossilized is a 77-million-year-old Brachylophosaurus nicknamed Leonardo, unearthed north of Malta in 2000. Leonardo, together with brachylophosaurus Elvis (1994), Roberta (2003) and Peanut (2002), is on display at The Great Plains Dinosaur Museum.

== Geography ==
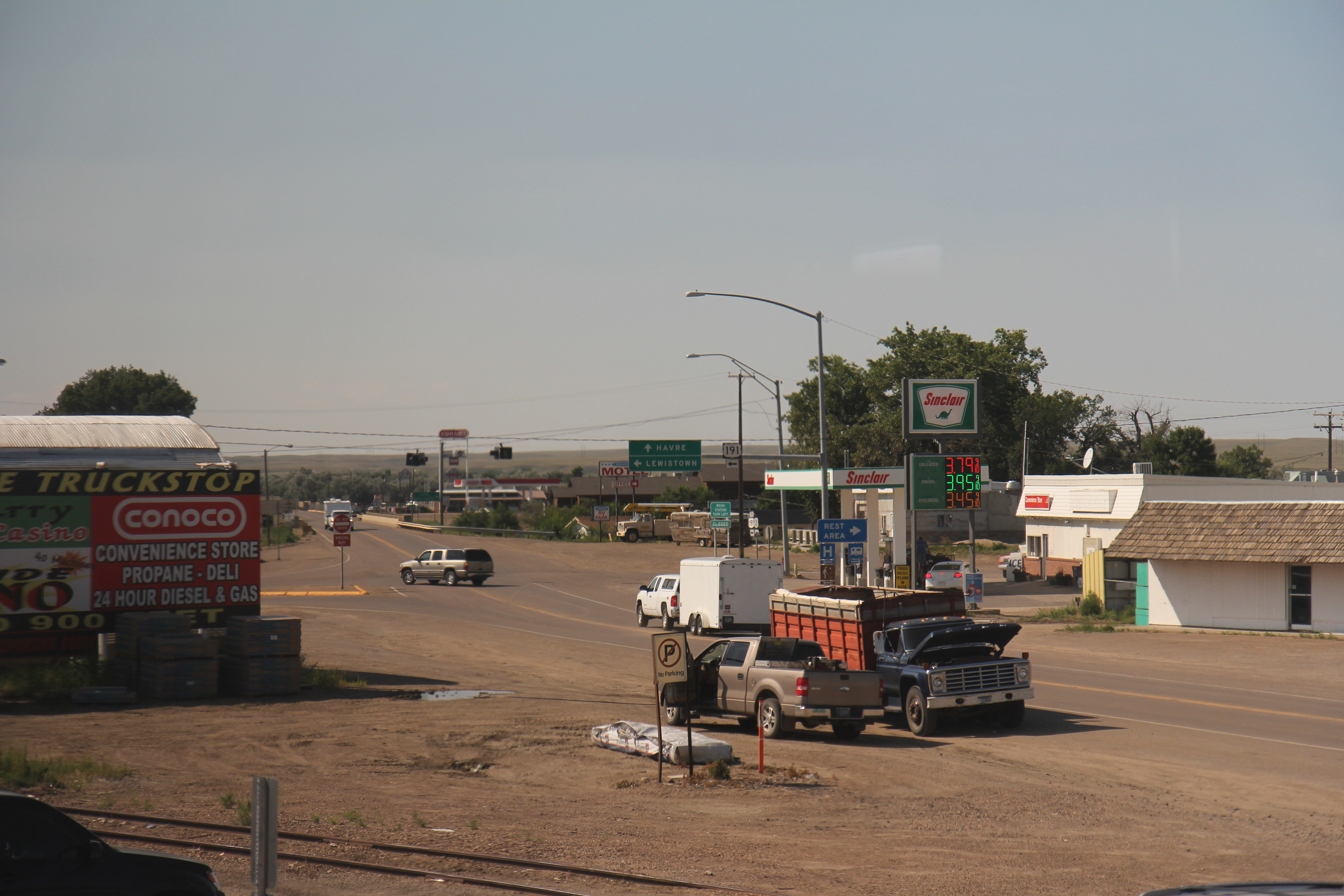
Merge of US2 and US191 in Malta

Malta is on the High Plains of Montana. The Little Rocky Mountains are located south of the town while the Milk River flows north of town. The City of Malta gets water from wells. The well water is pumped to two water tanks located at the top of a residential area known as Hillcrest. The water is treated to meet safety standards, then it enters the city water distribution system.

According to the United States Census Bureau, the city has a total area of 1.06 square miles (2.75 km^{2}), all land.

=== Climate ===
Malta experiences a semi-arid climate (Köppen BSk) with long, cold, dry winters and hot, wetter summers.

Climate data for Malta, Montana, 1991–2020 normals, extremes 1959–present
Month	Jan	Feb	Mar	Apr	May	Jun	Jul	Aug	Sep	Oct	Nov	Dec	Year
Record high °F (°C)	67 (19)	75 (24)	86 (30)	92 (33)	97 (36)	107 (42)	109 (43)	109 (43)	106 (41)	91 (33)	81 (27)	75 (24)	109 (43)
Mean maximum °F (°C)	54.8 (12.7)	56.9 (13.8)	69.0 (20.6)	80.1 (26.7)	86.8 (30.4)	94.9 (34.9)	99.3 (37.4)	99.6 (37.6)	94.5 (34.7)	82.5 (28.1)	66.9 (19.4)	55.6 (13.1)	101.9 (38.8)
Mean daily maximum °F (°C)	29.2 (−1.6)	32.8 (0.4)	44.0 (6.7)	56.4 (13.6)	66.1 (18.9)	75.4 (24.1)	85.5 (29.7)	85.2 (29.6)	73.7 (23.2)	57.9 (14.4)	42.6 (5.9)	32.1 (0.1)	56.7 (13.8)
Daily mean °F (°C)	17.5 (−8.1)	21.1 (−6.1)	31.6 (−0.2)	43.4 (6.3)	53.1 (11.7)	62.6 (17.0)	70.3 (21.3)	69.1 (20.6)	58.1 (14.5)	44.2 (6.8)	30.5 (−0.8)	20.6 (−6.3)	43.5 (6.4)
Mean daily minimum °F (°C)	5.8 (−14.6)	9.3 (−12.6)	19.3 (−7.1)	30.5 (−0.8)	40.0 (4.4)	49.9 (9.9)	55.1 (12.8)	53.0 (11.7)	42.6 (5.9)	30.4 (−0.9)	18.3 (−7.6)	9.1 (−12.7)	30.3 (−1.0)
Mean minimum °F (°C)	−24.0 (−31.1)	−15.7 (−26.5)	−4.6 (−20.3)	14.7 (−9.6)	25.3 (−3.7)	37.8 (3.2)	45.1 (7.3)	40.7 (4.8)	27.8 (−2.3)	12.5 (−10.8)	−6.2 (−21.2)	−17.1 (−27.3)	−31.5 (−35.3)
Record low °F (°C)	−51 (−46)	−45 (−43)	−35 (−37)	−6 (−21)	14 (−10)	29 (−2)	35 (2)	32 (0)	15 (−9)	−10 (−23)	−32 (−36)	−51 (−46)	−51 (−46)
Average precipitation inches (mm)	0.27 (6.9)	0.24 (6.1)	0.50 (13)	1.07 (27)	2.42 (61)	2.70 (69)	1.87 (47)	1.21 (31)	1.09 (28)	0.98 (25)	0.37 (9.4)	0.23 (5.8)	12.95 (329.2)
Average snowfall inches (cm)	6.6 (17)	6.4 (16)	4.1 (10)	2.7 (6.9)	0.6 (1.5)	0.0 (0.0)	0.0 (0.0)	0.0 (0.0)	0.0 (0.0)	1.4 (3.6)	4.8 (12)	5.6 (14)	32.2 (81)
Average precipitation days (≥ 0.01 in)	3.4	2.8	3.9	5.9	8.7	9.6	7.8	5.0	5.2	4.5	3.2	3.2	63.2
Average snowy days (≥ 0.1 in)	3.9	3.4	2.6	1.0	0.4	0.0	0.0	0.0	0.0	0.7	2.3	3.4	17.7
Source 1: NOAA
Source 2: National Weather Service

== Demographics ==
Historical population
Census	Pop.	Note	%±
1910	433		—
1920	1,427		229.6%
1930	1,342		−6.0%
1940	2,215		65.1%
1950	2,095		−5.4%
1960	2,339		11.6%
1970	2,195		−6.2%
1980	2,367		7.8%
1990	2,340		−1.1%
2000	2,120		−9.4%
2010	1,997		−5.8%
2020	1,860		−6.9%
U.S. Decennial Census

=== 2020 census ===
As of the 2020 census, Malta had a population of 1,860. The median age was 46.1 years. 21.1% of residents were under the age of 18 and 26.1% of residents were 65 years of age or older. For every 100 females there were 95.8 males, and for every 100 females age 18 and over there were 93.0 males age 18 and over.

0.0% of residents lived in urban areas, while 100.0% lived in rural areas.

There were 857 households in Malta, of which 23.8% had children under the age of 18 living in them. Of all households, 43.2% were married-couple households, 22.3% were households with a male householder and no spouse or partner present, and 28.9% were households with a female householder and no spouse or partner present. About 39.6% of all households were made up of individuals and 19.4% had someone living alone who was 65 years of age or older.

There were 1,016 housing units, of which 15.6% were vacant. The homeowner vacancy rate was 2.8% and the rental vacancy rate was 13.5%.

Racial composition as of the 2020 census
Race	Number	Percent
White	1,564	84.1%
Black or African American	1	0.1%
American Indian and Alaska Native	88	4.7%
Asian	9	0.5%
Native Hawaiian and Other Pacific Islander	0	0.0%
Some other race	46	2.5%
Two or more races	152	8.2%
Hispanic or Latino (of any race)	70	3.8%

=== Demographic estimates ===
50.9% were married, not separated, 12.9% widowed, 9.8% divorced, and 26.3% never married (29.8% in MT overall).

The average family size was 2.98.

44.7% claimed German ancestry, 21.3% Norwegian ancestry, and 16.7% Irish ancestry. 12.8% were veterans.

18.6% of residents had a Bachelor's degree or higher, compared to 33.6% in MT overall.

=== Income and poverty ===
The median income for a household in the city was $44,189 ($57,153 in MT overall), and the median income for a family was $52,974. Males had a median income of $30,117 versus $18,636 for females. About 8.4% of the population were below the poverty line (12.6% in MT overall), including 1.6% of those under age 18, 13.7% of those 18 - 64, and 3.4% of those age 65 or over.

=== 2010 census ===
As of the census of 2010, there were 1,997 people, 902 households, and 539 families residing in the city. The population density was 1,884.0 inhabitants per square mile (727.4/km^{2}). There were 1,006 housing units at an average density of 949.1 per square mile (366.4/km^{2}). The racial makeup of the city was 88.2% White, 0.1% African American, 5.5% Native American, 0.4% Asian, 0.3% from other races, and 5.7% from two or more races. Hispanic or Latino of any race were 2.0% of the population.

There were 902 households, of which 26.6% had children under the age of 18 living with them, 46.8% were married couples living together, 10.0% had a female householder with no husband present, 3.0% had a male householder with no wife present, and 40.2% were non-families. 36.6% of all households were made up of individuals, and 17.6% had someone living alone who was 65 years of age or older. The average household size was 2.16 and the average family size was 2.81.

The median age in the city was 46.8 years. 23.1% of residents were under the age of 18; 5.8% were between the ages of 18 and 24; 18.6% were from 25 to 44; 29.5% were from 45 to 64; and 23.2% were 65 years of age or older. The gender makeup of the city was 46.7% male and 53.3% female.

=== 2000 census ===
As of the census of 2000, there were 2,120 people, 907 households, and 565 families residing in the city. The population density was 2,006.1 inhabitants per square mile (774.6/km^{2}). There were 1,067 housing units at an average density of 1,009.7 per square mile (389.8/km^{2}). The racial makeup of the city was 92.83% White, 0.05% African American, 4.67% Native American, 0.24% Asian, 0.05% Pacific Islander, 0.19% from other races, and 1.98% from two or more races. Hispanic or Latino of any race were 1.04% of the population.

There were 907 households, out of which 28.3% had children under the age of 18 living with them, 49.9% were married couples living together, 9.7% had a female householder with no husband present, and 37.6% were non-families. 33.7% of all households were made up of individuals, and 18.1% had someone living alone who was 65 years of age or older. The average household size was 2.27 and the average family size was 2.90.

In the city, the population was spread out, with 24.7% under the age of 18, 5.8% from 18 to 24, 23.1% from 25 to 44, 24.3% from 45 to 64, and 22.1% who were 65 years of age or older. The median age was 43 years. For every 100 females there were 93.1 males. For every 100 females age 18 and over, there were 87.0 males.

The median income for a household in the city was $31,212, and the median income for a family was $41,422. Males had a median income of $30,117 versus $18,636 for females. The per capita income for the city was $16,405. About 8.8% of families and 13.1% of the population were below the poverty line, including 14.4% of those under age 18 and 8.8% of those age 65 or over.

== Arts and culture ==
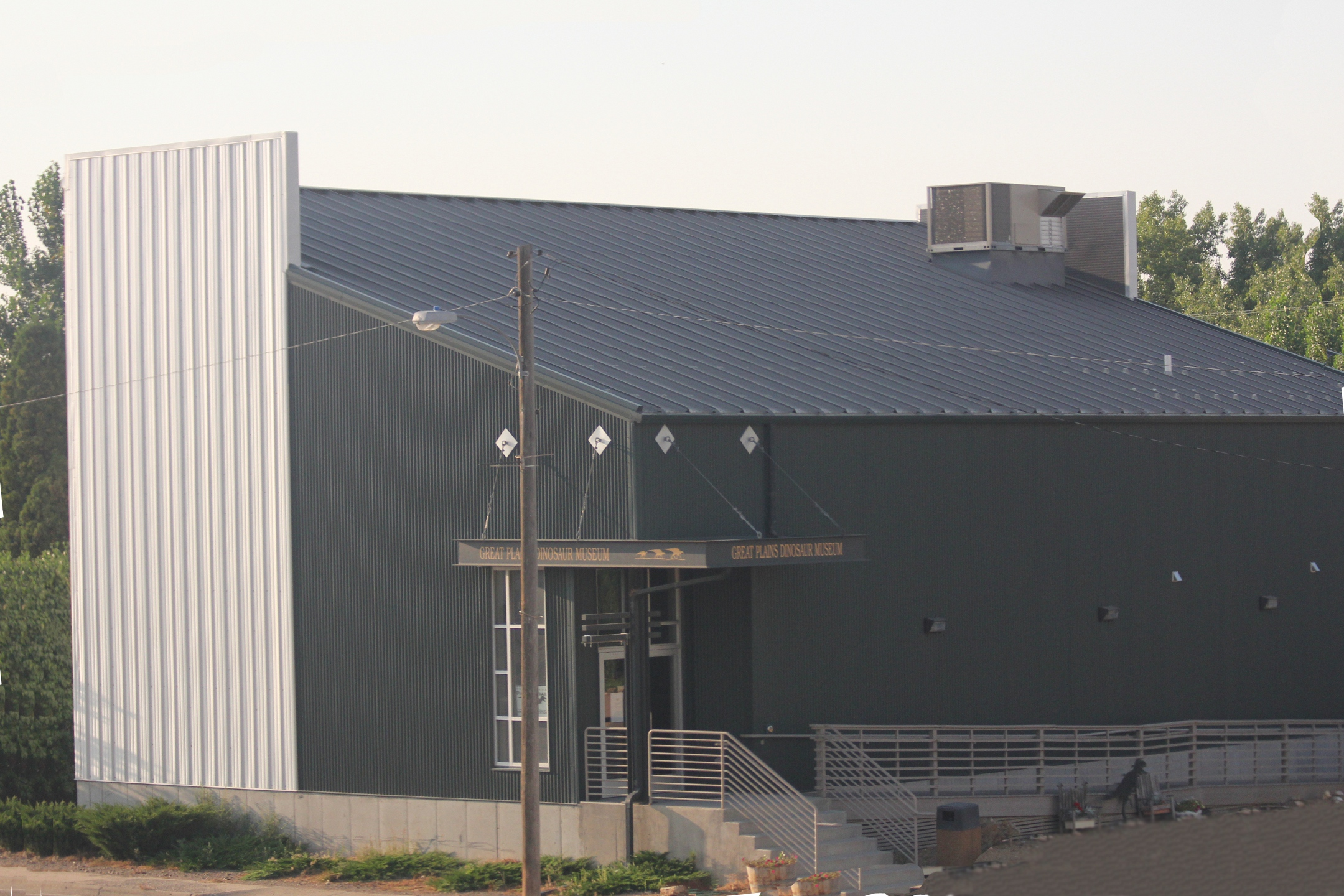
The Great Plains Dinosaur Museum in Malta

Two stops on The Montana Dinosaur Trail are located in Malta. They are: the Great Plains Dinosaur Museum and Field Station and the Phillips County Museum.

The Great Plains museum is also home to the Judith River Dinosaur Institute. The Institute provides the opportunity for others to participate in an educational dinosaur dig or take a fossil preparation course. In June the museum has the Montana Dinosaur Festival. The Festival includes adult and children's activities focused around paleontology.

The Phillips County Museum has local history information including artifacts from Native American culture, cowboys and outlaws, and pioneer life. On site is also the H.G. Robinson House and Gardens. The house is one of the earliest homes in Malta.

The Phillips County Carnegie Library is the public library in Malta. The building is on the National Register of Historic Places.

== Government ==
Malta has a mayor and city council. There are two wards, each with two council members. Incumbent mayor John Demarais won the November 2025 election against three other candidates. He was unopposed in 2021. He won his first term in 2017 after Mayor Shyla Jones did not seek a third term.

== Education ==
Malta Public Schools educates students from kindergarten through 12th grade. Malta High School's team name is the Mustangs/M-Ettes.

== Infrastructure ==
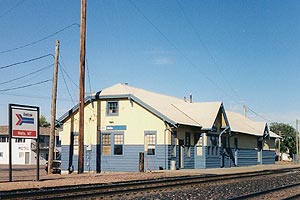
Amtrak station

U.S. Route 2 travels through town from east to west while U.S. Route 191 travels north to south.

Amtrak's Empire Builder, running between Chicago and Seattle/Portland, stops daily in Malta at Malta station.

The Malta Airport is a public use airport.

== Media ==
The Phillips County News is a weekly local newspaper. They provide a printed paper as well as news online.

The radio station KMMR FM 100.1 (Country music) is licensed in Malta.

== Notable people ==
- Greg Hertz, served in Montana Congress
- Karl Ohs, 28th Lieutenant Governor of the state of Montana
