= Carnegie Library Building (Athens, Georgia) =

United States historic place

- U.S. National Register of Historic Places
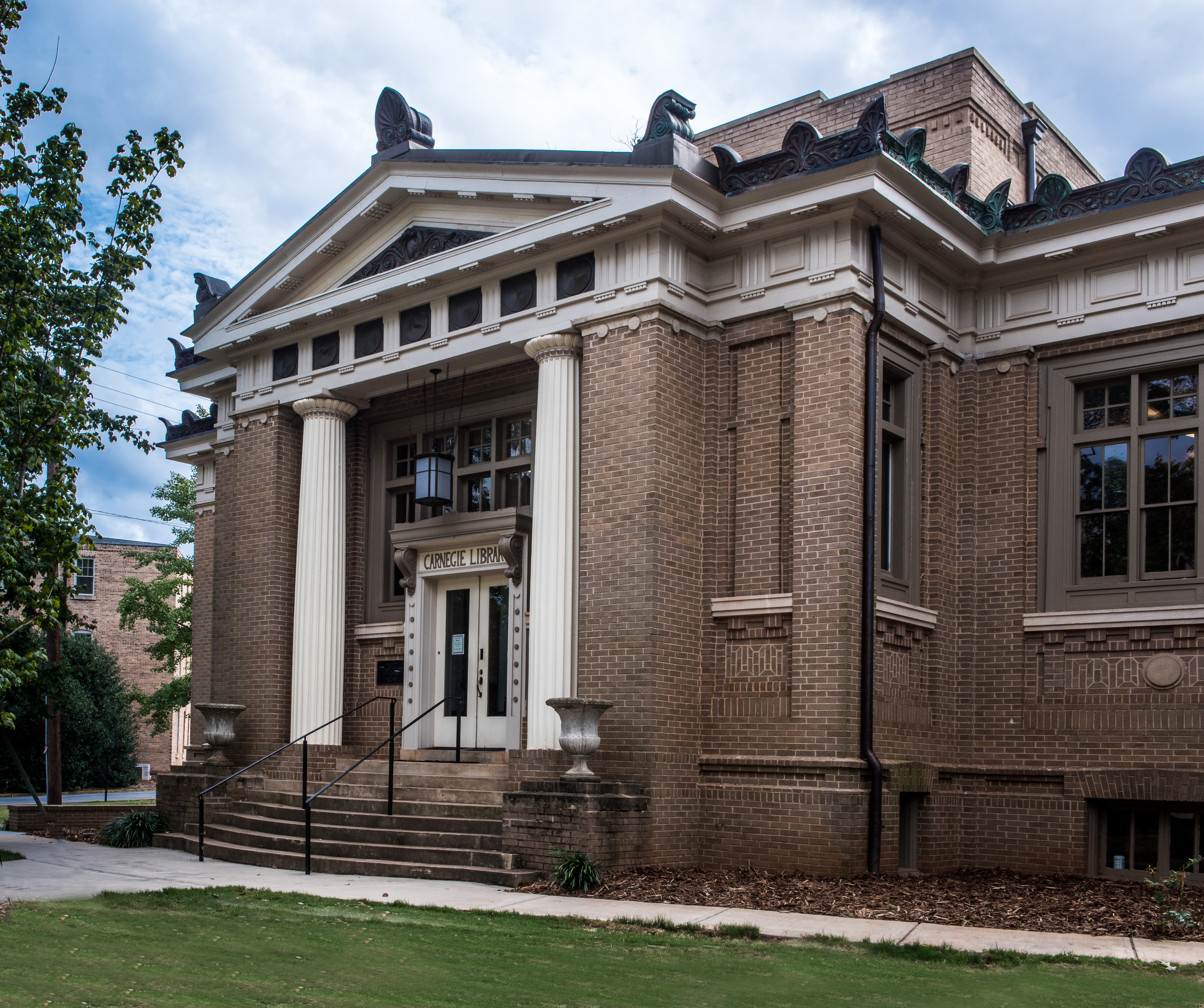
- Carnegie Library Building, front View

- Location within Georgia Location within the United States
- Location: Athens, Georgia
- Coordinates: 33°57′49.6044″N 83°24′5.9796″W
- Built: 1900
- Architectural style: Antebellum revival
- NRHP reference No.: 75000577
- Added to NRHP: November 11, 1975

The Carnegie Library Building is a historic building in Athens, Georgia. It was one of many such libraries donated by Andrew Carnegie which were named Carnegie Library after him. It was designed as an academic library to serve a teaching college, the State Normal School (Athens, Georgia). Funds were donated on March 5, 1905, and construction was completed in 1910.

== History ==
In 1932 the University of Georgia's Department of Education assumed control of training for teachers in the state. The normal school was taken over by the University of Georgia and became known as Coordinate College. In 1953, the normal school campus was sold to the U.S. government for use as the Navy Supply Corps School. The library was used as the Navy Supply Corps Museum.

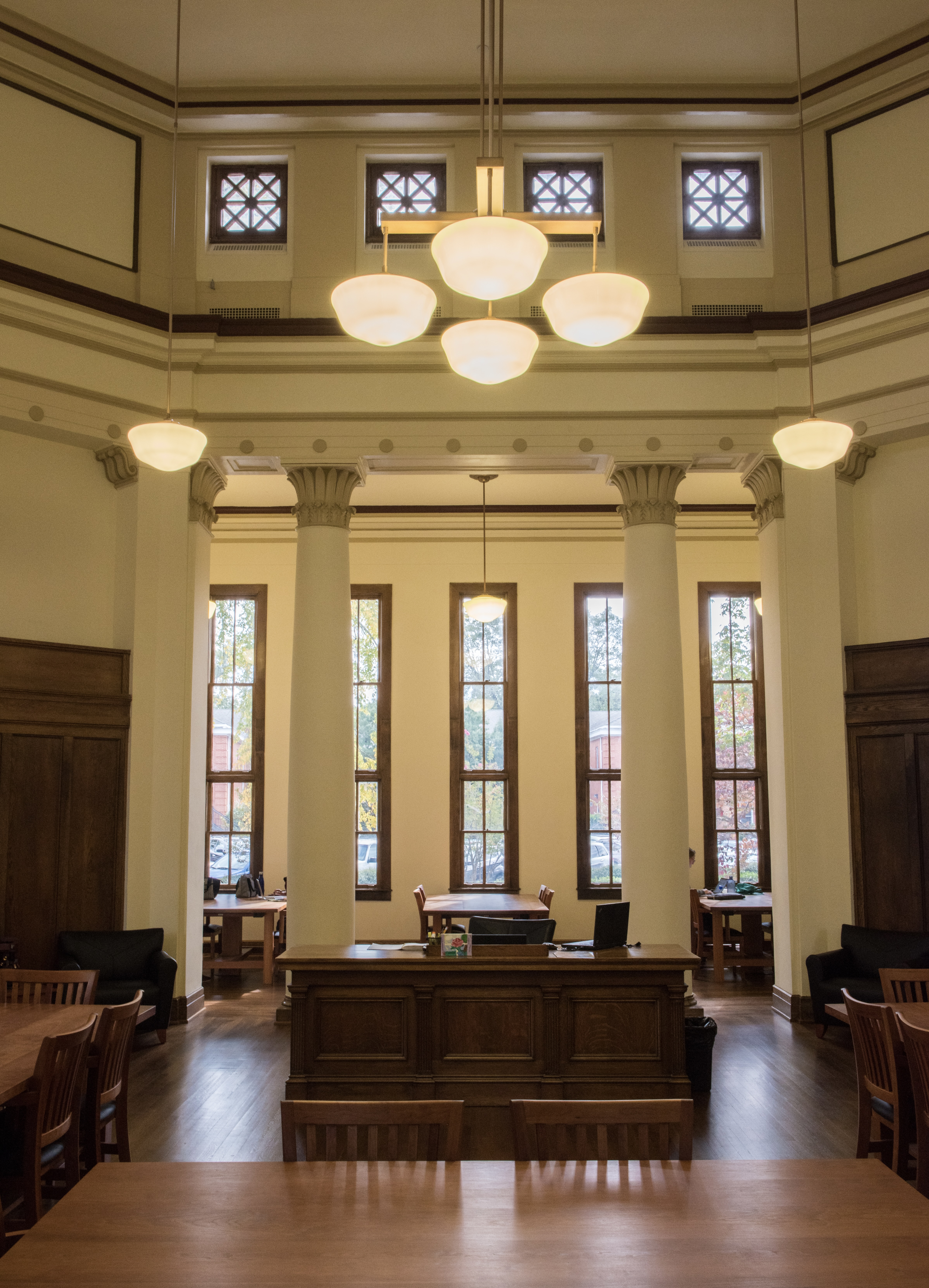
Carnegie Library Building (Athens, Georgia)

On November 11, 1975, it was added to the U.S. National Register of Historic Places. The University of Georgia has renovated the building, which now houses a part of the university libraries. It has been given the name, Carnegie Library Learning Center.

== Services ==
The Carnegie Library primarily serves as an electronic library. Wi-fi access is available to students and faculty with a UGA login. The library provides computer workstations as well as printer and scanner access. It also provides “Bulldog Bikes” for students to check out for traveling around campus.

The Carnegie Library does not have its own print collection. However, students and faculty are allowed to drop off and pick up books and periodicals from the library's location.

== Hours of operation ==
The Carnegie Library Learning Center is open during the regular academic year on Mondays through Thursdays from 9am to 10 pm and Sundays from 2 pm to 10 pm, and is closed on Fridays and holidays. Summer semester hours are Mondays through Fridays from 9am to 6pm.
