= Carnegie Library (Roswell, New Mexico) =

Building in New Mexico, US

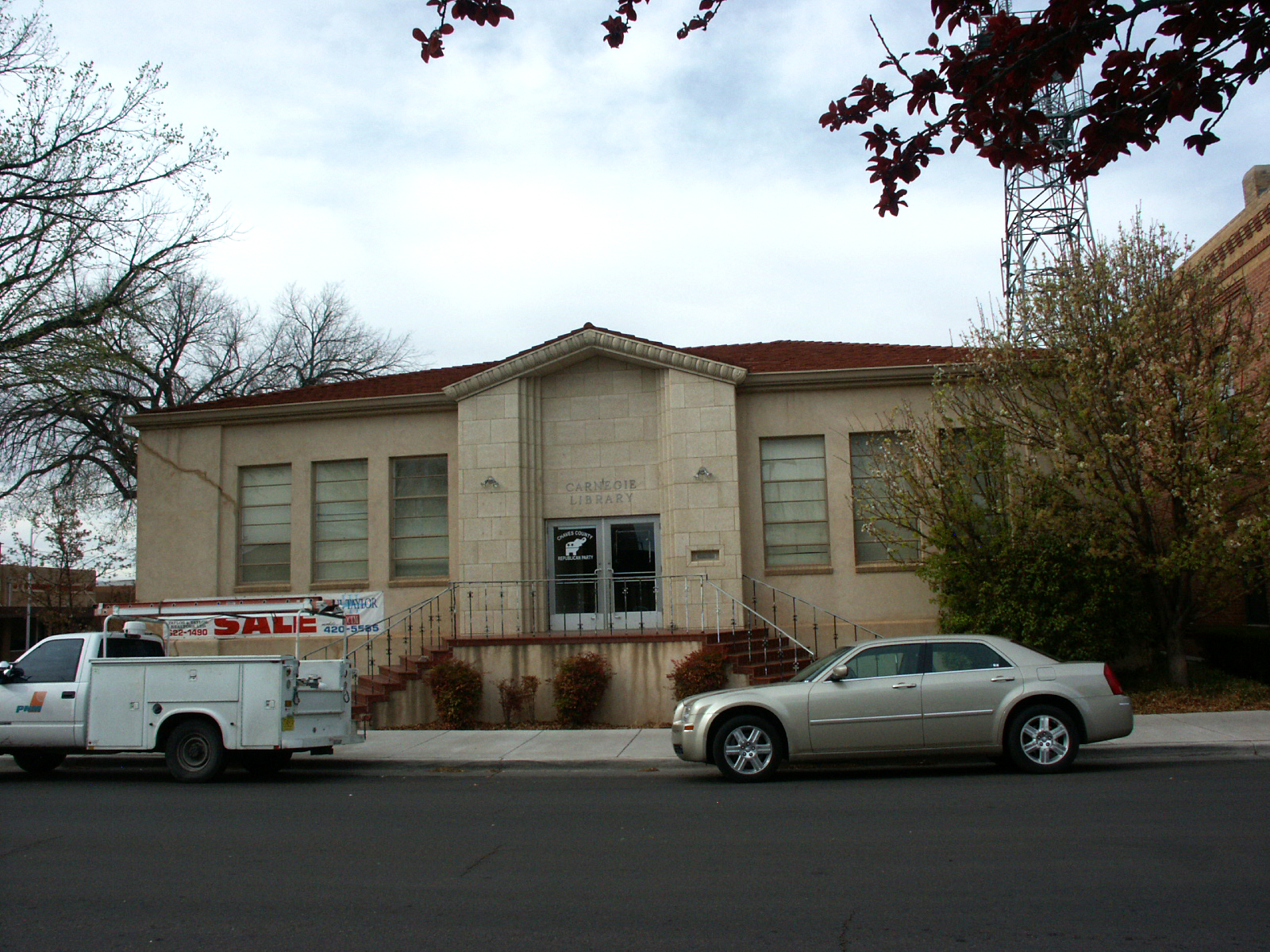
- The former Carnegie Library in 2006

General information
- Address: 123 W 3rd St.
- Town or city: Roswell, New Mexico
- Coordinates: 33.395516°N 104.524312°W

The Carnegie Library in Roswell, New Mexico, is located at the northeast corner of West Third Street and North Richardson Street. Three Carnegie libraries were built in New Mexico, in Las Vegas; Raton; and Roswell. The Raton library was demolished, the Roswell library is a vacant office building, and the Las Vegas library is still in use.

== Origin ==
The Library's origin dates back to 1895, when a group of local women formed the Roswell Women's Club to obtain reading materials for themselves and their families. As their collection grew, the Women's Club opened a reading room in 1897. In 1900, the club began the application process to obtain a grant to build a library from philanthropist Andrew Carnegie.

Two basic grant requirements were free title to the construction site and a maintenance fund equaling 10 percent of the grant. The club was thwarted by Carnegie's reluctance to consider applications from women. In 1902, a mill levy was passed by the male voters of the town to fund the library's maintenance. In 1904, a lot was purchased for $700 as a result of fund raising efforts by the Women's Club. In addition to this grant, the library received funding from James Hagerman, an investor in the railroad and irrigation industries in the Pecos Valley. Willa Skipworth was one of the first librarians, widow of Dr. Edwin Skipworth, a prominent doctor in the area. She went on to hold that position for fifteen years. The library operated on the maintenance funds until 1940 when a bond issue of $30,000 was passed by Roswell voters to remodel the library. Another bond issue for $50,000 was approved in 1950. All remodeling was completed by 1952, adding 5,100 square feet to the library.

== Recent history ==
By 1960, the population of Roswell had grown to 30,000. Due to its small size, the Carnegie library quickly succumbed to pressures of overcrowding by patrons and limited space for collections. Failed bond issues for a new library in Roswell were proposed in 1968 and 1970. It wasn't until 1976 that a bond issue was successfully passed by Roswell voters. In 1978, the new library was built and opened, and the Roswell Carnegie Library was closed.

The original Carnegie Library building was most recently renovated in 1992 to serve as office space. The building's exterior, original floors, and large windows help to preserve the history of the building. The privately owned building is currently being sold through an auction that closes February 28, 2014.

The library's new location at 301 N. Pennsylvania is a 22,000 sq.ft. facility that houses over 150,000 items, including books, cds, DVDs, audio books, magazines, and e-books. As a full service library, it offers computer access, online databases, and wireless Internet access. It also has a large children's area with a diverse collection and many scheduled activities. The library has grown and continues to serve the Roswell community long after the original Carnegie facility outlived its usefulness.
