= Strandburg, South Dakota =

- Town
- Location in Grant County and the state of South Dakota
- Coordinates: 45°02′39″N 96°45′28″W
- Country: United States
- State: South Dakota
- County: Grant
- Incorporated: 1914

Area
  - Total: 0.073 sq mi (0.19 km^{2})
  - Land: 0.073 sq mi (0.19 km^{2})
  - Water: 0 sq mi (0.00 km^{2})
- Elevation: 1,677 ft (511 m)

Population (2020)
  - Total: 63
  - Density: 845/sq mi (326.2/km^{2})
- Time zone: UTC-6 (Central (CST))
  - Summer (DST): UTC-5 (CDT)
- ZIP code: 57265
- Area code: 605
- FIPS code: 46-61980
- GNIS feature ID: 1267594

Strandburg is a town in southern Grant County, South Dakota, United States. The population was 63 at the 2020 census. Its name is derived from the town's founder, the Swedish John Strandburg.

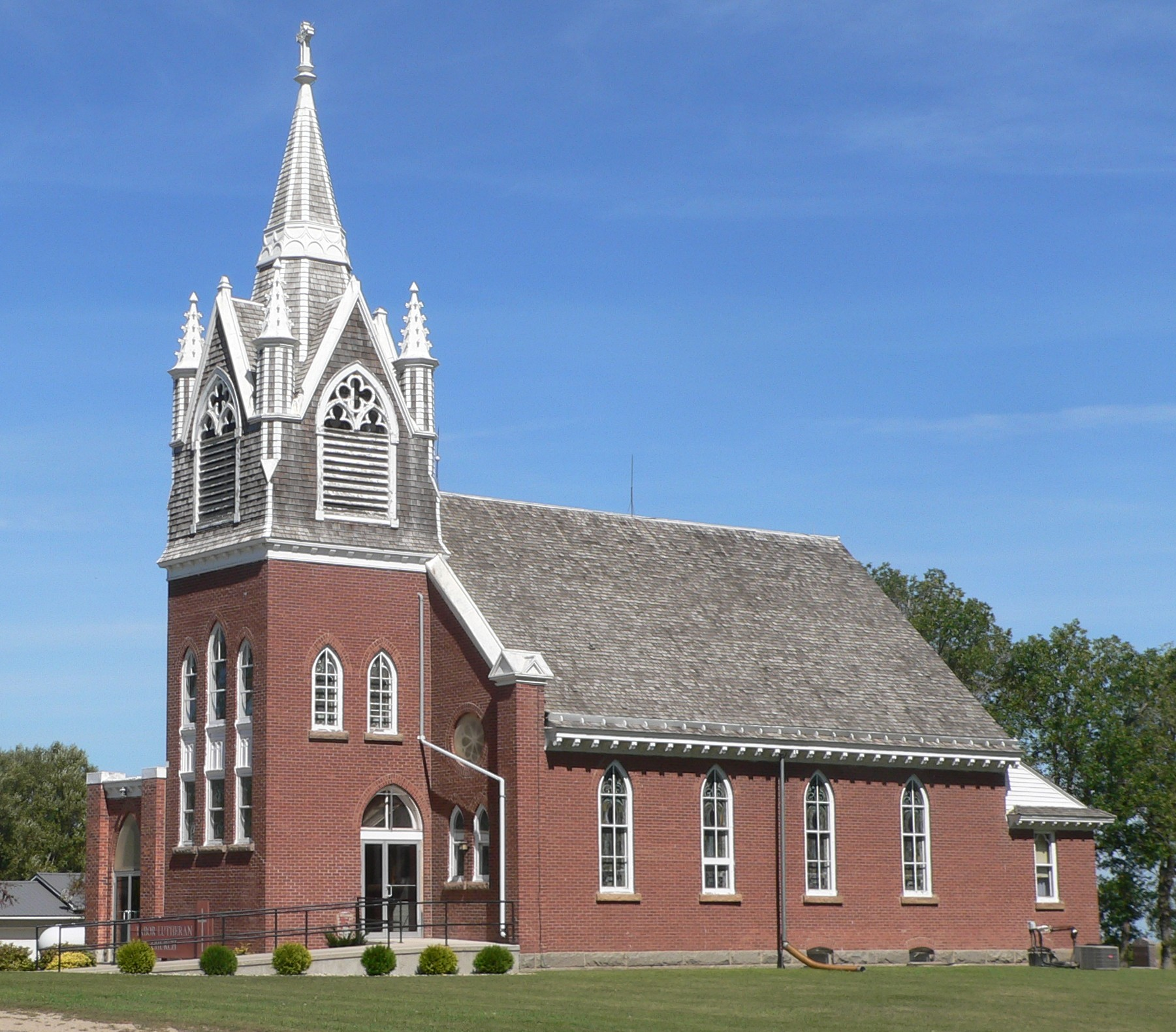
The Swedish Lutheran Church of Strandburg (Tabor Church), September 2017

== Geography ==
According to the United States Census Bureau, the town has a total area of 0.08 square miles (0.21 km^{2}), all land.

== Demographics ==
Historical population
Census	Pop.	Note	%±
1920	169		—
1930	113		−33.1%
1940	177		56.6%
1950	144		−18.6%
1960	105		−27.1%
1970	98		−6.7%
1980	79		−19.4%
1990	74		−6.3%
2000	69		−6.8%
2010	72		4.3%
2020	63		−12.5%
U.S. Decennial Census

=== 2010 census ===
As of the census of 2010, there were 72 people, 27 households, and 17 families residing in the town. The population density was 900.0 inhabitants per square mile (347.5/km^{2}). There were 36 housing units at an average density of 450.0 per square mile (173.7/km^{2}). The racial makeup of the town was 95.8% White and 4.2% Native American.

There were 27 households, of which 29.6% had children under the age of 18 living with them, 51.9% were married couples living together, 3.7% had a female householder with no husband present, 7.4% had a male householder with no wife present, and 37.0% were non-families. 37.0% of all households were made up of individuals, and 14.8% had someone living alone who was 65 years of age or older. The average household size was 2.67 and the average family size was 3.41.

The median age in the town was 37 years. 36.1% of residents were under the age of 18; 6.9% were between the ages of 18 and 24; 19.4% were from 25 to 44; 26.4% were from 45 to 64; and 11.1% were 65 years of age or older. The gender makeup of the town was 58.3% male and 41.7% female.

=== 2000 census ===
As of the census of 2000, there were 69 people, 28 households, and 16 families residing in the town. The population density was 901.2 inhabitants per square mile (348.0/km^{2}). There were 33 housing units at an average density of 431.0 per square mile (166.4/km^{2}). The racial makeup of the town was 97.10% White, and 2.90% from two or more races.

There were 28 households, out of which 32.1% had children under the age of 18 living with them, 57.1% were married couples living together, and 39.3% were non-families. 35.7% of all households were made up of individuals, and 32.1% had someone living alone who was 65 years of age or older. The average household size was 2.46 and the average family size was 3.35.

In the town, the population was spread out, with 29.0% under the age of 18, 8.7% from 18 to 24, 27.5% from 25 to 44, 10.1% from 45 to 64, and 24.6% who were 65 years of age or older. The median age was 34 years. For every 100 females, there were 122.6 males. For every 100 females age 18 and over, there were 104.2 males.

The median income for a household in the town was $36,563, and the median income for a family was $47,500. Males had a median income of $32,188 versus $18,125 for females. The per capita income for the town was $17,609. None of the population or families were below the poverty line.

== See also ==
- List of towns in South Dakota
