= Carnegie Free Public Library (Sioux Falls, South Dakota) =

- U.S. National Register of Historic Places
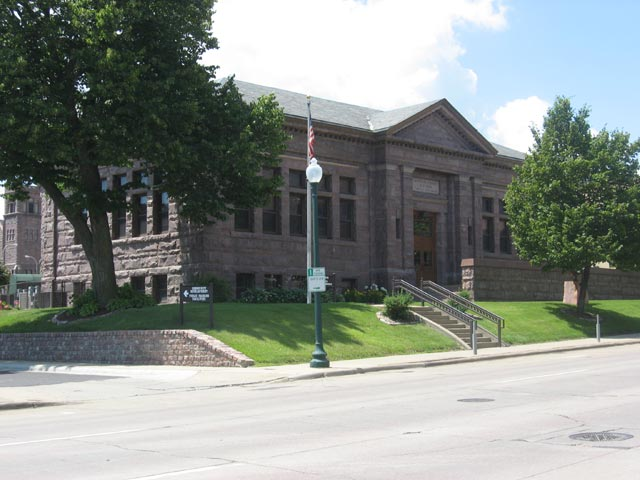

- Location within South Dakota Location within the United States
- Location: 235 West 10th Street, Sioux Falls, South Dakota
- Coordinates: 43°49′30″N 96°42′36″W
- Area: 0.3 acres (0.12 ha)
- Built: 1903
- Architect: Schwartz, Joseph
- NRHP reference No.: 73001750
- Added to NRHP: March 14, 1973

The Carnegie Free Public Library, also known as the Carnegie Town Hall, is a historic Carnegie library located at 235 W. 10th St. in Sioux Falls, South Dakota. The library was built in 1903 through a $25,000 grant from the Carnegie Foundation. Architect Joseph Schwartz designed the building, a Romanesque Revival structure with Neoclassical influences. The library was built from locally quarried quartzite, a popular local building material at the turn of the century. While the building's massive form and rough-hewn stone exterior are Romanesque, it features a Greek pediment above the entrance supported by four pilasters on either side of the doorway. The building represents the only use of Classical details in a quartzite building in Sioux Falls.

The library relocated to a larger building in 1972. In 1973, the building was listed on the National Register of Historic Places. The Civic Fine Arts Association ran an art museum in the building from 1973 until 1999. In 2001, the building was renovated and the Sioux Falls City Council occupied it as its council chambers.
