= Carnegie Public Library (Big Timber, Montana) =

- U.S. National Register of Historic Places
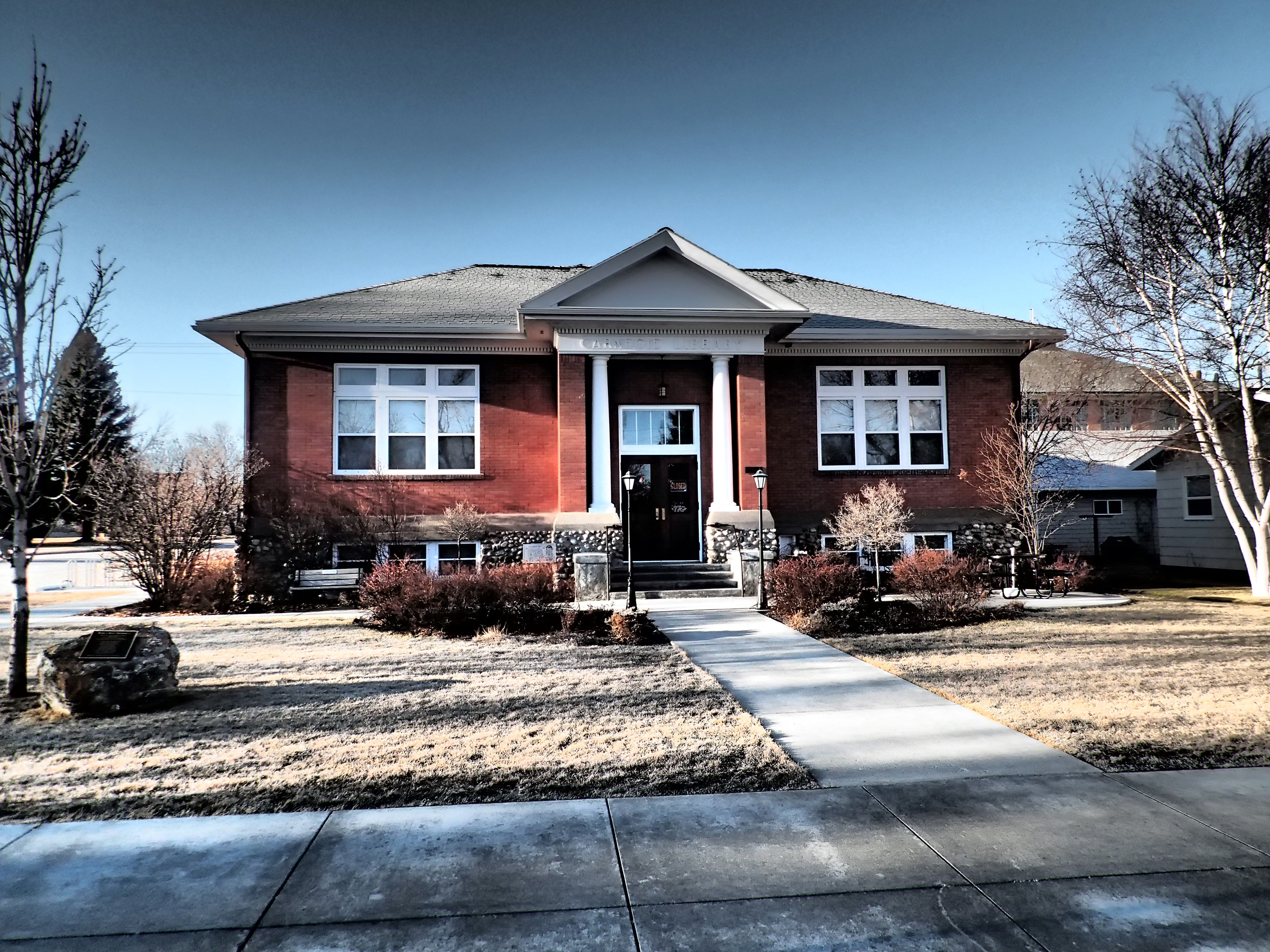
- Carnegie Public Library, January 2015

- Location within Montana Location within the United States
- Location: 314 McLeod Street; Big Timber, Montana; United States
- Coordinates: 45°49′57″N 109°57′7″W
- Area: less than one acre
- Built: 1913
- Built by: Gagnon & Co.
- Architect: Link and Haire
- Architectural style: Classical Revival
- NRHP reference No.: 02000725
- Added to NRHP: July 11, 2002

The Carnegie Public Library at 314 McLeod Street (S-298) in Big Timber, Montana, United States, is a Carnegie library which was built in 1913. It has also been known as Big Timber Carnegie Library. It was listed on the National Register of Historic Places in 2002.

It was designed by architects Link & Haire in Classical Revival style.

== See also ==
- Carnegie Public Library, located in Huntington, West Virginia
- List of Carnegie libraries in Montana
- National Register of Historic Places listings in Sweet Grass County, Montana
