= Clarinda Carnegie Library =

Museum in Iowa, U.S.

- U.S. National Register of Historic Places
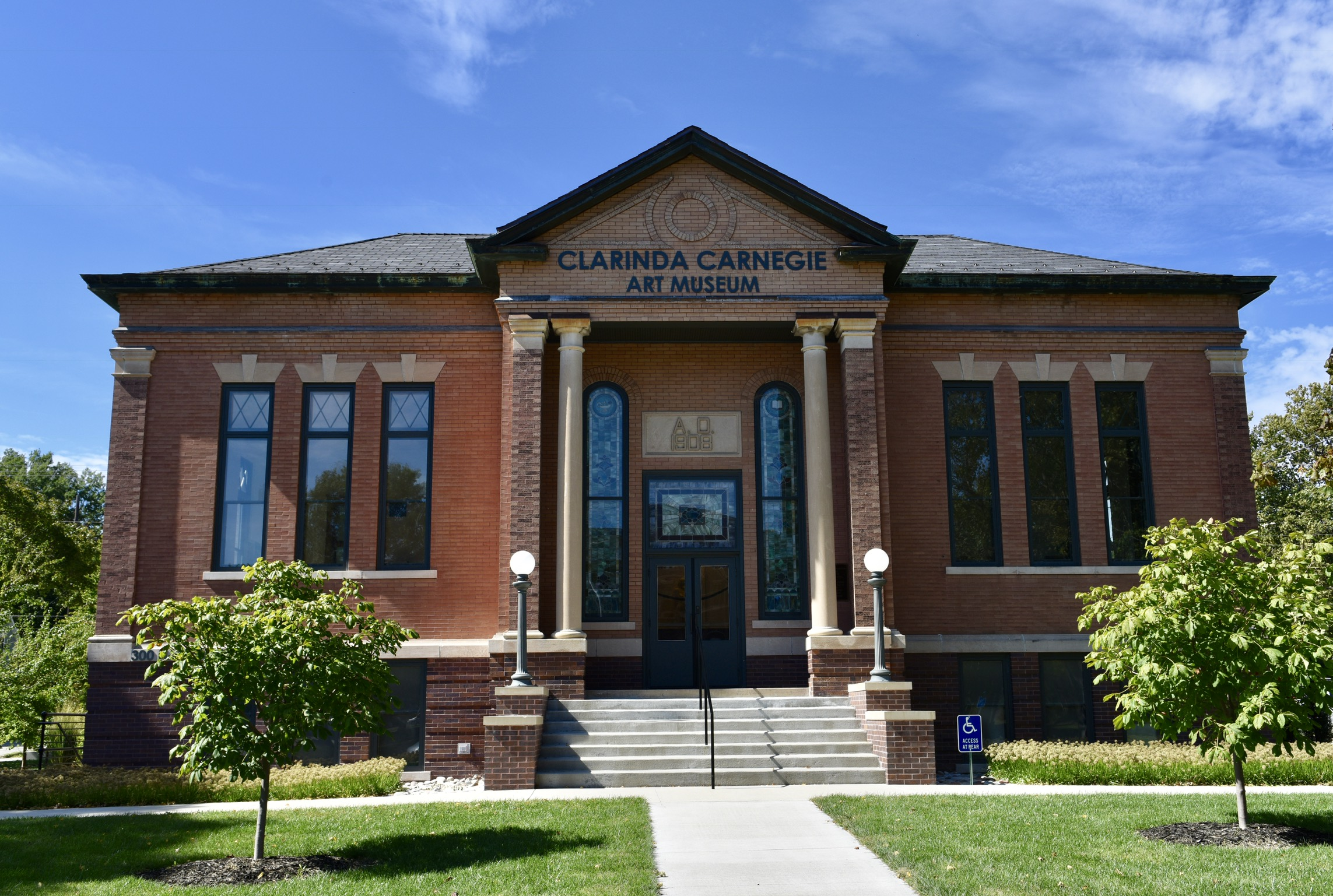

- Location within Iowa Location within the United States
- Location: 300 N. 16th St. Clarinda, Iowa
- Coordinates: 40°44′26.1″N 95°02′17.9″W
- Area: less than one acre
- Built: 1909
- Architect: W.W. Welch
- Architectural style: Neoclassical
- NRHP reference No.: 13001078
- Added to NRHP: January 15, 2014

The Clarinda Carnegie Library, now known as the Clarinda Carnegie Art Museum, is a historic building located in Clarinda, Iowa, United States. The Clarinda Public Library was organized in 1905. The library board applied for a grant from the Carnegie Corporation of New York for $15,000 on February 21, 1907. W.W. Welch was the architect of the Carnegie library building that was dedicated on April 15, 1909. In time the building became too small. The Lied Foundation of Las Vegas donated $1 million towards a new facility, and a special election held in October 2002 allowed the city to borrow the same amount for a new building. Groundbreaking for the new building took place on May 28, 2003, and the new Lied Public Library was opened on October 11, 2004. The old library building has been transformed into an art museum, and it was listed on the National Register of Historic Places in 2014.
