= Carnegie Free Library (Sturgeon Bay, Wisconsin) =

- U.S. National Register of Historic Places
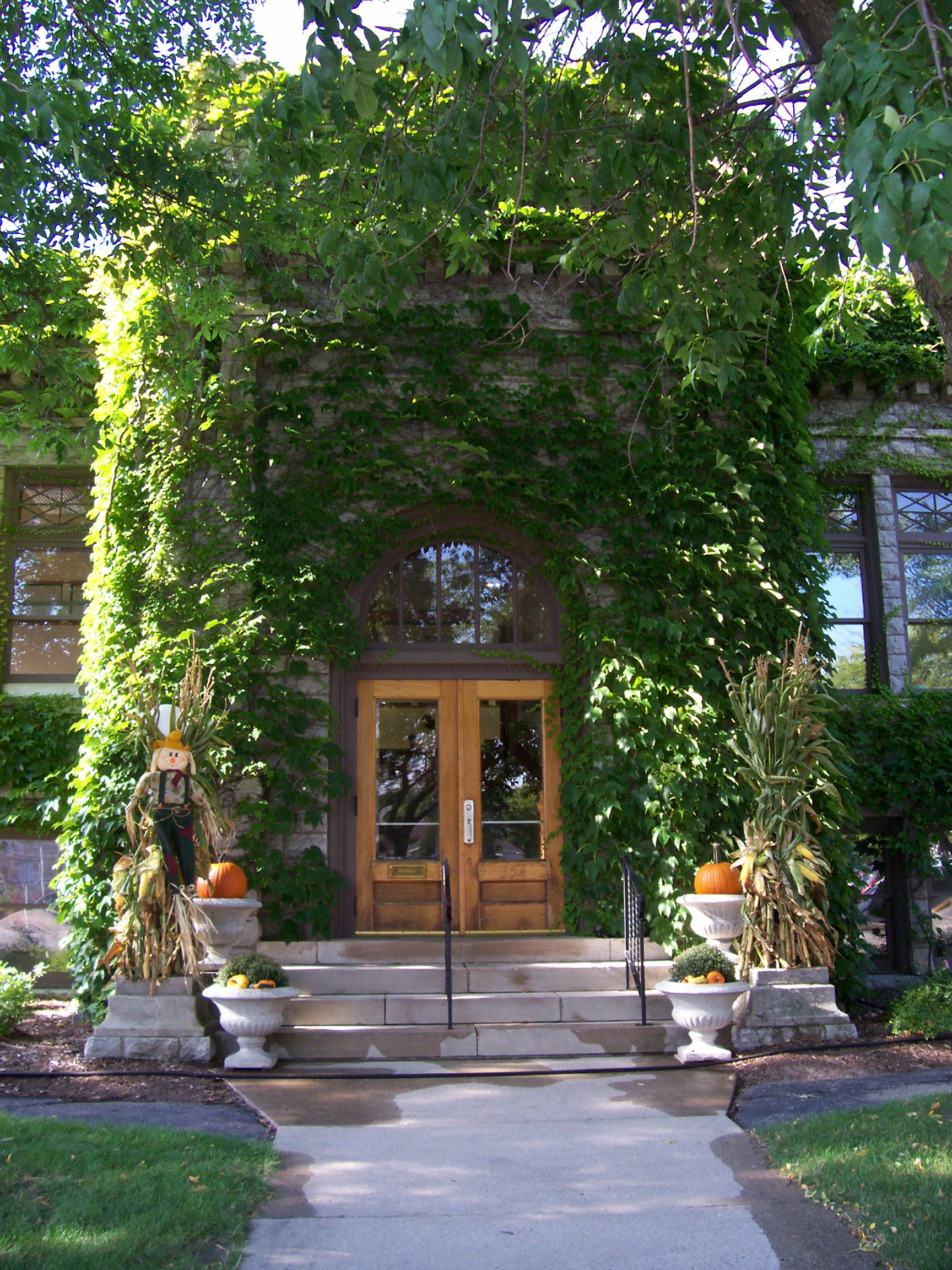
- Carnegie Free Library
- Location: 354 Michigan St. Sturgeon Bay, Wisconsin
- Coordinates: 44.83485°N 87.37563°W
- Built: 1913
- Architect: Fred D. Crandall
- Architectural style: Classical Revival
- NRHP reference No.: 88003069
- Added to NRHP: December 29, 1988

The Carnegie Free Library was added to the National Register of Historic Places in 1988.

== History ==
The library was built with a gift of $12,500 from Andrew Carnegie. It was largely built out of limestone.
