= Carnegie Library (Corbin, Kentucky) =

- U.S. National Register of Historic Places
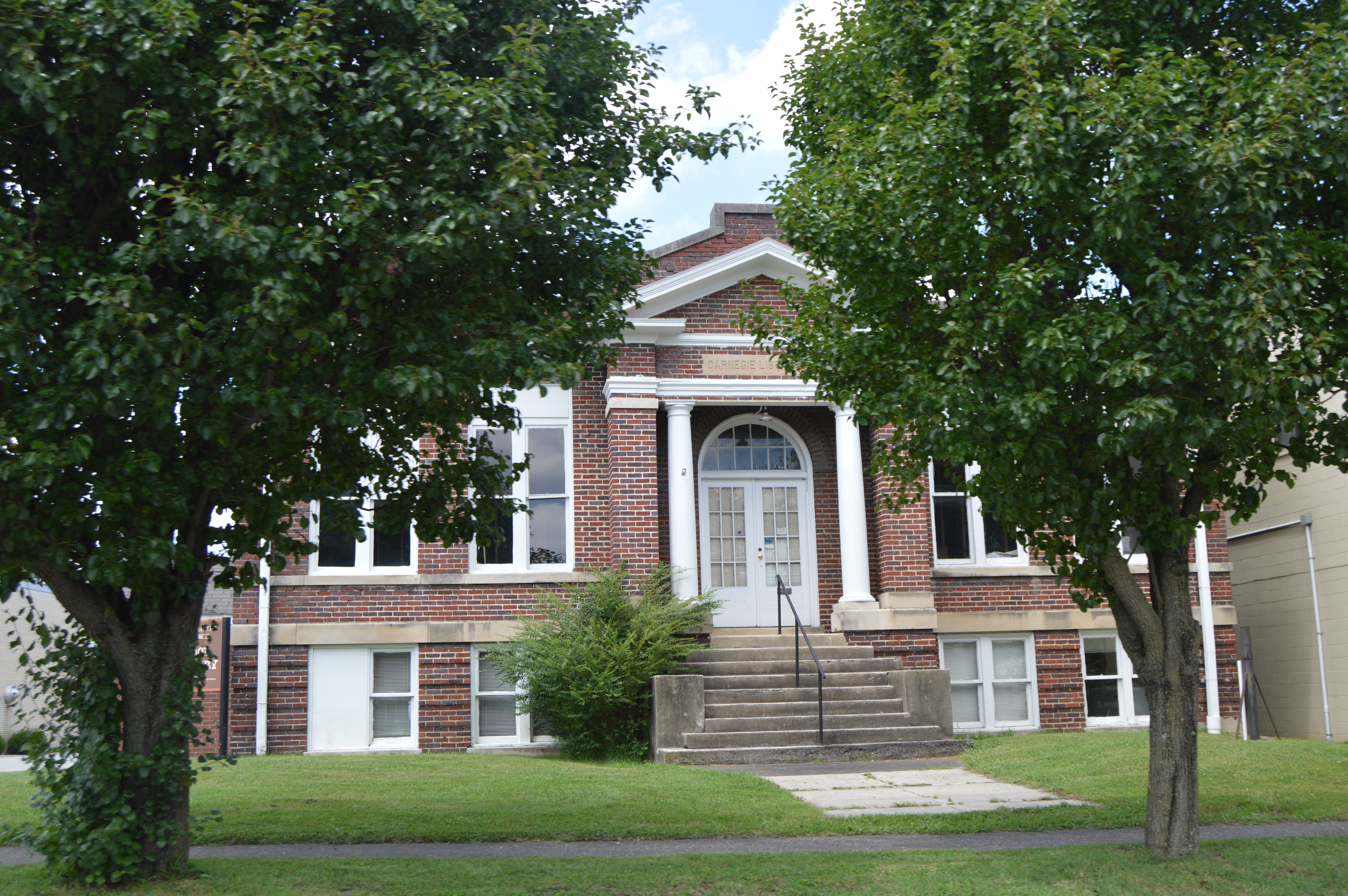
- Front of the library

- Location within Kentucky Location within the United States
- Location: E. Center Street, Corbin, Kentucky
- Coordinates: 36°56′59″N 84°5′38″W
- Area: 0.1 acres (0.040 ha)
- Built: 1916
- Built by: F. B. Heath
- Architectural style: Classical Revival
- MPS: Corbin MRA
- NRHP reference No.: 86000603
- Added to NRHP: March 28, 1986

The Carnegie Library in Corbin, Kentucky, United States, is a building from 1916. It was listed on the National Register of Historic Places in 1986.

It is a five-bay two-story building with a stepped brick parapet.

It has also served as the WYGO radio station.
