= Revillo, South Dakota =

- Town
- Location in Grant County and the state of South Dakota
- Coordinates: 45°00′55″N 96°34′16″W
- Country: United States
- State: South Dakota
- County: Grant
- Incorporated: 1900

Area
  - Total: 0.17 sq mi (0.43 km^{2})
  - Land: 0.17 sq mi (0.43 km^{2})
  - Water: 0 sq mi (0.00 km^{2})
- Elevation: 1,201 ft (366 m)

Population (2020)
  - Total: 99
  - Density: 592.1/sq mi (228.62/km^{2})
- Time zone: UTC-6 (Central (CST))
  - Summer (DST): UTC-5 (CDT)
- ZIP code: 57259
- Area code: 605
- FIPS code: 46-54220
- GNIS feature ID: 1267550

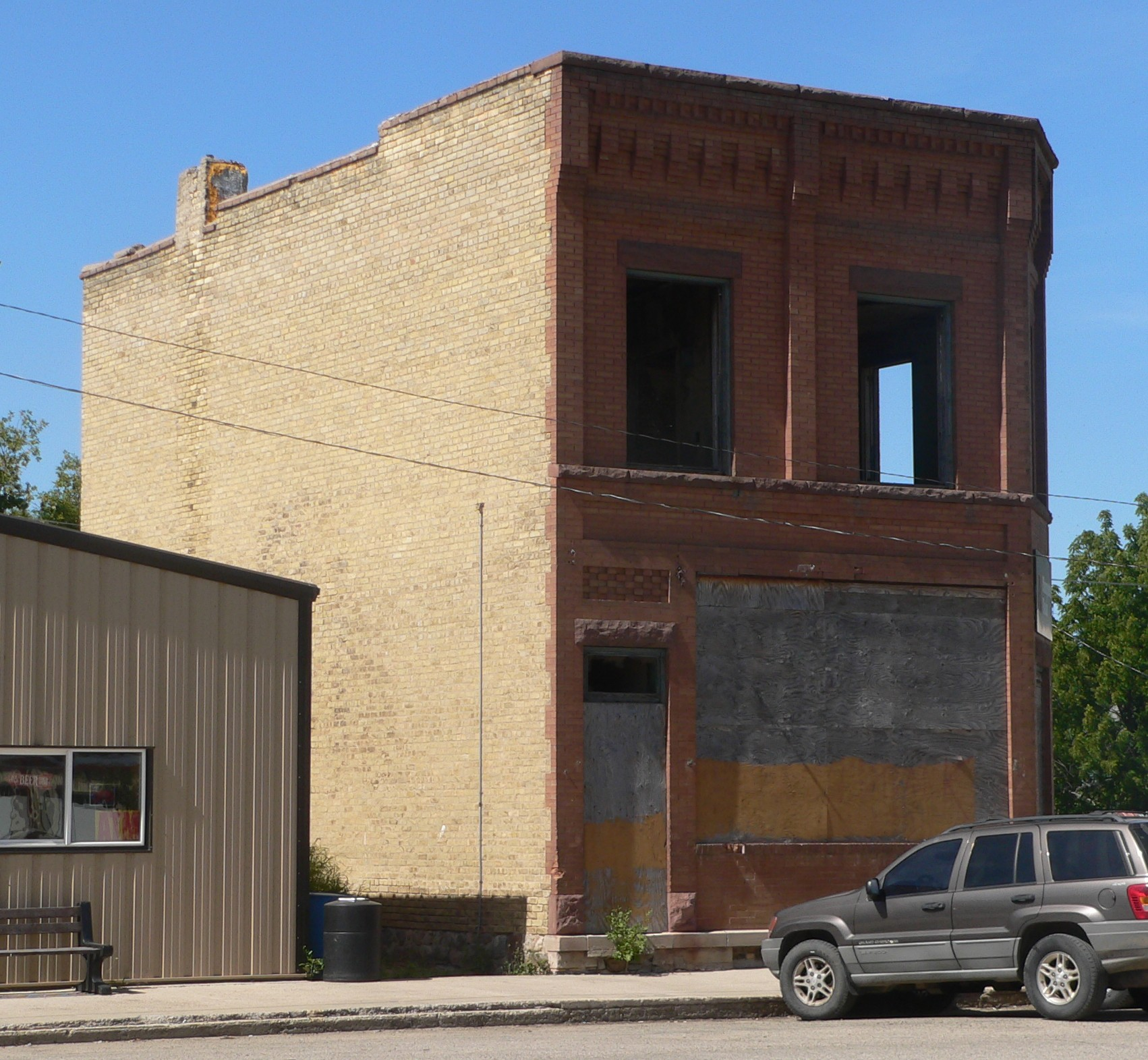
Revillo First State Bank building, September 2017

Revillo is a town in southeastern Grant County, South Dakota, United States. The population was 99 at the 2020 census.

The name of the town most likely was derived from a backwards spelling of the proper name "Olliver".

== Geography ==
According to the United States Census Bureau, the town has a total area of 0.17 square miles (0.44 km^{2}), all land.

== Demographics ==
Historical population
Census	Pop.	Note	%±
1900	187		—
1910	332		77.5%
1920	338		1.8%
1930	274		−18.9%
1940	325		18.6%
1950	249		−23.4%
1960	202		−18.9%
1970	142		−29.7%
1980	158		11.3%
1990	152		−3.8%
2000	147		−3.3%
2010	119		−19.0%
2020	99		−16.8%
U.S. Decennial Census

=== 2010 census ===
As of the census of 2010, there were 119 people, 53 households, and 32 families residing in the town. The population density was 700.0 inhabitants per square mile (270.3/km^{2}). There were 67 housing units at an average density of 394.1 per square mile (152.2/km^{2}). The racial makeup of the town was 98.3% White and 1.7% from two or more races.

There were 53 households, of which 32.1% had children under the age of 18 living with them, 41.5% were married couples living together, 13.2% had a female householder with no husband present, 5.7% had a male householder with no wife present, and 39.6% were non-families. 39.6% of all households were made up of individuals, and 28.3% had someone living alone who was 65 years of age or older. The average household size was 2.25 and the average family size was 3.00.

The median age in the town was 41.8 years. 29.4% of residents were under the age of 18; 5% were between the ages of 18 and 24; 20.2% were from 25 to 44; 29.4% were from 45 to 64; and 16% were 65 years of age or older. The gender makeup of the town was 52.1% male and 47.9% female.

=== 2000 census ===
As of the census of 2000, there were 147 people, 70 households, and 37 families residing in the town. The population density was 880.6 inhabitants per square mile (340.0/km^{2}). There were 79 housing units at an average density of 473.2 per square mile (182.7/km^{2}). The racial makeup of the town was 100.00% White.

There were 70 households, out of which 28.6% had children under the age of 18 living with them, 48.6% were married couples living together, 1.4% had a female householder with no husband present, and 47.1% were non-families. 45.7% of all households were made up of individuals, and 20.0% had someone living alone who was 65 years of age or older. The average household size was 2.10 and the average family size was 3.03.

In the town, the population was spread out, with 23.1% under the age of 18, 4.8% from 18 to 24, 33.3% from 25 to 44, 20.4% from 45 to 64, and 18.4% who were 65 years of age or older. The median age was 41 years. For every 100 females, there were 104.2 males. For every 100 females age 18 and over, there were 94.8 males.

The median income for a household in the town was $30,313, and the median income for a family was $49,375. Males had a median income of $25,313 versus $20,625 for females. The per capita income for the town was $17,462. There were none of the families and 8.3% of the population living below the poverty line, including no under eighteens and 27.3% of those over 64.

== See also ==
- List of towns in South Dakota
- List of geographic names derived from anagrams and ananyms
