= Carnegie Library (Lexington, Kentucky) =

- Carnegie Library (or Lexington Carnegie Library?)
- U.S. Historic district – Contributing property
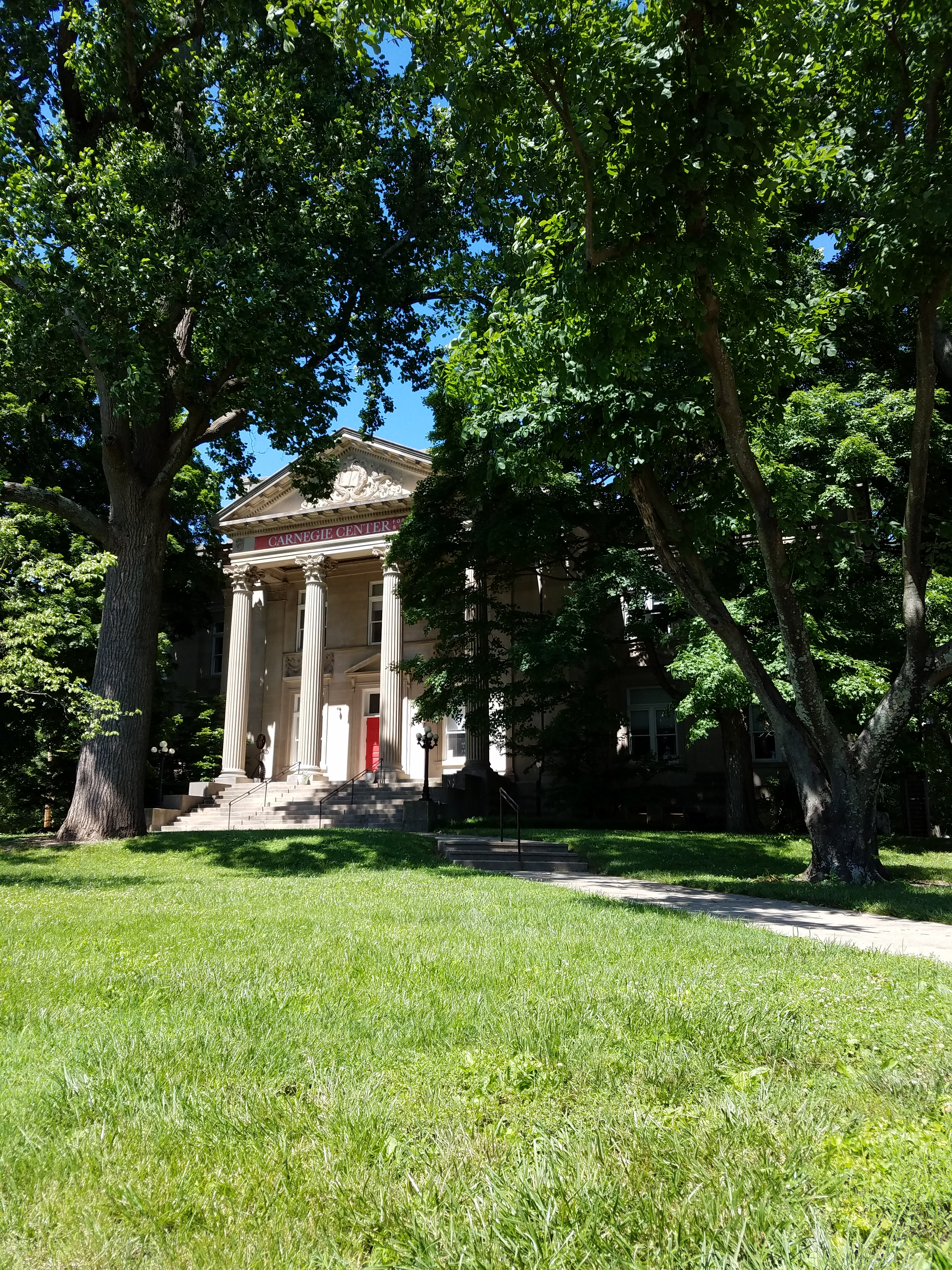
- Main facade in 2018

- Location within Kentucky Location within the United States
- Location: 251 West Second St., Lexington, Kentucky
- Coordinates: 38.0502°N 84.4956°W
- Part of: Gratz Park Historic District (ID73000796)
- Designated CP: March 14, 1973

The Carnegie Library in Lexington, Kentucky was built in 1905 and served as Lexington's main library until 1989. It is now home of the Carnegie Center for Literacy and Learning. It is one of 29 sites on a National Park Service-recommended list of places to visit in Lexington, "Lexington, Kentucky: Athens of the West, a National Register of Historic Places Travel Itinerary.

The building is a 1906-built Classical Revival-style Carnegie library, at the south end of Gratz Park, designed by architect Herman L. Rowe. It has a tetrastyle portico (observed in photo). It was built in 1906 of Bedford limestone at cost of $75,000, of which $60,000 was funded by the Carnegie Foundation. It was eventually replaced as the Lexington Public Library by a new, large central library on East Main Street.

The library is listed on the National Register of Historic Places as a contributing building in the Gratz Park Historic District, listed in 1973. It is one of 18 buildings in the district.

It was one of 2,500 public libraries built by Andrew Carnegie's funding between 1883 and 1929. The building reopened as the Carnegie Center in 1992.

== Carnegie Center for Literacy and Learning ==
The Carnegie Center for Literacy and Learning is a 501(c)(3) educational nonprofit in Lexington, Kentucky dedicated to literacy and the literary arts, hosted within the library. It provides tutoring and classes, sponsors writers' meetups and conferences, and runs the Kentucky Writers Hall of Fame program.

Its stated mission is "to empower people to explore and express their voices through imaginative learning and the literary arts."

In 1993, the Carnegie Center's tutoring program was started by Phyllis MacAdam.

In 2013, the Carnegie Center for Literacy and Learning initiated the Kentucky Writers Hall of Fame, and inducted their inaugural class.

In 2014, the Carnegie Center won the Kentucky Foundation for Women's award in education for "two decades of activities focused on promoting literacy and literary arts in Kentucky".

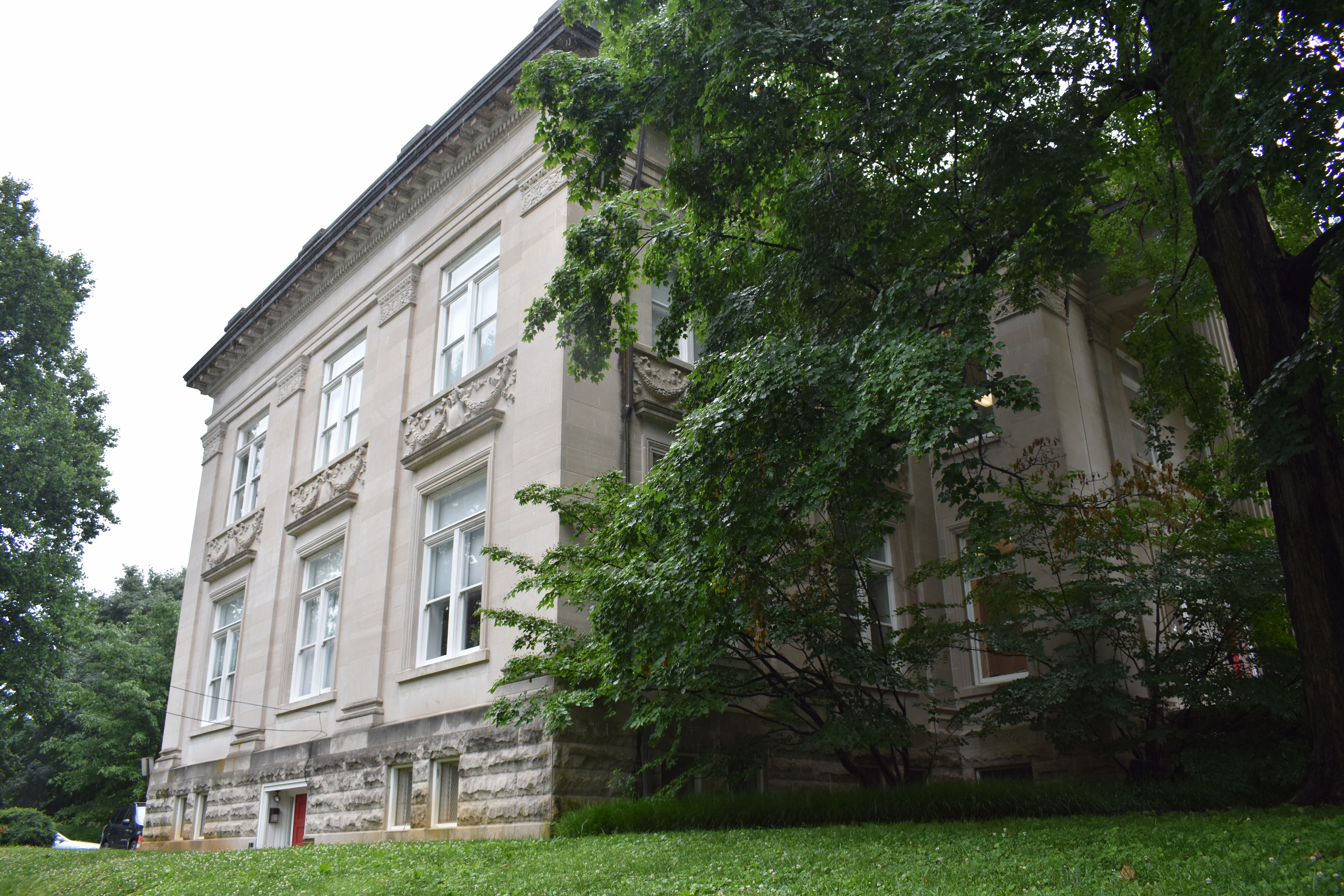
Side view of building.

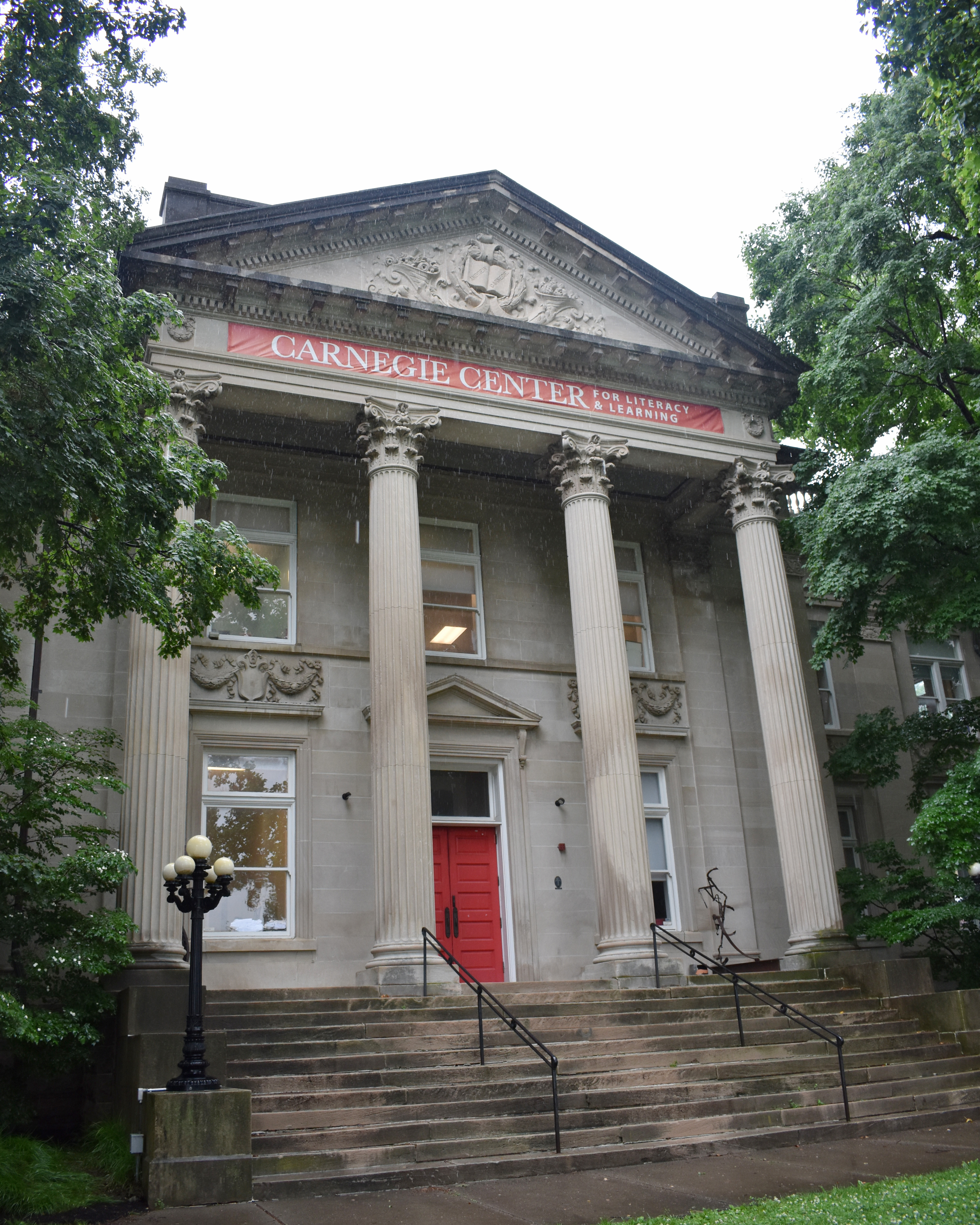
Tetrastyle columns with Corinthian capitals.

== See also ==
- List of Carnegie libraries in Kentucky
- National Register of Historic Places listings in Fayette County, Kentucky
