= First State Bank Building (Revillo, South Dakota) =

- U.S. National Register of Historic Places
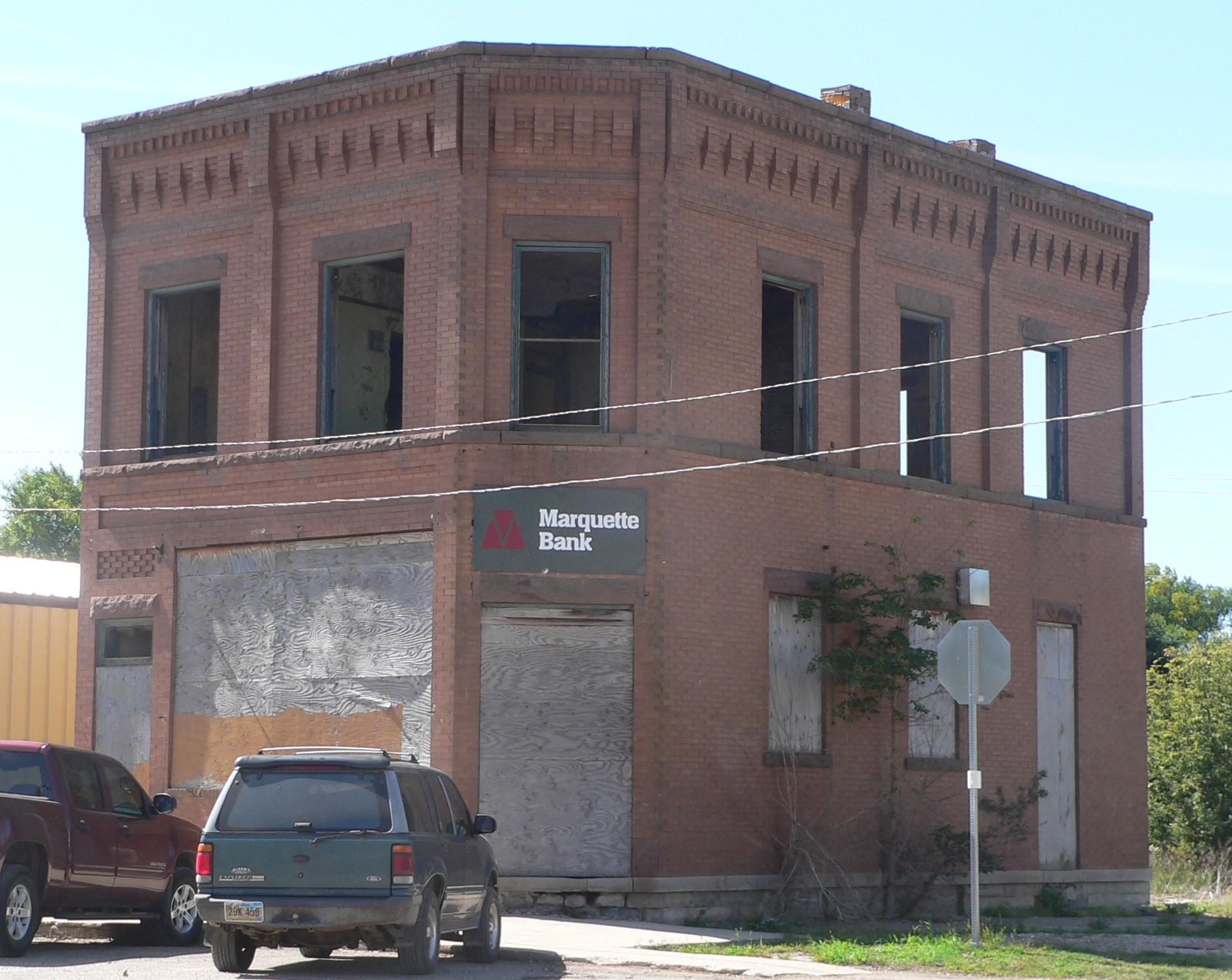

- Location within South Dakota Location within the United States
- Location: 4th St and 2nd Ave, Revillo, South Dakota
- Coordinates: 45.016438°N 96.571482°W
- Built: 1905
- Built by: Lippert, Fred
- Architect: Bogardus, E.R.
- Architectural style: Romanesque
- NRHP reference No.: 87000221
- Added to NRHP: February 26, 1987

The First State Bank Building in Revillo, South Dakota was built in 1905. It was listed on the National Register of Historic Places in 1987.

It was designed in commercial Romanesque Revival style by architect E.R. Bogardus, with brick corbelling, a corner front entrance, and long rectangular windows, and it cost $3,843.00 to build.
