= Carnegie Library (Danville, Kentucky) =

- U.S. National Register of Historic Places
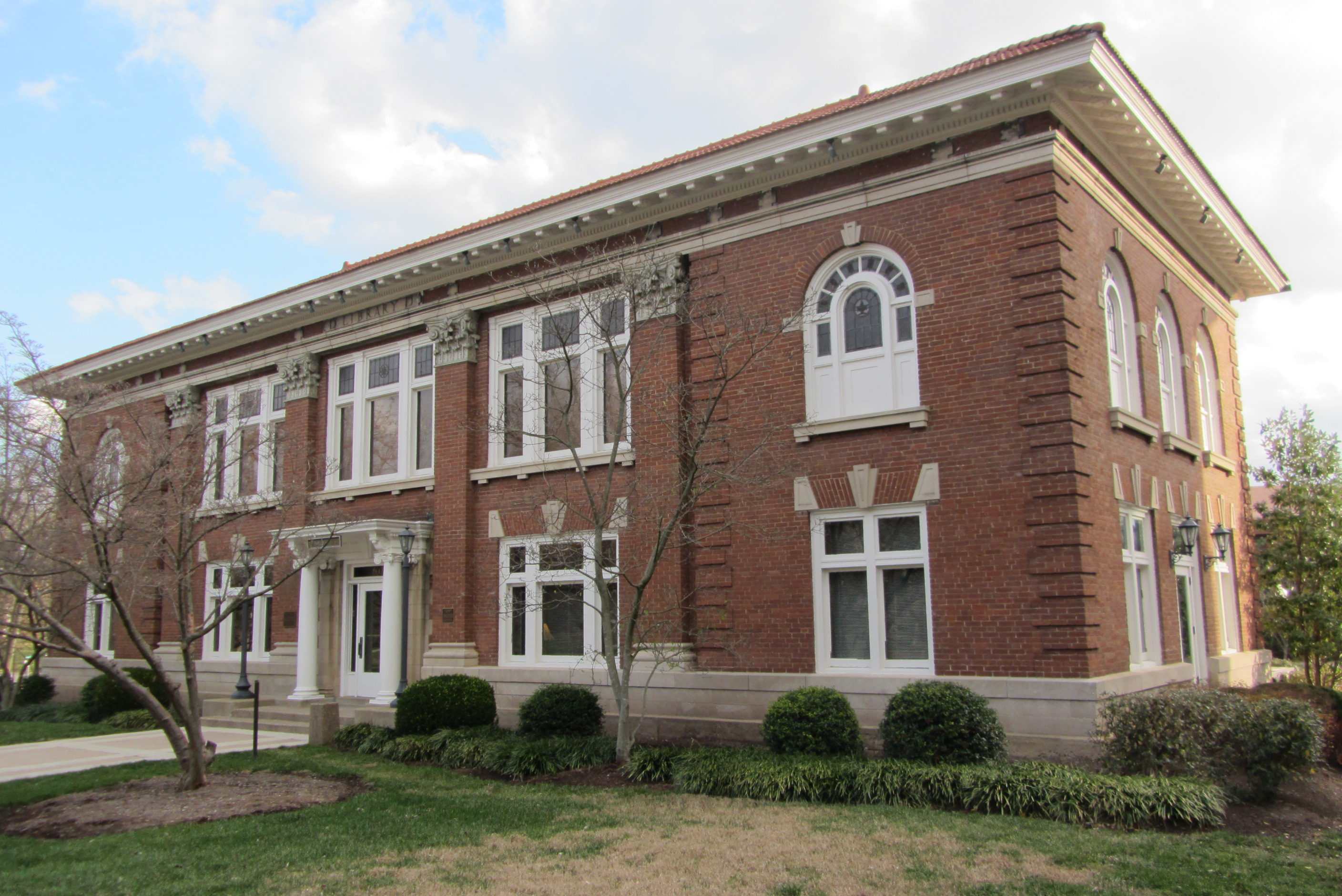

- Location within Kentucky Location within the United States
- Location: Centre College campus, Danville, Kentucky
- Coordinates: 37°38′40″N 84°46′45″W
- Area: 1 acre (0.40 ha)
- Built: 1913
- Architect: Grant C. Miller
- Architectural style: Classical Revival
- MPS: Danville MRA
- NRHP reference No.: 86000645
- Added to NRHP: March 28, 1986

The former Carnegie Library in Danville, Kentucky, is a building on the Centre College campus. Built in 1913 as a Carnegie library, with designs by Grant C Miller of Chicago. The building had offices and library stacks on the lower floor and a reading room on the upper floor. It served as the college library until 1967. In 1993, the building was renovated for use as the College Careers Service.

The building was listed on the National Register of Historic Places in 1986.
