= Carnegie Public Library (Havre, Montana) =

- Carnegie Public Library, Havre, Montana
- U.S. National Register of Historic Places
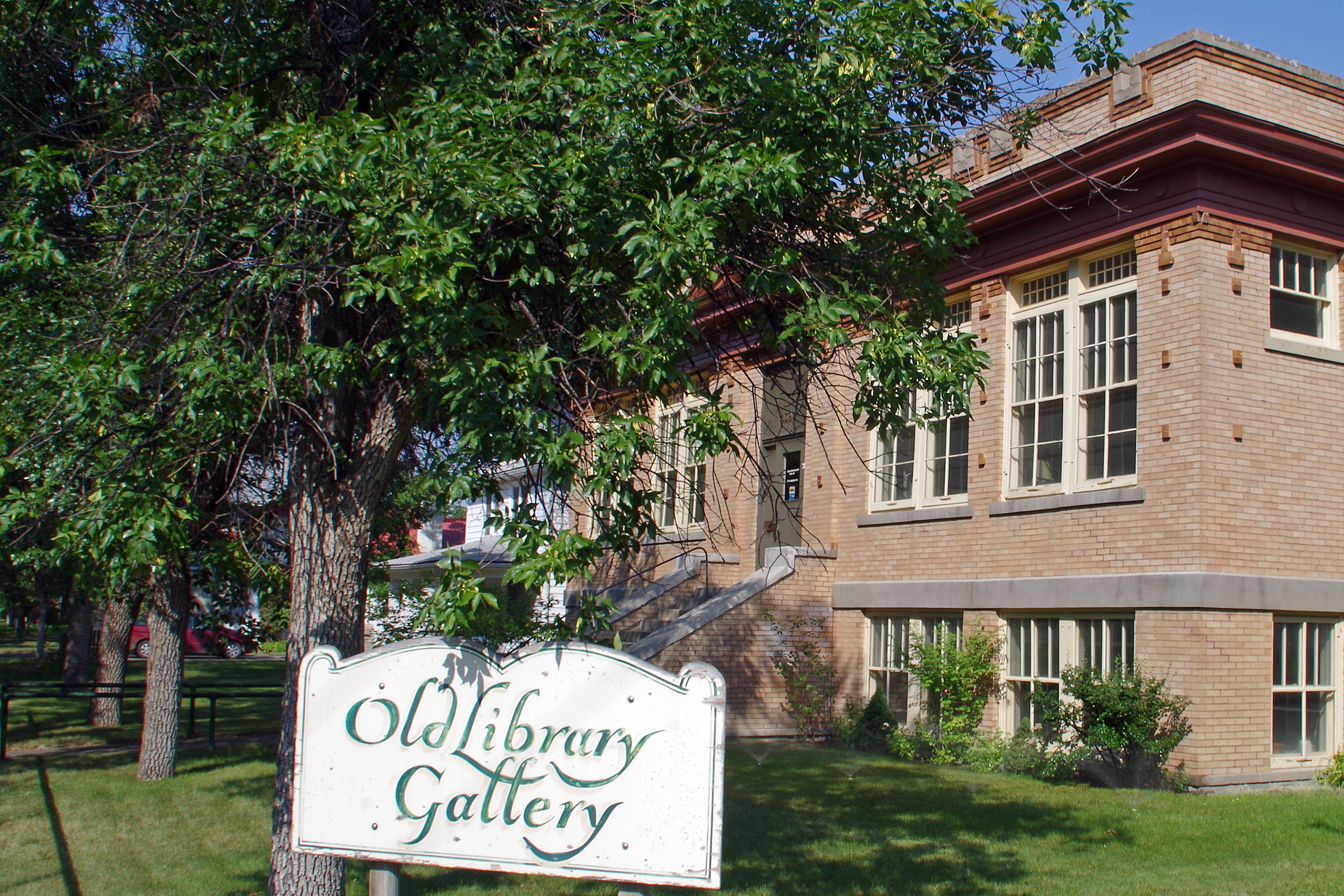

- Location within Montana Location within the United States
- Location: 447 Fourth Ave., Havre, Montana
- Coordinates: 48°32′57″N 109°40′35″W
- Area: less than one acre
- Built: 1914
- Built by: E. C. Richmond
- Architect: Marion B. Riffo
- Architectural style: Classical Revival
- NRHP reference No.: 86001934
- Added to NRHP: July 24, 1986

The Carnegie Public Library in Havre, Montana is a historic Carnegie library built in 1914 which was listed on the National Register of Historic Places in 1986. It is in the Classical revival style. It was also known as the Havre Public Library and later as the Old Carnegie Library. In 2017 it is a former library building and is occupied by the Old Library Gallery.

Hopes for obtaining Carnegie funds for a library were expressed in the Milk River Eagle newspaper by 1901. A first library in Havre was started by 50 women who formed a Women's Club and subscribed for twenty-five cents per month. A room in the Havre Security State Bank was used to lend out its initial 200 donated books. The library moved to the Havre City Hall by 1906. The Havre Plaindealer newspaper noted that Glasgow, Montana, fifty miles away, successfully built a Carnegie library in 1908. By 1911 the women's club and others had lobbied for local tax funding to support a librarian, and the Havre Library Board lobbied the City Council to purchase land at 4th Avenue and 5th Street to build a library. (Having land and demonstrating community support/ability to maintain a library were requirement for Carnegie funding.) In 1913, $12,000 funding for construction was approved by Carnegie, and the building was built within a year.

In 2017, the current public library in Havre is the Havre-Hill County Library, located at 402 Third Avenue, about a block away.

== See also ==
- Carnegie Public Library, located in Huntington, West Virginia
