= List of Carnegie libraries in the United States =

The following list of Carnegie libraries in the United States provides detailed information on public Carnegie libraries in each state or other territory in the United States, including the number of Carnegie libraries in that state, and the earliest and latest dates of grant award. Click on the state name to go to a detailed listing of the individual Carnegie libraries in that state (divided into public and academic sections). Note that Alaska and Delaware have no Carnegie libraries, and are thus not included in the table.

== Detail table ==
State	Number of public grants	Number of public libraries	Number of academic libraries	Earliest grant	Latest grant	Total amount (US$)
Alabama	14	14	5	Feb 13, 1901	May 15, 1916	$289,840.00
Arizona	4	4	—	Jul 4, 1899	Sep 14, 1917	$64,000.00
Arkansas	4	4	—	Mar 24, 1906	Sep 20, 1915	$138,600.00
California	121	142	2	Jul 7, 1899	Sep 14, 1917	$2,836,987.00
Colorado	27	35^{[A]}	1	Dec 21, 1899	Feb 3, 1917	$779,943.00
Connecticut	8	11	—	Aug 16, 1901	Sep 25, 1914	$191,900.00
District of Columbia	1	4	1	Mar 16, 1899	Mar 16, 1899	$732,000.00
Florida	10	10	4	Dec 30, 1901	Feb 3, 1917	$254,500.00
Georgia	20	24	5	Oct 3, 1898	Jun 11, 1914	$613,756.00
Idaho	10	10	—	Feb 12, 1903	Mar 11, 1914	$137,500.00
Illinois	105	106	5	Aug 8, 1900	Sep 29, 1915	$1,751,200.00
Indiana	156	165	2	Jan 15, 1901	Mar 11, 1918	$2,588,664.38
Iowa	99	101	7	Jan 15, 1892	Nov 7, 1917	$1,705,706.00
Kansas	58	59	7	Jan 3, 1900	Nov 9, 1916	$1,070,496.00
Kentucky	15	23	4	Oct 30, 1899	Apr 13, 1914	$896,800.00
Louisiana	4	9	—	Oct 17, 1901	Apr 8, 1907	$380,000.00
Maine	18^{[B]}	18	2	Jan 15, 1901	Feb 15, 1912	$311,450.00
Maryland	1	14	—	Nov 10, 1906	Nov 10, 1906	$500,000.00
Massachusetts	35	43	5	Mar 8, 1901	Feb 3, 1917	$1,651,346.00
Michigan	53	61	—	Feb 6, 1901	Apr 16, 1918	$1,655,950.00
Minnesota	57	65^{[C]}	1	Oct 7, 1899	Nov 7, 1917	$998,975.00^{[D]}
Mississippi	10	11	2	Dec 2, 1904	Nov 22, 1923	$235,000.00
Missouri	26	33	2	Oct 28, 1899	May 2, 1921	$1,555,143.84
Montana	17	17	—	Jun 21, 1901	Oct 29, 1918	$226,700.00
Nebraska	68	69	—	Dec 20, 1899	Sep 14, 1917	$706,288.00
Nevada	1	1	—	Mar 14, 1902	Mar 14, 1902	$15,000.00
New Hampshire	9	9	1	Mar 14, 1902	Dec 13, 1907	$154,000.00
New Jersey	30^{[E]}	36^{[E]}	—	Jan 18, 1900	Apr 3, 1917	$1,066,935.03
New Mexico	3	3	—	Mar 14, 1902	Jan 23, 1911	$32,000.00
New York (New York City alone)	41 (1)	106 (66)	3 (—)	Dec 8, 1899	Dec 22, 1922	$6,697,149.00
North Carolina	9	10	6	Mar 12, 1901	Sep 14, 1917	$294,313.71
North Dakota	8	8	3	Mar 6, 1901	Jan 28, 1916	$201,100.00
Ohio	79^{[F]}	106^{[F]}	7	Jun 30, 1899	May 2, 1921	$3,239,928.64
Oklahoma	24	24	1	Oct 27, 1899	Mar 31, 1916	$494,500.00
Oregon	25	31	1	Feb 21, 1901	Jan 6, 1915	$498,000.00
Pennsylvania (Allegheny County) (Philadelphia alone)	27 (12) (1)	59 (19) (25)	9 (2) (1)	1886	May 3, 1917	$5,610,587.00^{[G]}
Rhode Island	—	—	1	Mar 30, 1905	Mar 30, 1905	$150,000.00
South Carolina	14	14	4	Jan 13, 1903	May 15, 1916	$189,700.00
South Dakota	25	25	2	Jan 24, 1901	May 3, 1917	$311,000.00
Tennessee	10	13	7	Dec 27, 1900	Jan 11, 1917	$605,500.00
Texas	30	32	1	Apr 30, 1898	Apr 19, 1915	$664,500.00
Utah	23	23	—	Mar 9, 1901	Sep 26, 1919	$255,470.00
Vermont	4	4	1	Jul 25, 1901	Mar 18, 1911	$105,000.00
Virginia	2	3	4	Mar 8, 1901	Dec 14, 1921	$253,000.00
Washington	33	44^{[H]}	—	Jan 6, 1901	Nov 9, 1916	$1,046,000.00
West Virginia	3	3	1	Dec 30, 1901	Apr 8, 1907	$101,500.00
Wisconsin	60	63	2	Feb 13, 1901	Sep 29, 1915	$1,149,511.50
Wyoming	16	16	—	Dec 27, 1899	Apr 3, 1917	$257,500.00
Hawaii	1	1	—	Nov 29, 1909	Nov 29, 1909	$100,000.00
Puerto Rico	1	1	—	October 4, 1901	October 4, 1901	$100,000.00
Totals	1,419	1,687	109	1886	Nov 22, 1923	$45,865,440.10

- A: Owing to confusion from Old Colorado City's incorporation into Colorado Springs, Jones counts a library twice and reports this figure as 36.
- B: Bobinski and Miller do not list Gardiner as having received a full grant because its grant was to complete an unfinished building (noted in Anderson and Miller); Anderson and Jones include it.
- C: Jones erroneously reports this number as 64, while Bobinski reports the number of grants at 58. However, all four references list 65 libraries in their gazetteers; Anderson, Jones, and Miller list 57 grants.
- D: No reference tallies this number correctly for the public libraries. The amount is reported as $962,475 by Anderson, who for unknown reasons omits Walker from his list. Bobinski and Miller list Walker, but sum to $969,375. However, their gazetteers sum to $968,975 which, when added to $30,000 grant for the academic library in Saint Paul, confirms the above figure.
- E: Bobinski and Miller do not list Orange's library in summary tables, but note in their full listings that the community received a small grant toward the purchase of a branch library.
- F: Bobinski and Miller summarize 105 Ohio libraries, though Miller's summary details 107. Jones, who investigated the branch libraries of Cleveland and Cincinnati, arrives at 106, the most authoritative number.
- G: This figure includes the cost of the central library in Pittsburgh, which Miller does not include.
- H: Bobinski and Miller claim there are just 43 libraries in Washington but detail 44 in their summary tables, which matches the other references.

== Map ==
Alternately, click on the state in the map below to go to the list of Carnegie libraries in that state.

== See also ==
- List of libraries in the United States
