= List of Carnegie libraries in Michigan =

The following list of Carnegie libraries in Michigan provides detailed information on United States Carnegie libraries in Michigan, where 61 libraries were built from 53 grants (totaling $1,655,950) awarded by the Carnegie Corporation of New York from 1901 to 1918.

== Key ==
Building still operating as a library
Building standing, but now serving another purpose
Building no longer standing
Building listed on the National Register of Historic Places
Building contributes to a historic district on the National Register of Historic Places

== Carnegie libraries ==
	Library	City or town	Image	Date granted	Grant amount	Location	Notes
1	Adrian	Adrian		Dec 20, 1904	$27,500	110 E. Church St. 41°53′50″N 84°02′13″W	Now a museum
2	Albion	Albion		Jan 2, 1903	$17,500	501 S. Superior St. 42°14′31″N 84°45′10″W	
3	Allegan	Allegan		Feb 13, 1913	$10,000	331 Hubbard St. 42°31′40″N 85°51′08″W	
4	Ann Arbor	Ann Arbor		Jan 13, 1903	$30,000	Facade at 42°16′52″N 83°44′24″W	Attached to the old Ann Arbor High School building. Closed in 1957, made part of the Henry Simmons Frieze Building at the University of Michigan. Demolished in 2007, leaving only the front columns
5	Armada	Armada		Dec 8, 1913	$8,000	73930 Church St. 42°50′31″N 82°52′59″W	
6	Bay City	Bay City		May 15, 1916	$35,000	708 Center Ave. 43°35′50″N 83°52′58″W	In service as library until December 2005. Now bank branch and offices for Thumb National Bank.
7	Benton Harbor	Benton Harbor		Mar 14, 1902	$20,000	E Wall St. and 6th St. 42°06′56″N 86°27′13″W	Now a parking lot for newer library.
8	Boyne City	Boyne City		Mar 31, 1916	$15,000	201 E. Main St. 45°12′44″N 85°00′47″W	
9	Bronson	Bronson		Jul 15, 1910	$8,500	207 N. Matteson St. 41°52′25″N 85°11′42″W	
10	Cadillac	Cadillac		Mar 20, 1903	$15,000	127 Beech St. 44°15′06″N 85°23′56″W	Now the Wexford County Historical Society Museum
11	Cassopolis	Cassopolis		Apr 23, 1908	$10,000	145 N. Broadway St. 41°54′47″N 86°00′46″W	
12	Charlevoix	Charlevoix		Feb 21, 1907	$10,000		Closed in 1967
13	Charlotte	Charlotte		Mar 14, 1902	$12,000	200 N. Cochran Ave. 42°33′55″N 84°50′08″W	Now small businesses
14	Cheboygan	Cheboygan		Feb 10, 1908	$15,000	400 W. Elm St. 45°38′41″N 84°28′42″W	Closed in 1966
15	Detroit Main	Detroit		Jun 23, 1901	$750,000	5201 Woodward Ave. 42°21′31″N 83°03′59″W	Opened in 1921
16	Detroit Herbert Bowen	Detroit		Jun 23, 1901	—	3648 W. Vernor Hwy. 42°19′23″N 83°05′20″W	
17	Detroit Magnus Butzel	Detroit		Jun 23, 1901	—	2025 E. Grand Blvd. 42°22′31″N 83°02′29″W	Demolished in 1998
18	Detroit Edwin F. Conely	Detroit		Jun 23, 1901	—	4600 Martin Rd. 42°19′55″N 83°07′39″W	
19	Detroit Divie B. Duffield	Detroit		Jun 23, 1901	—	2507 W. Grand Blvd. 42°21′47″N 83°05′36″W	
20	Detroit Bernard Ginsburg	Detroit		Jun 23, 1901	—	91 Brewster St. 42°20′48″N 83°02′50″W	Closed in 1927 and turned over to Recreation Department. Part of the Brewster-Wheeler Recreation Center, now vacant
21	Detroit George V. N. Lothrop	Detroit		Jun 23, 1901	—	W. Grand Blvd. and Warren Ave W. 42°20′41″N 83°06′29″W	A Georgian structure designed by B.C. Wetzel. Building demolished in October 2009 after purchasing church didn't keep up the property & the City of Detroit stepped in quickly.
22	Detroit George Osius	Detroit		Jun 23, 1901	—	Gratiot Ave. between Newland Ave. and Seneca St. 42°23′01″N 83°00′41″W	Torn down in 1939 when Gratiot was widened. Replaced by Mark Twain Branch (demolished in 2011). Site vacant.
23	Detroit Henry M. Utley	Detroit		Jun 23, 1901	—	8726 Woodward Ave. 42°22′48″N 83°04′46″W	Now Family Place, a child care center.
24	Dowagiac	Dowagiac		Jan 13, 1903	$12,500	211 Commercial St. 41°58′59″N 86°06′38″W	
25	East Jordan	East Jordan		Feb 6, 1915	$10,000	301 Main St. 45°09′24″N 85°07′40″W	Now the East Jordan Arts Center Gallery
26	Escanaba	Escanaba		Apr 11, 1902	$21,200	251 S. 7th St. 45°44′39″N 87°03′22″W	Building is now privately owned.
27	Flint	Flint		Dec 27, 1902	$25,000	Clifford St. and East Kearsley St. 43°01′09″N 83°41′10″W	Demolished c.1960
28	Grand Haven	Grand Haven		Feb 12, 1903	$12,500	15 N. 3rd St.	Demolished c.1967
29	Houghton	Houghton		Apr 23, 1908	$15,000	105 Huron St. 47°07′17″N 88°34′05″W	Closed in 2006, now a museum
30	Howell	Howell		Jan 9, 1902	$15,000	314 W. Grand River Ave. 42°36′30″N 83°55′56″W	
31	Hudson	Hudson		Mar 27, 1903	$10,000	205 S. Market St. 41°51′14″N 84°21′13″W	
32	Iron Mountain	Iron Mountain		Mar 12, 1901	$17,500	300 Ludington St.	
33	Ironwood	Ironwood		Apr 21, 1900	$17,000	235 E. Aurora St. 46°27′08″N 90°10′20″W	
34	Ishpeming	Ishpeming		Mar 12, 1901	$25,000	317 Main St. 46°29′29″N 87°40′10″W	
35	Jackson	Jackson		Mar 14, 1901	$70,000	244 W. Michigan Ave. 42°14′53″N 84°24′40″W	
36	Lansing	Lansing		Jan 9, 1902	$35,000	210 W. Shiawassee St.	Now part of Lansing Community College. Original pediment removed and upper part of building modified.
37	Lapeer	Lapeer		Apr 3, 1917	$13,750	921 W. Nepessing St.	
38	Ludington	Ludington		Jun 5, 1903	$15,000	217 E. Ludington Ave.	
39	Mancelona	Mancelona		Jan 5, 1916	$10,000	202 W. State St.	
40	Manistee	Manistee		Apr 26, 1902	$35,000	95 Maple St.	
41	Marlette	Marlette		Apr 16, 1918	$7,500	3116 Main St.	
42	Mendon	Mendon		Apr 11, 1905	$10,000	314 W. Main St.	
43	Midland	Midland		Feb 3, 1917	$12,500	Townsend St.	Closed in 1955
44	Mount Clemens	Mount Clemens		Mar 14, 1902	$17,000	125 Macomb St. 42°35′59″N 82°52′49″W	
45	Newaygo	Newaygo		Dec 8, 1913	$5,000	45 State Rd.	
46	Niles	Niles		Jan 22, 1903	$15,000	321 E. Main St.	Now houses The Study and The Underground Laugh Lounge
47	Owosso	Owosso		Apr 2, 1913	$20,000	502 W. Main St.	
48	Paw Paw	Paw Paw		Apr 3, 1917	$10,000	129 S. Kalamazoo St.	Closed in 1991
49	Petoskey	Petoskey		Apr 8, 1907	$12,500	451 E. Mitchell St.	
50	Port Huron	Port Huron		Feb 4, 1902	$45,000	1115 6th St.	Currently houses the Port Huron Museum
51	Portland	Portland		Mar 25, 1905	$10,000	334 Kent St.	
52	Sault Ste. Marie	Sault Ste. Marie		Feb 6, 1901	$30,000	315 Armory Pl.	Now school district offices
53	South Haven	South Haven		Dec 20, 1904	$12,500	600 Phoenix St.	Now an arts center
54	Sparta	Sparta		Mar 31, 1916	$10,000	80 N. Union St.	
55	St. Joseph	St. Joseph		Dec 27, 1902	$13,500	500 Main St.	Now houses an architectural firm
56	Stambaugh	Stambaugh		Apr 13, 1914	$12,500	601 Garfield Ave.	Now school district offices
57	Sturgis	Sturgis		Dec 13, 1907	$10,000		Demolished, Ca. 1967
58	Tecumseh	Tecumseh		Feb 2, 1903	$10,000	304 W. Chicago Blvd.	Closed c.1962, now artist studios
59	Three Rivers	Three Rivers		Sep 5, 1902	$12,500	107 N. Main St.	Now an arts center
60	Traverse City	Traverse City		Apr 11, 1902	$20,000	322 6th St.	Now an arts center
61	Wyandotte	Wyandotte		Jan 23, 1911	$17,500	3139 Biddle Ave.	Closed 1940, demolished 1967

== See also ==
- List of libraries in the United States
