= Old Hamilton Library =

Historic library in Maryland, US

- U.S. National Register of Historic Places
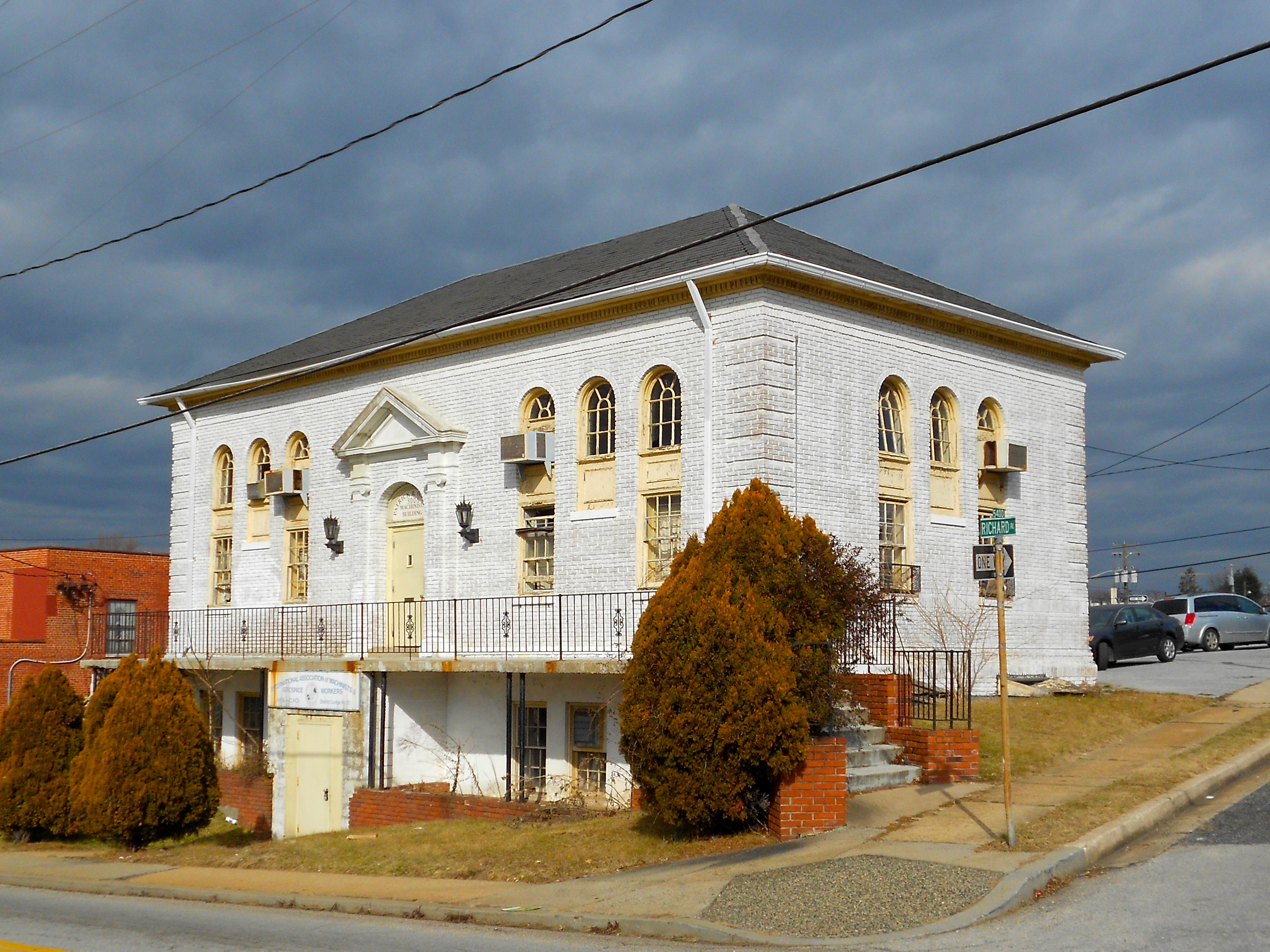

- Location within Baltimore Location within Maryland Location within the United States
- Location: 3006 Hamilton Ave., Baltimore, Maryland
- Coordinates: 39°21′6″N 76°33′39″W
- Area: 0.229 acres (0.093 ha)
- Built: 1920
- Architect: Theodore Wells Pietsch I
- Architectural style: Beaux Arts
- NRHP reference No.: 12000817
- Added to NRHP: September 25, 2012

The Old Hamilton Library is a historic library building at 3006 Hamilton Avenue in Baltimore, Maryland. The three-story masonry Beaux Arts building was constructed in 1920 in the Hamilton neighborhood of the city as a branch of the Enoch Pratt Free Library. The building was designed by architect Theodore Wells Pietsch I, who designed a number of other Baltimore landmarks, and funded in part by a grant from steel baron and philanthropist Andrew Carnegie. The building served as a library until 1959, after which it was converted to commercial office use.

The building was listed on the National Register of Historic Places in 2012.

== See also ==
- National Register of Historic Places listings in East and Northeast Baltimore
- List of Carnegie libraries in Maryland
