= List of Carnegie libraries in Arizona =

Arizona Carnegie libraries

The following list of Carnegie libraries in Arizona provides detailed information on United States Carnegie libraries in Arizona, where 4 libraries were built from 4 grants (totaling $64,000) awarded by the Carnegie Corporation of New York from 1899 to 1917.

== Key ==
Building still operating as a library
Building standing, but now serving another purpose
Building listed on the National Register of Historic Places

== Carnegie libraries ==
	Library	City or town	Image	Date granted	Grant amount	Location	Notes
1	Phoenix	Phoenix		Apr 26, 1902	$25,000	1101 W Washington St. 33°26′51.62″N 112°5′13.19″W	Closed after serving as the Phoenix Public Library from 1908 to 1953. Now the Carnegie Center, a multi-service center which includes the Arizona State Library.
2	Prescott	Prescott		Jul 4, 1899	$4,000	125 E Gurley St. 34°32′30.02″N 112°28′3.32″W	Open from November 24, 1903, until 1975. The building is now home to several private businesses.
3	Tucson	Tucson		Oct 27, 1899	$25,000	200 S 6th Ave. 32°13′9.09″N 110°58′8.96″W	Served as the Tucson Public Library from 1901 to 1991. In 1991, it became the Tucson Children's Museum.
4	Yuma	Yuma		Sep 14, 1917	$10,000	350 S 3rd Ave. 32°43′14.21″N 114°37′26.63″W	Opened February 24, 1921. Although heavily renovated in the 1950s and again in 2008, the original Carnegie library still stands as a branch library for the Yuma County Library District.

== See also ==
- List of libraries in the United States
