= List of libraries in the United States =

This is a list of libraries in the United States of America.

== Libraries by region/territory ==
=== Midwest ===
Illinois

- Libraries in Illinois
- List of Carnegie libraries in Illinois

Indiana

- Libraries in Indiana
- List of Carnegie libraries in Indiana

Iowa

- Libraries in Iowa
- List of Carnegie libraries in Iowa

Kansas

- Libraries in Kansas
- List of Carnegie libraries in Kansas

Michigan

- Libraries in Michigan
- List of Carnegie libraries in Michigan

Minnesota

- Libraries in Minnesota
- List of Carnegie libraries in Minnesota
- List of Hennepin County Library branches

Missouri

- Libraries in Missouri
- List of Carnegie libraries in Missouri

Nebraska

- Libraries in Nebraska
- List of Carnegie libraries in Nebraska
- Omaha Public Library branches

North Dakota

- Libraries in North Dakota
- List of Carnegie libraries in North Dakota

Ohio

- Libraries in Ohio
- List of Carnegie libraries in Ohio

South Dakota

- Libraries in South Dakota
- List of Carnegie libraries in South Dakota

Wisconsin

- Libraries in Wisconsin
- List of Carnegie libraries in Wisconsin

=== Northeast ===
Connecticut

- Libraries in Connecticut
- List of Carnegie libraries in Connecticut
- List of libraries in Connecticut in the 18th century

Maine

- Libraries in Maine
- List of Carnegie libraries in Maine

Massachusetts

- Libraries in Massachusetts
- List of Carnegie libraries in Massachusetts
- List of libraries in 18th-century Massachusetts
- List of libraries in 19th-century Boston
- List of public libraries in Massachusetts

New Hampshire

- Libraries in New Hampshire
- List of Carnegie libraries in New Hampshire

New Jersey

- Libraries in New Jersey
- List of Carnegie libraries in New Jersey

New York

- Libraries in New York
- List of Brooklyn Public Library branches
- List of Carnegie libraries in New York
- List of Carnegie libraries in New York City
- List of libraries in 19th-century New York City
- List of New York Public Library branches
- List of Queens Public Library branches

Pennsylvania

- Libraries in Pennsylvania
- List of Carnegie libraries in Pennsylvania
- List of Carnegie libraries in Philadelphia
- List of libraries in 19th-century Philadelphia
- List of public libraries in Delaware County, Pennsylvania

Rhode Island

Vermont

- Libraries in Vermont
- List of Carnegie libraries in Vermont

=== South ===
Alabama

- Libraries in Alabama
- List of Carnegie libraries in Alabama

Arkansas

- Libraries in Arkansas
- List of Carnegie libraries in Arkansas

District of Columbia

- Libraries in Washington, D.C.
- List of Carnegie libraries in Washington, D.C.

Florida

- Libraries in Florida
- List of Carnegie libraries in Florida

Georgia

- Libraries in Georgia (U.S. state)
- List of Carnegie libraries in Georgia
- List of public library systems in Georgia

Kentucky

- Libraries in Kentucky
- List of Carnegie libraries in Kentucky

Louisiana

- Libraries in Louisiana
- List of Carnegie libraries in Louisiana

Maryland

- Libraries in Maryland
- List of Carnegie libraries in Maryland

Mississippi

- Libraries in Mississippi
- List of Carnegie libraries in Mississippi

North Carolina

- Libraries in North Carolina
- List of Carnegie libraries in North Carolina

Oklahoma

- Libraries in Oklahoma
- List of Carnegie libraries in Oklahoma

South Carolina

- Libraries in South Carolina
- List of Carnegie libraries in South Carolina

Tennessee

- Libraries in Tennessee
- List of Carnegie libraries in Tennessee

Texas

- Libraries in Dallas
- Libraries in Texas
- List of Carnegie libraries in Texas

Virginia

- Libraries in Virginia
- List of Carnegie libraries in Virginia

West Virginia

=== Territories ===
American Samoa

- Feleti Barstow Public Library

Guam

- Libraries in Guam

Northern Mariana Islands

- State Library of the Commonwealth of the Northern Mariana Islands

Puerto Rico

- Libraries in Puerto Rico
- List of Carnegie libraries in Puerto Rico
- List of libraries in Ponce, Puerto Rico

=== West ===
Alaska

- Libraries in Alaska

Arizona

- Libraries in Arizona
- List of Carnegie libraries in Arizona

California

- Libraries in California
- List of Carnegie libraries in California
- List of public libraries in Los Angeles County, California

Colorado

- Libraries in Colorado
- List of Carnegie libraries in Colorado

Hawaii

- Libraries in Hawaii
- List of Carnegie libraries in Hawaii

Idaho

- Libraries in Idaho
- List of Carnegie libraries in Idaho

Montana

- Libraries in Montana
- List of Carnegie libraries in Montana

Nevada

- Libraries in Nevada
- List of Carnegie libraries in Nevada

New Mexico

- Libraries in New Mexico
- List of Carnegie libraries in New Mexico

Oregon

Utah

- Libraries in Utah
- List of Carnegie libraries in Utah

Washington (state)

- Libraries in Washington (state)
- List of Carnegie libraries in Washington (state)
- List of libraries in Seattle

Wyoming

- Libraries in Wyoming
- List of Carnegie libraries in Wyoming

== Libraries by type ==
- African-American libraries
- Genealogical libraries in the United States
- Government libraries:
  - Federal Depository Library Program
  - List of U.S. state libraries and archives
  - National libraries in the United States
  - United States presidential library system
- Law libraries in the United States
- Medical: List of medical libraries in the United States
- Music libraries in the United States
- Prison libraries in the United States
- Private libraries in the United States
- Public libraries in the United States
  - List of Carnegie libraries in the United States
- Rare book libraries in the United States
- Research libraries in the United States
- Subscription libraries in the United States
- University libraries in the United States

== See also ==
- American literature
- Copyright law of the United States
- History of libraries in the United States
- Library associations in the United States
- List of archives in the United States
- List of largest libraries in the United States
- Mass media in the United States
