= List of Carnegie libraries in Ohio =

The following list of Carnegie libraries in Ohio provides detailed information on United States Carnegie libraries in Ohio, where 104 public libraries were built from 79 grants (totaling $2,846,484) awarded by the Carnegie Corporation of New York from 1899 to 1915. In addition, academic libraries were built at 7 institutions (totaling $368,445).

== Key ==
Building still operating as a library
Building standing, but now serving another purpose
Building no longer standing
Building listed on the National Register of Historic Places
Building contributes to a historic district on the National Register of Historic Places

== Public libraries ==
	Library	City or town	Image	Date granted	Grant amount	Location	Notes
1	Akron	Akron		Dec 24, 1901	$82,000	69 E. Market St.	Open 1904–1942, now law offices
2	Alliance	Alliance		Jan 13, 1903	$25,000	NE corner of S. Arch Ave. & High St.	Demolished 1974
3	Amherst	Amherst		Mar 8, 1904	$10,000	221 Spring St.	
4	Ashtabula	Ashtabula		Mar 6, 1901	$15,000	335 W. 44th St.	
5	Athens	Athens		Dec 16, 1903	$30,000	32 Park Place	Designed by Columbus architect Frank L. Packard. Originally a public library on the Ohio University campus. Open 1905–1930, now Scripps Hall, used for classroom space
6	Bellefontaine	Bellefontaine		Jan 6, 1903	$14,000	140 N. Main St.	Closed 1994, Became county offices. 2020 - Purchased by Richwood Bank.
7	Bellevue	Bellevue		Jan 13, 1903	$13,600	224 E. Main St.	
8	Bristolville	Bristolville		Apr 25, 1911	$6,000	1855 Greenville Rd.	
9	Bryan	Bryan		Feb 12, 1903	$10,000	107 E. High St.	
10	Bucyrus	Bucyrus		Jun 1, 1903	$15,000	200 E. Mansfield St.	
11	Cambridge	Cambridge		Jan 22, 1902	$21,000	800 Steubenville Ave.	Designed by Columbus architect Frank L. Packard.
12	Canton	Canton		Apr 15, 1901	$60,000	236 3rd St. SW	Open 1903–1978, now law offices
13	Carey	Carey		Dec 30, 1904	$8,000	236 E. Findlay St.	
14	Celina	Celina		Dec 30, 1904	$12,000	303 N. Main St.	Building replaced by the Dwyer Mercer County District Library in 1970. After further expansion, name changed to Mercer County District Library in 1994.
15	Chillicothe	Chillicothe		Apr 13, 1903	$30,000	140 S. Paint St.	Opened 1907, now the Chillicothe & Ross County Public Library (Main library)
16	Cincinnati Avondale	Cincinnati		Apr 9, 1902	$286,000	3566 Reading Rd.	Opened 1913
17	Cincinnati Cumminsville	Cincinnati		Apr 9, 1902	—	4219 Hamilton Ave.	Opened 1908, now Northside Branch
18	Cincinnati East End	Cincinnati		Apr 9, 1902	—	3738 Eastern Ave.	Open 1907–1959. Now The Carnegie Center
19	Cincinnati Hyde Park	Cincinnati		Apr 9, 1902	—	2747 Erie Ave.	Built 1912
20	Cincinnati North Cincinnati	Cincinnati		Apr 9, 1902	—	2802 Vine St.	Opened 1907, now Corryville Branch
21	Cincinnati Norwood	Norwood		Nov 3, 1904	$23,000	4325 Montgomery Rd.	Opened 1907
22	Cincinnati Price Hill	Cincinnati		Apr 9, 1902	—	3215 Warsaw Ave.	Opened 1909
23	Cincinnati Walnut Hills	Cincinnati		Apr 9, 1902	—	2533 Kemper Ln.	Opened 1906
24	Cincinnati West End	Cincinnati		Apr 9, 1902	—	NE corner of W. 8th St. & State Ave.	Opened 1908, demolished 1947
25	Cleveland Broadway	Cleveland		Apr 4, 1903	$590,000	5437 Broadway Ave.	Open 1906–1987, later became a church, purchased in 2022 and reopened in 2023 as the Darl Center for Performing Arts
26	Cleveland Brooklyn	Cleveland		Apr 4, 1903	—	3706 Pearl Rd.	Opened 1919
27	Cleveland Carnegie West	Cleveland		Apr 4, 1903	—	1900 Fulton Rd.	Opened 1910
28	Cleveland East 79th	Cleveland		Apr 4, 1903	—	1215 E. 79th St.	Open 1916–1989, now a drug abuse treatment program
29	Cleveland Hough	Cleveland		Apr 4, 1903	—	1765 Crawford Rd.	Open 1907–1984, later African American Museum, closed since 2005. On Preservation Ohio's 2020 most endangered historic sites list.
30	Cleveland Jefferson	Cleveland		Apr 4, 1903	—	850 Jefferson Ave.	Opened 1918
31	Cleveland Lorain	Cleveland		Apr 4, 1903	—	8216 Lorain Ave.	Opened 1912
32	Cleveland Miles Park	Cleveland		Apr 4, 1903	—	9250 Miles Park Ave.	
33	Cleveland Quincy	Cleveland		Apr 4, 1903	—	2390 E. 79th St.	Open 1914–1977
34	Cleveland Saint Clair	Cleveland		Apr 4, 1903	—	1368 E. 55th St.	Open 1905–1946, now Goodrich-Gannett Neighborhood Center
35	Cleveland South	Cleveland		Apr 4, 1903	—	3096 Scranton Rd.	Closed since March 2013 but reopened on December 1, 2018.
36	Cleveland Sterling	Cleveland		Apr 4, 1903	—	2200 E. 30th St.	Opened 1913
37	Cleveland Superior	Cleveland		Apr 4, 1903	—	1351 E. 105th St.	Closed 1990
38	Cleveland Woodland	Cleveland		Apr 4, 1903	—	5806 Woodland Ave.	Opened 1904, burned 1957
39	Clyde	Clyde		Dec 2, 1904	$12,500	222 W. Buckeye St.	
40	Columbus	Columbus		Dec 30, 1901	$200,000	96 S. Grant Ave.	
42	Coshocton	Coshocton		Dec 27, 1902	$17,000	4th and Chestnut Sts.	Open 1904–1974, vacant
43	Dayton East 5th	Dayton		Jan 6, 1911	$50,000	2160 E. 5th St.	formerly housed the Dayton Southeast Priority Board (1999-2012), during which time (2008) it received an Ohio Historic Preservation Merit Award; currently being used as the administrative office for the St. Mary Development Organization
44	Dayton West 5th	Dayton		Jan 6, 1911	—	1612 W. 5th St.	Burned in 1979
45	Defiance	Defiance		Nov 25, 1903	$22,000	320 Fort St.	
46	Delaware	Delaware		Dec 27, 1902	$21,500	101 N. Sandusky St.	Now County offices.
47	Delphos	Delphos		May 2, 1911	$12,500	309 W. 2nd St.	Opened 1912
48	East Cleveland	East Cleveland		Dec 20, 1904	$35,000	14101 Euclid Ave.	
49	East Liverpool	East Liverpool		Jun 30, 1899	$50,000	219 E. 4th St.	First (along with Steubenville) Carnegie Library in Ohio
50	Fostoria	Fostoria		Mar 20, 1903	$20,000	205 Perry St.	Opened 1914, extensively altered
51	Galion	Galion		Apr 11, 1902	$15,000	123 N. Market St.	
52	Gallipolis	Gallipolis		Dec 27, 1902	$12,500	61 State St.	Now a school district office
53	Geneva	Geneva		Dec 14, 1908	$10,000	117 W. Main St.	Open 1910–1997, now a courthouse
54	Germantown	Germantown		Dec 20, 1904	$10,000	47 W. Center St.	Closed 1984, now historical society
55	Greenville	Greenville		Mar 7, 1901	$25,000	520 Sycamore St.	
56	Kent	Kent		Aug 16, 1901	$11,500	312 W. Main St.	
57	Kenton	Kenton		Jan 22, 1902	$20,000	121 N. Detroit St.	Now a dentist office
58	Kinsman	Kinsman		Mar 29, 1911	$7,000	6420 Church St.	
59	Lakewood	Lakewood		May 2, 1907	$44,600	15425 Detroit Ave.	
60	Lebanon	Lebanon		Feb 20, 1903	$10,000	101 S. Broadway	Opened 1908
61	Lima	Lima		Jun 21, 1901	$34,000	corner of McDonel and Market St.	
62	London	London		Mar 14, 1902	$10,000	20 E. 1st St.	
63	Lorain	Lorain		Jul 8, 1902	$30,000	329 W. 10th St.	Open 1904–1957. Now home to the Lorain Historical Society which invested $2 million into renovations and reopened both floors in November 2015.
64	Madison	Madison		Jun 1, 1915	$10,000	126 W. Main St.	Open 1919–1974, future home of the Madison Historical Society
65	Mansfield	Mansfield		Mar 27, 1903	$37,000	43 W. 3rd St.	
66	Marietta	Marietta		Jan 2, 1913	$30,000	615 5th St.	Only library in the United States built atop an Indian mound.
67	Marion	Marion		Dec 27, 1902	$30,000	244 S. Main St.	Open 1907–1980, now a Children's Museum
68	Marysville	Marysville		Nov 27, 1906	$10,000	231 S. Court St.	Demolished.
69	Maumee	Maumee		Sep 29, 1915	$10,000	501 River Rd.	
70	Miamisburg	Miamisburg		Dec 24, 1908	$12,500	426 Central Ave.	Designed by Columbus architect Frank L. Packard. Open 1910–1981, now a civic center.
71	Middleport	Middleport		Jan 31, 1911	$8,100	178 S. 3rd St.	Designed by Columbus architect Frank L. Packard. Listed on the National Register of Historic Places, 1986.
72	Middletown	Middletown		Apr 26, 1902	$25,000	1320 1st Ave.	Open 1913–1983, vacant
73	Milan	Milan		Jan 6, 1911	$8,000	19 E. Church St.	
74	Mount Sterling	Mount Sterling		Jan 23, 1911	$10,000	60 W. Columbus St.	
75	Napoleon	Napoleon		Mar 29, 1911	$10,000	845 Woodlawn Ave.	Open 1913–1965, now library storage
76	New London	New London		Jun 11, 1914	$10,000	67 S. Main St.	Opened 1916
77	Norwalk	Norwalk		Feb 2, 1903	$15,000	46 W. Main St.	Designed by Columbus architect Frank L. Packard. Opened 1905.
78	Paulding	Paulding		Jul 13, 1912	$40,000	205 S. Main St.	The first Carnegie library to serve an entire county
79	Pickerington	Pickerington		Jan 27, 1912	$10,000	15 W. Columbus St.	Now houses township historical society
80	Pomeroy	Pomeroy		Jan 27, 1912	$10,000	200 E. 2nd St.	Designed by Columbus architects Richard Z. Dawson Jr. and Harry Clyde Holbrook. Open 1914–1989. Now law offices.
81	Portsmouth	Portsmouth		Jul 8, 1901	$50,000	1220 Gallia St.	Opened 1906
82	Ripley	Ripley		Jan 2, 1913	$10,000	27 Main St.	Opened 1915
83	Rockford	Rockford		Jan 18, 1910	$10,000	162 S. Main St.	
84	Salem	Salem		Jan 22, 1903	$20,000	821 E. State St.	Opened 1905
85	Sandusky	Sandusky		Aug 7, 1899	$50,000	114 W. Adams St.	Opened 1901. On property adjacent to the Library is the former Erie County Jail, built in 1883. In 1996, the Library purchased the Jail from Erie County and embarked upon a $10 million expansion project to renovate and connect the two National Register of Historic Places buildings with new space. The Grand Opening and Rededication of the new Library was held on January 11, 2004.
86	South Brooklyn	South Brooklyn		Mar 27, 1903	$11,800	Pearl Rd. and Devonshire Rd.	Open 1905–1936
87	Steubenville	Steubenville		Jun 30, 1899	$62,000	407 S. 4th St.	First (along with East Liverpool) Carnegie Library approved in Ohio. Opened March 12, 1902. Renovated & Enlarged 2018.
88	Tiffin	Tiffin		Feb 15, 1912	$25,000	108 Jefferson St.	Open 1913–1976, now court offices
89	Toledo Jermain	Toledo		Dec 16, 1905	$125,000	315 Galena St.	Open 1918–1974, now a church
90	Toledo Kent	Toledo		Dec 16, 1905	—	3026 Collingwood Blvd.	
91	Toledo Locke	Toledo		Dec 16, 1905	—	806 Main St.	Open 1917–2007, vacant
92	Toledo Mott	Toledo		Dec 16, 1905	—	1055 Dorr St.	
93	Toledo South	Toledo		Dec 16, 1905	—	1638 Broadway	Open 1918–2004, health care clinic
94	Upper Sandusky	Upper Sandusky	Carnegie Library in Upper Sandusky, OH	Jan 23, 1911	$10,000	224 W. Johnson St.	Designed by Columbus architect Frank L. Packard. Open 1914–1986, now a doctor's office.
95	Warren	Warren		Apr 23, 1903	$28,384	120 High St., NW	
96	Washington Court House	Washington Court House		Dec 30, 1901	$15,500	127 S. North St.	Designed by Columbus architect Frank L. Packard. Opened 1904.
97	Wauseon	Wauseon		Nov 25, 1903	$8,000	117 E. Elm St.	Opened 1906
98	Wellsville	Wellsville		Feb 15, 1912	$10,000	115 9th St.	
99	Willoughby	Willoughby		Dec 13, 1906	$14,500	30 Public Sq.	Opened 1909
100	Wilmington	Wilmington		Feb 4, 1902	$12,500	268 N. South St.	Opened 1904
101	Wooster	Wooster		Feb 2, 1903	$15,000	304 N. Market St.	Demolished 1967
102	Xenia	Xenia		Jan 10, 1902	$23,500	194 E. Church St.	Opened 1908, vacant since the 1974 Xenia tornado. Purchased in 2021 for use as the "Xenia Carnegie Cultural Centre with O’Neil’s Restaurant and Event Venue."
103	Youngstown	Youngstown		Feb 19, 1908	$50,000	305 Wick Ave.	Called the Reuben McMillan Free Library
104	Zanesville	Zanesville		Dec 16, 1905	$54,000	220 N. 5th St.	

== Academic libraries ==
	Institution	Locality	Image	Year granted	Grant amount	Location	Notes
1	Cedarville College	Cedarville		Dec 28, 1905	$11,795	160 N. Main St.	Open 1908–1960, now art studios
2	Heidelberg University	Tiffin		Mar 15, 1905	$25,000	28 Greenfield St. 41°6′55″N 83°10′5″W	Open 1912–1967, now Pfleiderer Hall, houses humanities
3	Marietta College	Marietta		Jan 7, 1905	$40,000	215 Fifth St.	Open 1906–1961, now Irvine Administration Building
4	Miami University	Oxford		Mar 31, 1905; May 2, 1921	$40,000 $50,000	101 Alumni Hall	Designed by Columbus architect Frank L. Packard and built by Henry Karg of Westerville. Called Alumni Hall, it was the school's original library until 1973. Now houses the Department of Architecture and Interior Design.
5	Oberlin College	Oberlin		Jan 20, 1905	$150,000	52 W. Lorain St.	Open 1908–1974, now used for Oberlin College Library storage and offices
6	Otterbein University	Westerville		Apr 3, 1905	$20,000	102 W. College Ave.	Designed by Columbus architect Frank L. Packard and built by Henry Karg of Westerville. Opened 1908. Renamed Clippinger Hall after Walter Gillan Clippinger, longest serving Otterbein president (1909-1939). Now houses Office of Admission. Listed on the National Register of Historic Places, 2021. Carnegie Libraries of Ohio written by Mary Ellen Armentrout, Otterbein Class of 1966.
7	Wilberforce University	Wilberforce		Feb 15, 1904	$17,950	1400 Brush Row Rd.	Open 1909–1976, now part of National Afro-American Museum and Cultural Center

== See also ==
- List of libraries in the United States
