= List of Carnegie libraries in Tennessee =

The following list of Carnegie libraries in Tennessee provides detailed information on United States Carnegie libraries in Tennessee, where 12 free public libraries were built from nine grants (totaling $310,500) awarded by the Carnegie Corporation of New York from 1900 to 1917. In addition, a public library was constructed at a federally owned veterans' hospital, and seven academic libraries were built at academic institutions (totaling $295,000). Tennesseans rejected several proposed Carnegie libraries, including one in 1889 at Johnson City, his first library offer in the U.S. outside Pennsylvania. Other towns that rejected Carnegie libraries included Cleveland, Columbia, Franklin, and Chattanooga (for an African-American branch). For various reasons, Carnegie also refused requests for libraries at Sparta, Knoxville, Clarksville, Martin, and Maryville College. Nevertheless, by 1919, Carnegie had built twenty library buildings in Tennessee, including more academic and African-American libraries than any other southern state. Carnegie also authorized the single largest grant for an academic library on an American university campus in Tennessee. In total, Tennessee ranked fourth in the South in the total number of Carnegie libraries, lagging behind only Texas, Georgia, and Kentucky.

Tennessee's twenty Carnegie libraries were groundbreaking civic spaces, whether located in small towns, large cities, or university campuses. Designed by professional architects, these public facilities were intended to be more than book halls and reading rooms; rather, Tennesseans wanted their Carnegie libraries to serve as community centers, even as "Universities of the People," where men, women, and children of all races and classes could be enlightened, educated, or entertained. Carnegie's free library program was a crucial component of the southern Progressives' mantra that good roads, good schools, and good libraries would build a better New South.

== Key ==
Building still operating as a library
Building standing, but now serving another purpose
Building no longer standing
Building listed on the National Register of Historic Places
Building contributes to a historic district on the National Register of Historic Places

== Public libraries ==
	Library	City or town	Image	Date granted	Grant amount	Location	Notes
1	Brownsville Carnegie Library	Brownsville		Dec 2, 1909	$7,500	121 W. Main St.	Built 1910–1912; open 1912–2002, now Chamber of Commerce; possibly designed by Neander M. Woods Jr., Memphis; rehabbed 1993 Listed on National Register of Historic Places in 2018.
2	Old Library Building	Chattanooga		Dec 27, 1900	$50,000	200 E. 8th St.	Built 1903–1905; open 1905–1940, rehabbed late 1960s for private offices; listed on National Register of Historic Places, 1973; designed by Reuben H. Hunt, Chattanooga, TN
3	Etowah	Etowah		Sep 29, 1915	$8,000	723-725 Ohio Ave.	Built 1915–1916; still functions as a library; also serves as Etowah's city hall; designed by unnamed local architect/engineer/draftsman; listed on National Register of Historic Places, 2003
4	Greeneville	Greeneville		Nov 3, 1913	$10,000	109 West Summer St.	Built 1914–1915; closed 1970s; listed on National Register of Historic Places, 1974; designed by Aaron T. Simmons, Bloomington, IL; also women's rest room until 1975; National Guard headquarters late 1970s; vacant
5	Harriman	Harriman		Nov 20, 1908	$10,000	601 Walden St.	Built 1909–1910; still in use as a public library; listed on National Register of Historic Places, 1989; designed by Paul O. Moratz, Bloomington, IL
6	Jackson	Jackson		Feb 13, 1901	$30,000	305 E. College St.	Built 1901–1903; closed 1968, rehabbed 1981 as an art and history center; listed on National Register of Historic Places, 1975; designed by Anthony Ten Eyck Brown and Frederick H. Brown, Nashville
7	Johnson City	Johnson City		Dec 23, 1902	$16,000		Built 1902–1904, part of Mountain Branch, National Home for Disabled Volunteer Soldiers; now a lecture hall; National Historic Landmark; designed by Joseph H. Freeland, NYC; rehabbed 1998
8	Knoxville	Knoxville		May 15, 1916	$10,000		Built 1916–1918; Free Colored Carnegie Branch, demolished 1965; designed by Albert B. Baumann, Knoxville; closed 1965
9	Nashville Main	Nashville		Jul 23, 1901	$100,000	222 8th Ave. N.	Built 1904; demolished 1963; designed by Albert Randolph Ross, NYC, with Thompson, Gibel & Asmus, Nashville (Supervising Architects); integrated 1949–1954; closed 1963 and replaced with Ben West Library 1963-1965
10	Nashville Carnegie	Nashville		January 31, 1912	$25,000	1001 Monroe St.	Built 1913–1915, still in use as a public library; part of the Buena Vista Historic District, 1980; designed by Clarence K. Colley, Nashville; rehabbed 1981–1983; designated Local Landmark
11	Nashville East	Nashville		January 31, 1912	$25,000	206 Gallatin Ave.	Built 1917–1919, still in use as a public library; listed on National Register of Historic Places, 1982; designed by Clarence K. Colley, Nashville; restored 1998–2000; designated Local Landmark
12	Nashville Negro Branch	Nashville		January 31, 1912	$25,000	220 12th Ave. N.	Built 1916–1918; closed 1949, demolished ca.1969; designed by Clarence K. Colley and Robert Sharp, Nashville
13	Union City	Union City		Apr 8, 1910	$10,000		Built 1910; demolished by WPA, 1938; designed by Henry D. Whitfield, NYC

== Academic libraries ==
	Institution	Locality	Image	Date granted	Grant amount	Location	Notes
1	Fisk University	Nashville		Mar 15, 1905	$20,000	1720 Meharry Blvd. 36°10′03″N 86°48′18″W	Fisk University Carnegie Library, now Fisk's Academic Building; built 1908–1909, listed on National Register of Historic Places, 1977 (African-American University); design attributed to Shepley, Rutan & Coolidge, Boston, and built by Gabriel Moses McKissack III, Nashville; rehabbed 1995
2	Knoxville College	Knoxville		Mar 15, 1907	$10,000	901 Knoxville College Dr.	Built 1909; demolished 1966; Alumni Memorial Library built in same location in 1967 (African-American University); designed by Martin E. Parmelee, Knoxville
3	Lincoln Memorial University	Harrogate		Apr 18, 1904	$20,000	Campus quad 36°34′52″N 83°39′38″W	Built 1904–1906; still in use as an academic library; design attributed to Gideon T. Spencer, Superintendent of Buildings and Grounds, LMU
4	Peabody College for Teachers	Nashville		Jan 11, 1917	$180,000	1210 21st Ave. S.	Built 1917–1919; still in use as an academic library; designated National Historic Landmark, 1965; listed on NRHP, 1966; designed by Edward L. Tilton, NYC; George Peabody College for Teachers merged in 1979 with Vanderbilt University
5	University of Tennessee	Knoxville		Mar 15, 1905	$40,000	1404 Circle Dr.	Built 1910–1911; converted into administrative offices with PWA funds in 1934, demolished above foundations. Now the Austin Peay Building, houses the department of psychology; designed by Patton & Miller, Chicago, with Martin Parmelee, Knoxville (supervising architect)
6	Tusculum College	Tusculum		ca.1908	$10,500	910 Erwin Hwy	Built 1910–1911, still in use as an academic library; listed on National Register of Historic Places, 1981; half of $22,000 grant shared with Washington College; possibly designed by Patton & Miller, Chicago
7	Washington College	Limestone		ca.1908	$10,500	116 Doak Lane	Built 1909–1910, vacant; listed on National Register of Historic Places, 2002; half of $22,000 grant shared with Tusculum College; academy closed 2000

== See also ==
- List of libraries in the United States
