= List of Carnegie libraries in West Virginia =

West Virginia Carnegie libraries

The following list of Carnegie libraries in West Virginia provides detailed information on United States Carnegie libraries in West Virginia, where 3 public libraries were built from 3 grants (totaling $81,500) awarded by the Carnegie Corporation of New York from 1901 to 1907. In addition, one academic library was built. Communities who rejected Carnegie grants often did so because they were unable to raise the 10 percent annual maintenance fee that Carnegie required or they did not have an adequate building site available. The towns of Bluefield and Williamson were both unable to provide a suitable building site for a new library. Leaders in the Charleston community did not think the Carnegie grant was substantial enough to build a library that would adequately serve their population. Officials at the time said Charleston "should have a more commodious library than $45,000 would erect." Carnegie refused to modify the award and a bond proposal to raise more funds in 1915 failed. In Wheeling, labor leaders ensured that the town would not receive a Carnegie award; they effectively boycotted the municipal bond levy due to the deaths of steelworkers at Carnegie's Homestead, Pennsylvania mill during the 1892 strike.

== Key ==
Building standing, but now serving another purpose
Building listed on the National Register of Historic Places
Building contributes to a historic district on the National Register of Historic Places

== Public libraries ==
	Library	City or town	Image	Date granted	Grant amount	Location	Notes
1	Hinton	Hinton		Apr 8, 1907	$12,500	419 Ballengee St. 37°40′30″N 80°53′14″W	The library was built in 1911–12. Now Veterans Memorial Museum
2	Huntington	Huntington		Dec 30, 1901	$35,000	900 5th Ave. 38°25′11″N 82°26′37″W	After opening July 27, 1904, this library served the community until 1980, when a new library opened across the street. This building is currently Huntington Junior College.
3	Parkersburg	Parkersburg		Dec 29, 1903	$34,000	725 Green St. 39°15′57″N 81°33′22″W	Opened on October 5, 1905, this library closed in 1976 when a new library was built. It later housed Trans-Allegheny Books, the largest used bookstore in West Virginia. The bookstore closed in 2010.

== Academic library ==
	Institution	Town	Image	Date granted	Grant amount	Location	Notes
1	Bethany College	Bethany		Feb 16, 1905	$20,000	Cramblet Hall; 40°12′17″N 80°33′36″W	Serving as a library until 1960, this building reopened as Cramblet Hall on June 3, 1961, and has since housed various offices.
