= Cadillac Public Library =

- Wexford County Historical Society Museum
- U.S. National Register of Historic Places
- Michigan State Historic Site
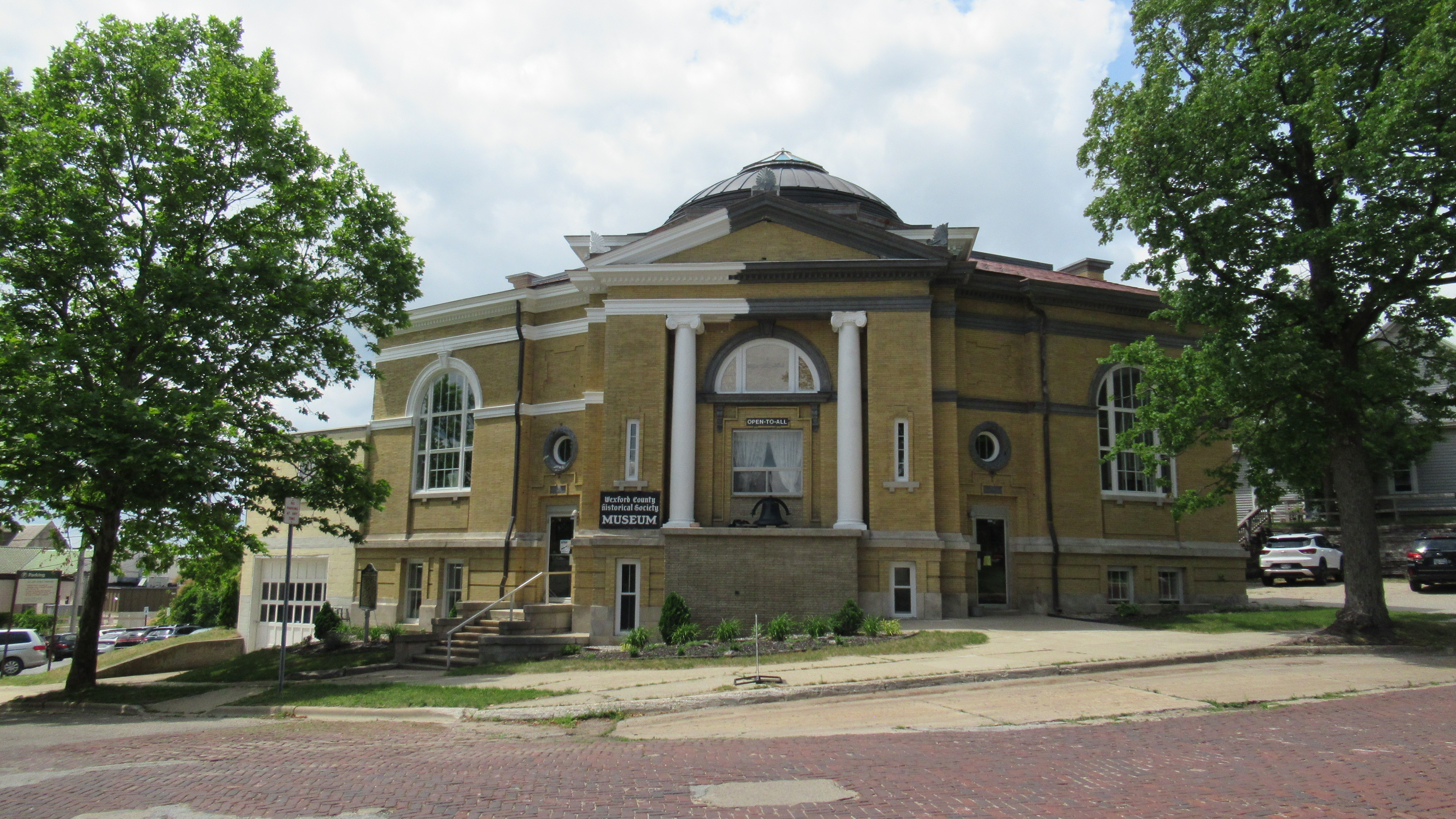

- Location within Michigan Location within the United States
- Interactive map
- Location: 127 Beech St., Cadillac, Michigan
- Coordinates: 44°15′7″N 85°23′55″W
- Area: less than one acre
- Built: 1906
- Built by: Freuchtel Construction Company
- Architect: Scheurmann & Merriam Architects
- Architectural style: Classical Revival
- NRHP reference No.: 07001020

Significant dates
- Added to NRHP: September 28, 2007
- Designated MSHS: November 2, 1980

The Cadillac Carnegie Public Library, now the Wexford County Historical Society Museum, was constructed as a Carnegie Library located at 127 Beech Street in Cadillac, Michigan. It was designated a Michigan State Historic Site in 1980 and listed on the National Register of Historic Places in 2007.

== History ==
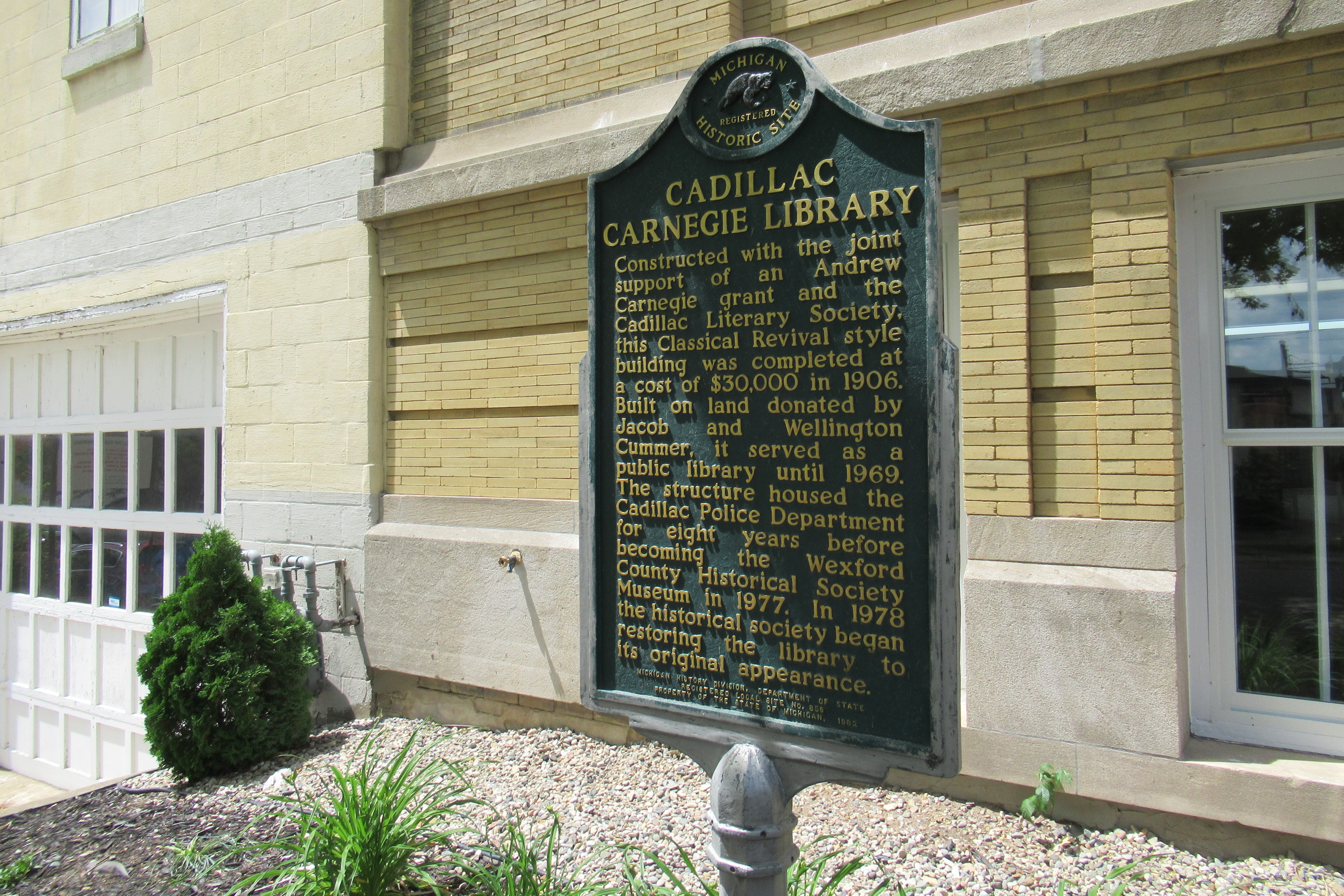
Michigan state historic marker

In 1903, the Andrew Carnegie Foundation agreed to donate $15,000 toward the cost of a new library in Cadillac, subject to the community raising matching funds. The Cadillac Literary Society matched the funds, and in 1904 Scheurmann & Merriam Architects of Saginaw, Michigan were selected to design the building, and Freuchtel Construction Company was selected to be the building contractor. The library was completed in 1906 at a cost of $30,000. The building served as a public library until 1969.

After that time, it was used by the Cadillac Police Department until 1977, after which it was considered for demolition. The city accepted the Wexford County Historical Society's proposal to use the building as a museum, and it became the Wexford County Historical Society Museum.

== Description ==
The Cadillac Public Library is a single story polygonal Classical Revival brick building sitting on a raised stone foundation. It has a shallow-pitched hip roof with a low-pitched dome. The entryway in through a simple door flanked by Ionic columns and surmounted with a semi-circular window.
