= List of Carnegie libraries in Nevada =

The following list of Carnegie libraries in Nevada provides detailed information on United States Carnegie libraries in Nevada, where 1 library was built from 1 grant (totaling $15,000) awarded by the Carnegie Corporation of New York in 1902.

== Carnegie libraries ==
	Library	City or town	Image	Date granted	Grant amount	Location	Notes
1	Reno	Reno		Mar 14, 1902	$15,000	S Virginia St. and Mill St. 39°31′29.25″N 119°48′42.28″W	Dedicated on June 4, 1904, the building was razed in 1931 for post office construction.

== See also ==
- List of libraries in the United States
