= List of Carnegie libraries in North Dakota =

The following list of Carnegie libraries in North Dakota provides detailed information on United States Carnegie libraries in North Dakota, where 8 public libraries were built from 8 grants (totaling $132,700) awarded by the Carnegie Corporation of New York from 1901 to 1916. In addition, academic libraries were built at 3 institutions (totaling $68,400).

== Key ==
Building still operating as a library
Building standing, but now serving another purpose
Building no longer standing
Building listed on the National Register of Historic Places
Building contributes to a historic district on the National Register of Historic Places

== Public libraries ==
	Library	City or town	Image	Date granted	Grant amount	Location	Notes
1	Bismarck	Bismarck		Jan 28, 1916	$25,000	Thayer Ave. and 6th St. 46°48′27.74″N 100°47′1.6″W	Opened in July 1918, this library closed in 1963. It was eventually demolished in 1980.
2	Devils Lake	Devils Lake		Apr 23, 1908	$12,500	623 4th Ave. 48°6′53″N 98°51′37″W	After opening January 21, 1910, this library operated until November 26, 2003, when a new facility opened. It now houses private businesses.
3	Dickinson	Dickinson		Mar 21, 1908	$12,500	139 3rd St., W. 46°52′54.98″N 102°47′13.63″W	Opening January 3, 1910, this library has undergone extensive additions and renovations but remains in the same building.
4	Fargo	Fargo		Mar 6, 1901	$20,000	625 2nd Ave. N. 46°52′47.3″N 96°47′19.02″W	After opening on January 26, 1903, this library served Fargo until 1968. It was razed in 1970.
5	Grafton	Grafton		Feb 2, 1903	$10,000	49 W. 7th St. 48°25′3.75″N 97°24′44.92″W	
6	Grand Forks	Grand Forks		Jul 4, 1901	$22,700	Corner of N 5th St and Alpha/1st Avenue.	Closed in 1972 and razed when new library built.
7	Minot	Minot		Aug 29, 1908	$15,000	105 2nd Ave., SE; 48°14′05″N 101°17′27″W	
8	Valley City	Valley City		Jul 5, 1901	$15,000	410 Central Ave. N. 46°55′35″N 98°00′11″W	This library opened in 1903 and the interior is still almost completely original, including a Tiffany window. It is still in use and is now known as the Valley City Barnes County Public Library. After community fundraising, the 1903 dome was completely restored in 2024.

== Academic libraries ==
	Institution	Locality	Image	Year granted	Grant amount	Location	Notes
1	Fargo College	Fargo		Dec 23, 1905	$20,000	Front St. and S. Broadway St. 46°52′27.71″N 96°47′16.71″W	The cornerstone for this library was ceremonially laid by former President Theodore Roosevelt on September 5, 1910. Fargo College was closed in 1922, however, and the library was razed in 1964.
2	North Dakota Agricultural College	Fargo		Feb 16, 1905	$18,400	1349 12th Ave. North	Now called Putnam Hall.
3	University of North Dakota	Grand Forks		Mar 26, 1906	$30,000	250 Centennial Dr.	Now called Carnegie Hall.

== See also ==
- List of libraries in the United States
