= Delaware Public Library =

- U.S. National Register of Historic Places
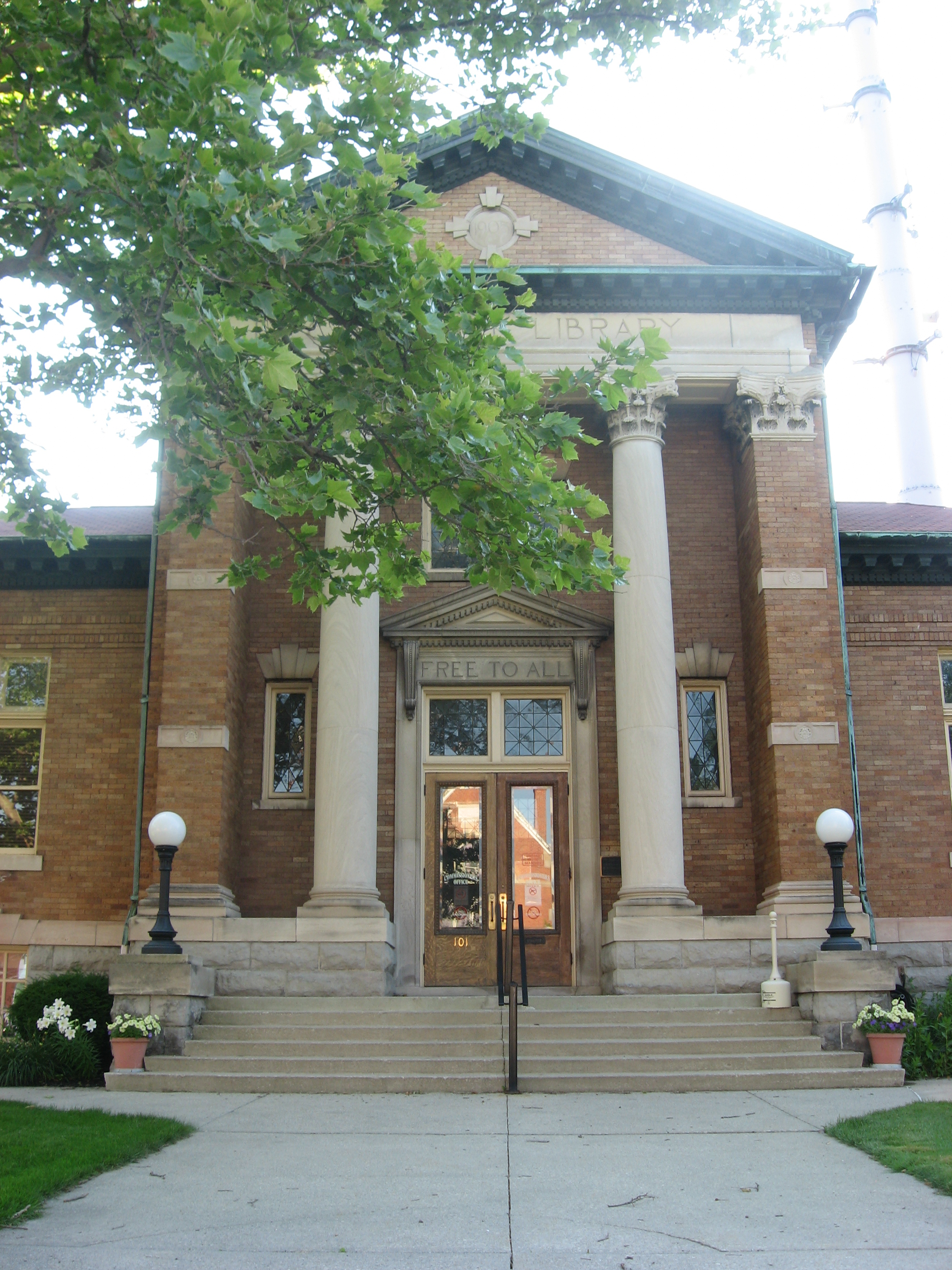

- Location within Ohio Location within the United States
- Location: 101 N. Sandusky St. Delaware, Ohio
- Coordinates: 40°18′08″N 83°03′56″W
- Built: 1904-1906
- Architect: John Marriott
- Architectural style: Classical revival
- NRHP reference No.: 83001957
- Added to NRHP: January 11, 1983

The Delaware Public Library is a former public library in Delaware, Ohio. The building was funded by Andrew Carnegie and built in the neoclassical style. It opened to the public in 1906.

The library's collection of books and volumes rapidly expanded during its operational history. By the 1970s, the Delaware Public Library started to run out of space. In 1984, a new public library was constructed, and Delaware County, Ohio started using the Delaware Public Library for office space. The building was tripled in size during a construction and restoration project that lasted from 1999 to 2001. The Delaware Public Library is currently used to house a number of Delaware County agencies, including the Delaware County Board of Commissioners.

The Delaware Public Library was entered into the National Register of Historic Places in 1983 because of the building's architectural significance.

== Background ==
=== Carnegie library program ===
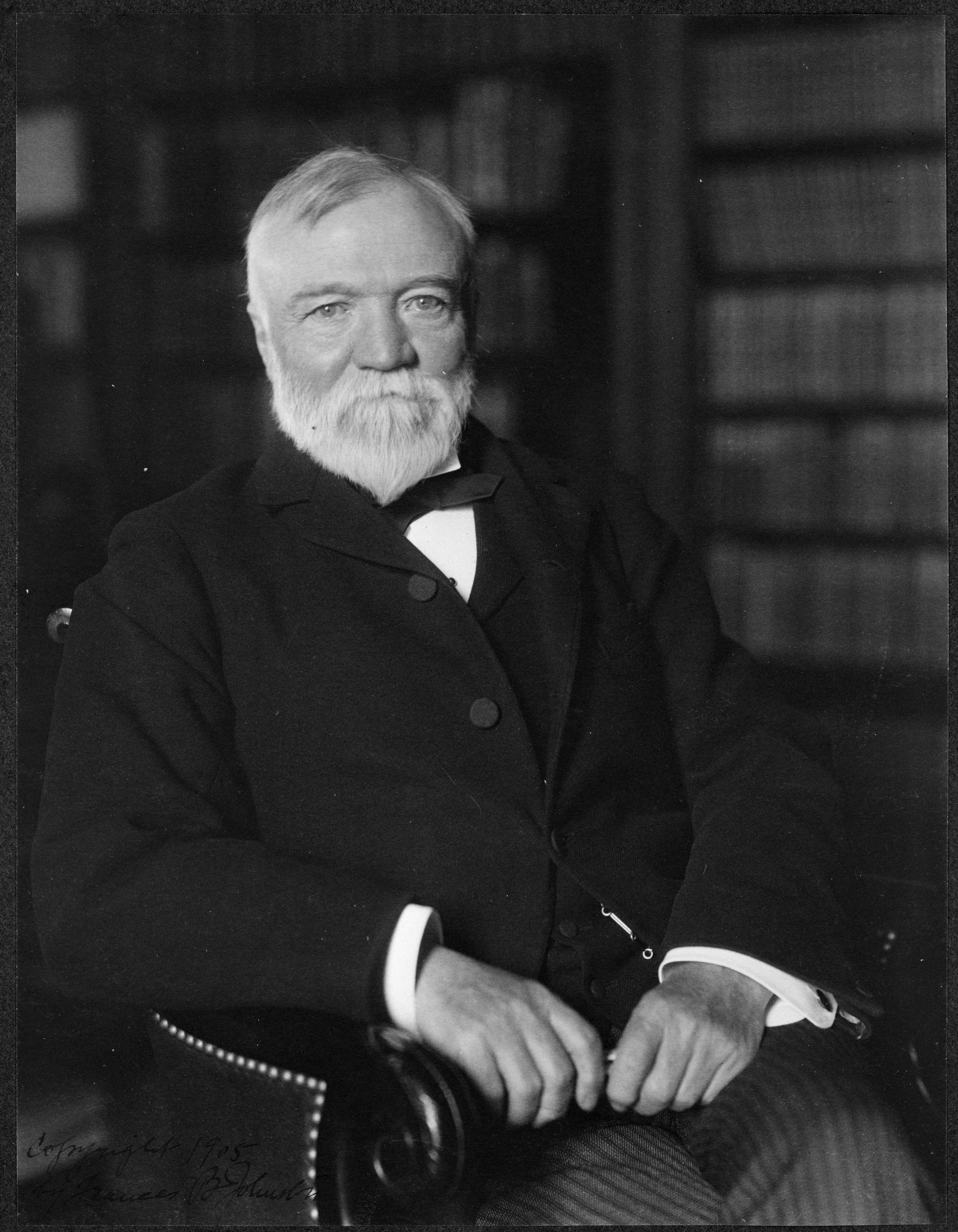
Carnegie in 1905

Andrew Carnegie (1835-1919) was a steel magnate and philanthropist. He was born in Scotland to an impoverished family and dropped out of school at the age of twelve. Carnegie immigrated to Allegheny, Pennsylvania in 1848, and worked in a textile mill and later at Pennsylvania Railroad as a telegraph operator. Carnegie never returned to school, but a local resident allowed Carnegie limited access to his private library. Influenced by his life experience, Carnegie promised that he would fund libraries for members of the working class. Carnegie would go on to invest his earnings in business ventures, and started opening steel mills in the 1870s.

From 1881 to 1919, Carnegie gave away 56 million dollars to build libraries. His grants paid for 1,689 libraries in the United States and an additional 820 libraries across the English speaking world. Within the state of Ohio, Carnegie funded 111 libraries. In order to receive funding, a town needed to provide to provide land for the library and agree to fund the libraries operations; Carnegie's grant paid only for the physical building. Prior to Carnegie's programs, public libraries were frequently fee based and tended to move locations; many communities were unable to fund their fledgling library systems or to provide a permanent home. Carnegie's grants and maintenance requirements fueled the growth of public libraries across the United States.

=== History of the public library system in Delaware County ===
Delaware County, Ohio was founded in February 1808 while Delaware, Ohio was founded in March 1808. Since its creation, Delaware city has served as the county seat of Delaware county. During Delaware city's early history, there were numerous attempts to create a public library system. A corporation for establishing a public library in Delaware, Ohio was formed in 1855, but failed to accomplish its goal. A number of other proposals for a public library were created in the following decades, but these were also unsuccessful.

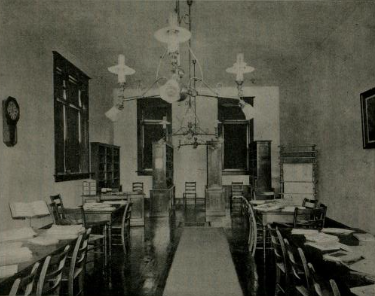
Delaware City's Masonic Temple based library, c. 1900.

The Delaware County library system originated from a late-19th century women's book club, which initially had twenty-six members and a private library of thirty-six volumes. The book club formed a library association in 1897. The club's volume collection was intermediately housed in a doctor's home, a jewelry stored and a rented room. In 1898, the book club re-organized as "The Delaware City Library Association", and focused on creating a library and a reading room. That year, two Delaware residents began planning the design of a Masonic temple; the temple included space for a library and reading room that was offered to the Library Association. On February 23, 1899, the Library Association accepted the offer, and formally incorporated. The Library Association raised funds to heat, light and furnish the room, and to purchase up to date library equipment. The Masonic temple library room was opened to the public on April 5, 1900. The library contained 910 books and volumes when opened, (Note: The total includes 535 books and volumes donated by the Library Association, and an additional 375 books and volumes on loan from the Delaware City Board of Education.) and became immediately eligible for financial support from tax payers. The library collection eventually grew to 1,359 books and volumes.

In early 1902, a citizen of Delaware, Ohio submitted an application for a Carnegie library; the application was accepted on December 24 of that year. The Delaware City Council assumed responsibility for the construction of the library during a January 1901 meeting. The city council took a year to pick the location of the new library and to approve grants to purchase the land. (Note: Delaware city made multiple failed attempts to obtain a location for the library, before successfully purchasing a site in the northern section of the city. The process was also delayed by political in-fighting and changes in council members.) Construction started in the fall of 1904, and concluded in 1906. The city held a dedication ceremony for the Delaware Public Library on September 1, 1906. The ceremony included a duet, performances by an orchestra and speeches by the mayor, the head of the Library's Board of Trustees and a professor from Ohio Wesleyan University. The public was also allowed to tour the library. The Delaware Public Library officially opened on September 4, 1906.

== Description ==
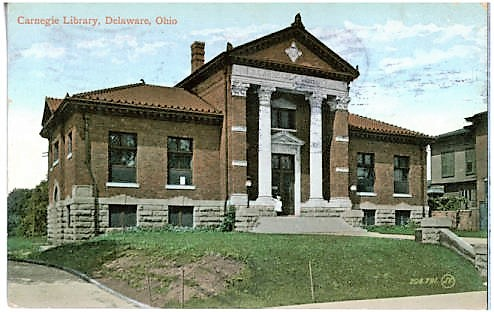
A c. 1914 postcard featuring the Delaware Public Library

The Delaware Public Library was designed in the style of classical Roman architecture. The structure originally consisted of a main hall and two wings, as well as an attic and a basement. The library originally had an area of approximately 8,000 square feet, and was built on a 14,400 square foot lot to make room for future expansions.

The library remained in use until 1984, when it was replaced by the newly constructed Delaware District Library, After 1984, Delaware County used the building for office space. From 1999-2001, Schooley Caldwell Associates (a Columbus preservation firm) expanded and restored the structure. The expansion tripled the size of the Delaware Public Library; most of the expansion occurred behind the original structure.

=== Exterior ===
The Delaware Public Library is built on an ashlar foundation and constructed of buff glazed brick. The exterior of the building is decorated with Bedford limestone trimming and copper cornices.

The library is entered by walking up a set of stairs leading to large, centrally located double doors. Two columns with Corinthian capitals flank the entrance. The words "Carnegie Library" and "Free to All" are carved above the entrance.

The library has a slanted hip roof. The roof was originally constructed of red tiles. However, the tiles were replaced with shingles in 1929.

=== Entrance and main hall ===
The Delaware Public Library is entered through a corridor. The delivery counter was located about fifteen feet from the entrance; the library's stacks were located behind the delivery counter. Delaware County currently uses a replica of the circulation desk as a reception desk for visitors to the building.

A central rotunda with stained glass is located above the circulation desk. The rotunda was covered up by a drop ceiling in 1970 to lower heating costs. However, the drop ceiling was removed during the 1999-2001 renovation, while the rotunda was cleaned and given minor repairs.

In the main hall, all of the side walls within eight feet of the entrance have oak paneling; all of the remaining walls and the ceiling are decorated with green frescoes and gildings. The main hall's floor is constructed of white, green and yellow mosaic tiles.

=== Left wing ===
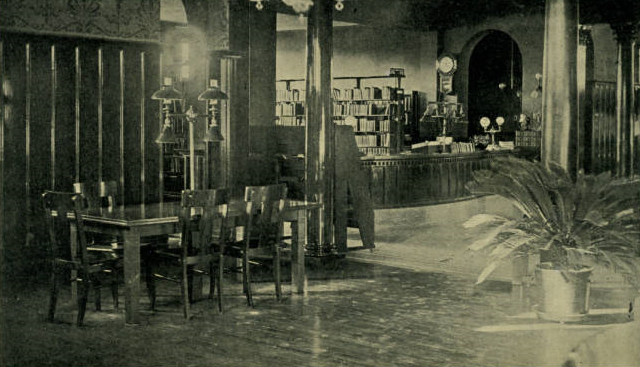
Reading Room of the Delaware Public Library, c. 1910. The main circulation desk and stacks are visible in the background.

The left wing contained the Delaware Public Library's general reading room, which could be entered by passing through an arch that connected the west wing to the main hall. The reading room contained the library's newspaper and magazine collection, as well as the card catalog. The general reading room also contained Mission style furniture, as well as electric and gas lamps. The room's floors consisted of a wooden finish.

The directors' and librarian's office was located to the west of the general reading room. An alcove was located to the North of the reading room. The alcove contained a memorial to Delaware residents who had lost their lives during the Spanish–American War. The alcove also contained books on history and Americans wars. The Spanish–American War memorial was transferred to the Delaware District Library shortly after the newer building opened to the public.

The Delaware County Board of Commissioners currently uses the left wing as a meeting space.

=== Right wing ===
The right wing originally contained a children's room and a reference room. The children's room contained books and magazines aimed towards children, as well as chairs and tables of varied sizes. The children's room has a wooden floor. The walls contain oak paneling, as well as columns and pilasters.

After taking possession of the Delaware Public Library, Delaware County used the children's room for cubicle space. Jane Hawes, writing for the Columbus Dispatch, stated that the cubicles clashed with the "elegant" design of the room. During the 1999–2001 renovation, the cubicles were removed and replaced by traditional furniture more harmonious to the room's design. Since the renovation, Delaware County has used the right wing of the building as a meeting space.

=== Miscellaneous changes to the library's design prior to 1999 ===
A garage was added to the library to house the bookmobile, which entered usage in 1949. The library greatly increased its shelf space as its collections grew.

=== Additions during the 1999–2001 renovation ===
During the 1999–2001 renovation, Schooley Caldwell Associates added an extra 14,800 square feet in area to the Delaware Public Library. The expansion largely occurred behind the original structure, and mainly consisted of additional office space. The new expansion can be entered from the original library, or from handicap accessible side-doors. An elevator and antenna were also included in the new office space. A basement, designed to survive bad weather and other disasters, was added beneath the expanded office space to house Delaware County's Emergency Medical Service, Emergency Management Association and Emergency Operation Center. Schooley Caldwell Associates also converted the library's attic into a second floor.

During the renovation, Schooley Caldwell Associates went to great efforts to preserve the original structure. For example, the firm left the library's original bricks exposed whenever possible. Additionally, the firm designed the new structure to be similar but distinguishable from the original library. The new structure uses bricks that match the color of the old structure's bricks, but the bricks and mortar are different and the mortar joints are thicker. Additionally, the new structure uses colored fiberglass cornices instead of copper cornices.

== History ==
=== Operational history ===
The Delaware Public Library was initially only available to residents of Delaware city. However, non-city residents had the option of buying a three-year pass to gain access to the library. In 1949, the library started using a book mobile to deliver reading material. The bookmobile serviced locations throughout the county, particularly county schools. In 1951, the Delaware Public library became the county's main district library. County residents gained access to the library, which became entirely funded by tax receipts. The city of Delaware initially retained ownership of the building itself; Delaware City ultimately sold the library to Delaware County in 1982.

Throughout its operational history, the size of the Delaware Public Library's collection rapidly expanded. In 1907, the Delaware Public Library housed 4,666 books and volumes in addition to a number of periodicals and newspapers. The library started collecting films for public usage during the 1950s, and musical recordings during the 1960s. By the mid-1970s, the library housed 62 thousand books and volumes, in addition to its collection of films, recordings, newspapers and periodicals. The library was only designed to house 16 thousand books and volumes, so overcrowding and a lack of space greatly impeded library operations. In 1979, the Delaware Public Library Board of Trustees appointed Hoyt Galvin & Associates (a Columbus-based firmed) to analyze the library and recommend ways to expand the structure. The firm concluded that expanding the library would be overly expensive due to updated building codes, and that no expansion plan could address the fundamental lack of available space.

=== Listing on the National Register of Historic Places ===
In 1983, the Delaware Public Library was placed on the National Register of Historic Places for its architectural significance: the library was a well-preserved example of the Neo-Classical architectural style and craftsmanship at the start of the 20th century. The library was also included for being a representation of the Carnegie library program.

The application was submitted by the Columbus Landmark Association. The Association recognized that the county library system was outgrowing the Delaware Public Library, and wanted to ensure that it would be preserved if the county sold it or stopped using it as a library.

=== Later history ===
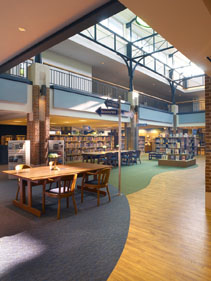
The Delaware County District Library in 2001. The library was greatly expanded in 1991.

In 1983, Delaware County purchased a former Albers supermarket near the site of the Delaware Public Library, and converted the supermarket into a library. The new library opened on the morning of August 20, 1984, replacing the Delaware Public Library as the county's main library.

After the construction of the new library, Delaware County used the Delaware Public Library for office space: the county 911 center moved into the building in 1989, while the Delaware County Board of Commissioners started meeting in the structure in 1991. However, the former library's small size restricted county use of the building. In 1998, the county approved a plan to triple the size of the library and consolidate county operations in the expanded structure. From 1999 to 2001, Schooley Caldwell Associates (a Columbus-based firm) expanded and restored the library.

Following the expansion, most county operations were relocated to new additions to the library. The original structure is currently used for County Commissioner meetings, and reception and meeting places. At present, the Delaware Public Library houses the County's Board of Commissioners, emergency operation center, Emergency Medical Service, Emergency Management Agency, 911 center and the Auditor's Geographical Informational Center.
