= List of Carnegie libraries in North Carolina =

The following list of Carnegie libraries in North Carolina provides detailed information on United States Carnegie libraries in North Carolina, where 10 public libraries were built from 9 grants (totaling $165,696) awarded by the Carnegie Corporation of New York from 1901 to 1917. In addition, academic libraries were built at 6 institutions (totaling $127,868).

== Key ==
Building still operating as a library
Building standing, but now serving another purpose
Building no longer standing
Building listed on the National Register of Historic Places
Building contributes to a historic district on the National Register of Historic Places

== Public libraries ==
	Library	City or town	Image	Date granted	Grant amount	Location	Notes
1	Andrews	Andrews		Apr 13, 1914	$5,000		Demolished in 1979 to make room for a new library.
2	Charlotte	Charlotte		Mar 12, 1901	$40,000	310 N. Tryon St.	Demolished in 1954. New library building opened on the same site in 1956 and a third in 1989.
3	Durham	Durham		Sep 14, 1917	$32,000	311 E. Main St.	Closed in 1980. Building was renovated in 1984 and now houses offices.
4	Greensboro Main	Greensboro		Apr 26, 1902	$40,446		
5	Greensboro Carnegie Branch	Greensboro		Apr 26, 1902	—	900 E. Washington St.	Carnegie Negro Library, built 1924, now part of Bennett College campus
6	Hendersonville	Hendersonville		May 2, 1911	$10,000	4th Ave. and King St.	Closed in 1970, now houses the Henderson County Partnership for Economic Development.
7	Hickory	Hickory		May 3, 1917	$13,250	415 1st Ave. NW	Closed in 1952
8	Murphy	Murphy		May 15, 1916	$7,500	87 Peachtree St.	Now a museum
9	Rutherford College	Rutherford College		Feb 21, 1907	$2,500		
10	Winston-Salem	Winston-Salem		Feb 12, 1903	$15,000	211 W. 3rd St.	Closed 1954, now a church

== Academic libraries ==
	Institution	Locality	Image	Year granted	Grant amount	Location	Notes
1	Biddle University	Charlotte		Dec 23, 1905	$12,500	100 Beatties Ford Rd.	Closed in 1969, now houses student services
2	Davidson College	Davidson		Apr 18, 1905	$20,000	101 Dormitory Dr.	Built 1910, closed in 1941, now college guesthouse
3	Guilford College	Greensboro		Apr 30, 1908	$9,000	5800 W. Friendly Ave.	Built in 1910
4	Livingstone College	Salisbury		Mar 15, 1905	$12,500	701 W. Monroe St.	Built in 1908
5	State Normal and Industrial College (now UNC Greensboro)	Greensboro		Feb 4, 1904	$18,868	401 College Ave.	Closed c.1950, now the Forney Building, houses IT services
6	University of North Carolina	Chapel Hill		Mar 21, 1905	$55,000		Closed in 1929, now called Hill Hall, music department facilities

== See also ==
- List of libraries in the United States
