= List of Carnegie libraries in Utah =

Libraries in Utah, USA

Utah Carnegie library buildings still standing

The following list of Carnegie libraries in Utah provides detailed information on United States Carnegie libraries in Utah, where 23 libraries were built from 23 grants (totaling $255,470) awarded by the Carnegie Corporation of New York from 1901 to 1919. As of 2020, 16 of these buildings are still standing, and 10 still operate as libraries.

== Key ==
Building still operating as a library
Building standing, but now serving another purpose
Building no longer standing
Building listed on the National Register of Historic Places
Building contributes to a historic district on the National Register of Historic Places

== Carnegie libraries ==
	Library	City or town	Image	Date granted	Grant amount	Location	Notes
1	American Fork	American Fork		Sep 26, 1919	$10,000	54 E. Main St.	Last Carnegie library granted in the United States; demolished
2	Beaver	Beaver		Dec 8, 1913	$10,000	55 W. Center St. 38°16′24″N 112°38′29″W	Federal Revival style, built c. 1917
3	Brigham City	Brigham City		Jun 11, 1914	$12,500	26 E. Forest St. 41°30′39″N 112°00′51″W	Prairie Style, completed December 15, 1915
4	Cedar City	Cedar City		Apr 3, 1912	$10,000	Near 20 N. Main St.	Completed in 1914, condemned c. 1947, demolished c. 1969
5	Chapman Branch	Salt Lake City		Mar 31, 1916	$25,000	577 S. 900 West; 40°45′24″N 111°54′58″W	Classical Revival style, dedicated May 1918
6	Ephraim	Ephraim		Jan 14, 1914	$10,000	30 S. Main St. 39°22′05″N 111°35′12″W	Beaux-Arts style, dedicated March 27, 1915
7	Eureka	Eureka		Dec 24, 1907	$11,000	263 W. Main St. 39°57′15″N 112°07′13″W	Dedicated October 13, 1909, extensively altered in 1947; now the Eureka Memorial Building
8	Garland	Garland		Jan 17, 1912	$8,000	86 W. Factory St. 41°44′29″N 112°09′46″W	Classical Revival style, dedicated December 12, 1914
9	Lehi	Lehi		Nov 7, 1917	$10,000	51 N. Center St. 40°23′19″N 111°50′56″W	North wing of the old Lehi City Hall, Mission Style, dedicated December 30, 1921. Now a museum
10	Manti	Manti		Mar 21, 1910	$11,470	2 S. Main St. 39°15′55″N 111°37′59″W	Classical Revival style, dedicated January 2, 1912
11	Mount Pleasant	Mount Pleasant		May 15, 1916	$10,000	24 E. Main St. 39°32′48″N 111°27′14″W	Prairie Style, dedicated February 15, 1917
12	Murray	Murray		Jan 6, 1911	$10,000	184 E. Vine St. 40°39′49″N 111°53′12″W	Demolished March 11, 2020
13	Ogden	Ogden		Mar 9, 1901	$25,000	26th St. and Washington Blvd.	Opened April 21, 1903; demolished February 10, 1969
14	Panguitch	Panguitch		Dec 3, 1915	$6,000	75 E. Center St. 37°49′23″N 112°26′01″W	Built c. 1918
15	Parowan	Parowan		Jan 31, 1913	$6,000		Demolished
16	Price	Price		Jan 2, 1913	$10,000	159 E. Main St.	Finished January 17, 1915. Demolished and replaced by a new library building in 1957
17	Provo	Provo		Apr 8, 1907	$17,500	15 N. 100 East; 40°14′02″N 111°39′25.5″W	Original building completely enclosed by a 1939 WPA-sponsored addition
18	Richfield	Richfield		Jan 6, 1911	$10,000	83 E. Center St. 38°46′06″N 112°04′57″W	American Craftsman style, dedicated May 14, 1913
19	Richmond	Richmond		Sep 27, 1912	$8,000	38 W. Main St. 41°55′23″N 111°48′32″W	Classical Revival style, opened October 20, 1914
20	Smithfield	Smithfield		Jan 7, 1918	$12,000	25 N. Main St. 41°50′14″N 111°49′13″W	Prairie Style, completed in 1921
21	Springville	Springville		Nov 9, 1916	$10,000	175 S. Main St. 40°09′51″N 111°36′36″W	Prairie Style, opened January 1922. Now a museum
22	St. George	St. George		Jan 31, 1913	$8,000		Completed in 1916, demolished in 1981
23	Tooele	Tooele		Jan 5, 1909	$5,000	47 E. Vine St. 40°31′52″N 112°17′48″W	Classical Revival style, opened May 10, 1911. Now a museum

== See also ==
- List of libraries in the United States
