= List of Carnegie libraries in Mississippi =

The following list of Carnegie libraries in Mississippi provides detailed information on United States Carnegie libraries in Mississippi, where 11 public libraries were built from 10 grants (totaling $145,500) awarded by the Carnegie Corporation of New York from 1904 to 1916. In addition, academic libraries were built at 2 institutions (totaling $90,000).

== Key ==
Building still operating as a library
Building standing, but now serving another purpose
Building no longer standing
Building listed on the National Register of Historic Places
Building contributes to a historic district on the National Register of Historic Places

== Public libraries ==
	Library	City or town	Image	Date granted	Grant amount	Location	Notes
1	Clarksdale	Clarksdale	Carnegie Public Library	Nov 21, 1911	$10,000	114 Delta Ave.	Still serving original function as Free Public Library
2	Greenwood	Greenwood		Sep 29, 1911	$10,000	408 W. Washington St.	Closed in the 1970s
3	Gulfport	Gulfport	Gulfport Carnegie Library	May 15, 1916	$10,000	1300 24th Ave.	Building is currently operating as the Gulfport Galleria of Fine Art a 501(c)(3) organization.
4	Houston	Houston	Houston Carnegie Library	Feb 25, 1908	$6,000	105 W. Madison St. 33°53′47″N 89°00′03″W	Still serving original function as Free Public Library
5	Jackson	Jackson		Jan 31, 1911	$25,000		
6	Meridian Carnegie Library (white)	Meridian	Meridian Museum of Art	Dec 2, 1904	$30,000	628 25th Ave. 32°21′50″N 88°42′11″W	Currently houses the Meridian Museum of Art
7	Meridian Carnegie Library (black)	Meridian		Dec 2, 1904	$8,000	2721 13th St. 32°22′10″N 88°42′23″W	Open 1913–1974, demolished 2008
8	Mound Bayou	Mound Bayou		Feb 13, 1909	$4,000		Never used as a library building.
9	Okolona	Okolona		Mar 11, 1914	$7,500	321 W. Main St.	Still serving original function as Free Public Library
10	Vicksburg	Vicksburg	Carnegie Library Vicksburg	Jul 23, 1914	$25,000	819 South St. 32°20′53″N 90°52′51″W	Now houses city offices
11	West Point	West Point	Carnegie Library West Point	Jan 31, 1913	$10,000	510 E. Broad St.	Now houses community development organization

== Academic libraries ==
	Institution	Locality	Image	Year granted	Grant amount	Location	Notes
1	Millsaps College	Jackson		Mar 12, 1906; Nov 22, 1923	$15,000 $50,000	1701 N. State St.	
2	University of Mississippi	University		Mar 15, 1905	$25,000		Built in 1911, now called Bryant Hall. A contributing property to Lyceum–The Circle Historic District

== See also ==
- List of libraries in the United States
