= African-American libraries =

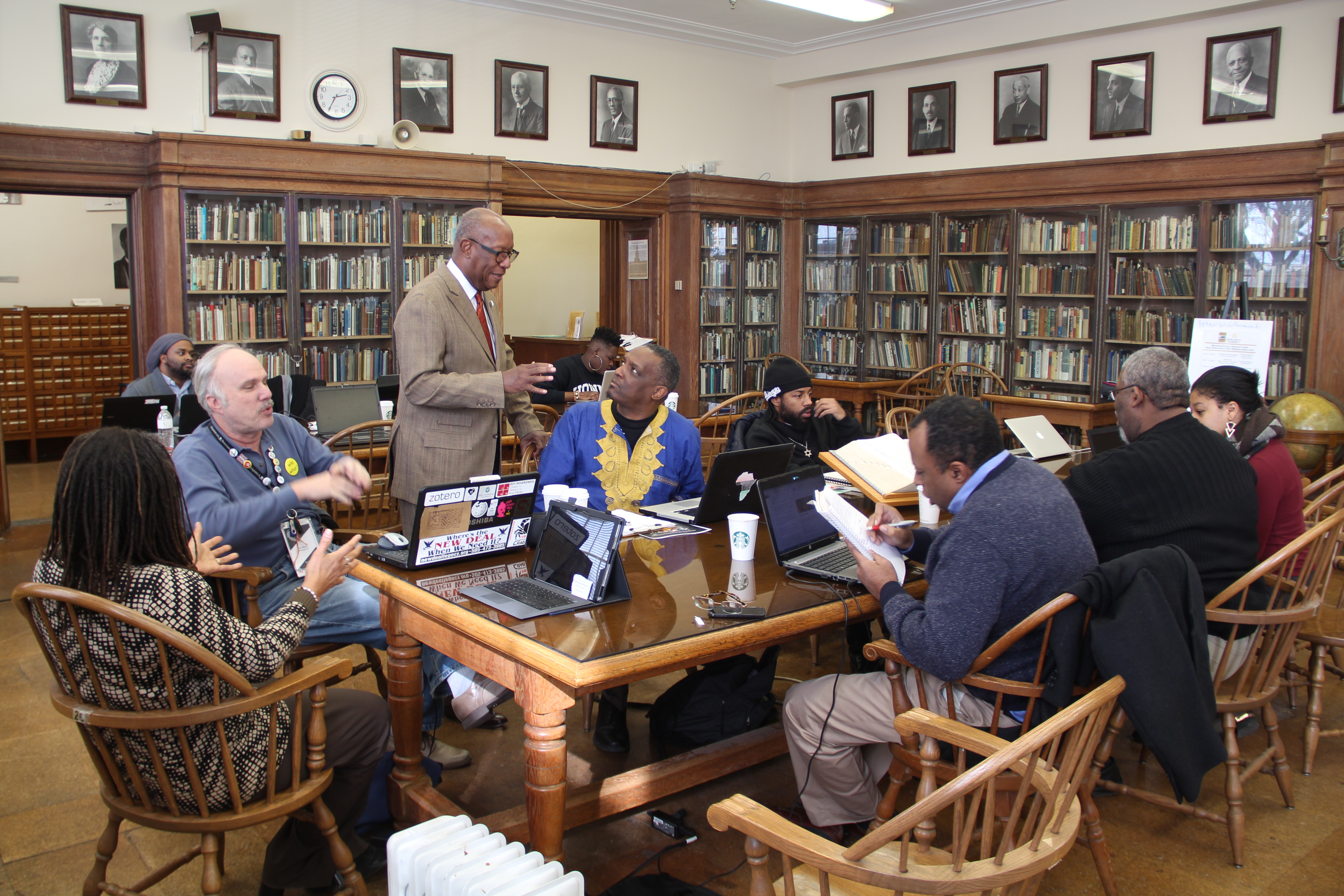
Black History Edit-a-thon at Howard University Library

The history of libraries for African Americans in the United States includes the earliest segregated libraries for African Americans that were school libraries. The fastest library growth happened in urban cities such as Atlanta while rural towns, particularly in the American South, were slower to add Black libraries. Andrew Carnegie and the Works Progress Administration helped establish libraries for African Americans, including at historically Black college and university campuses. Many public and private libraries were segregated until after the U.S. Supreme Court ruling of Brown v. Board of Education (1954).

Books for and about African Americans were scarce in the early 20th century.

== History ==
William Whipper helped found the Reading Room Society established in Philadelphia in 1828 was a social library for African Americans. In 1831 the Female Literary Society, a social library for women, was established in Philadelphia. Enoch Pratt Free Library was integrated. The U.S. Supreme Court upheld the constitutionality of segregating public venues in the 1896 Plessy v. Ferguson decision.

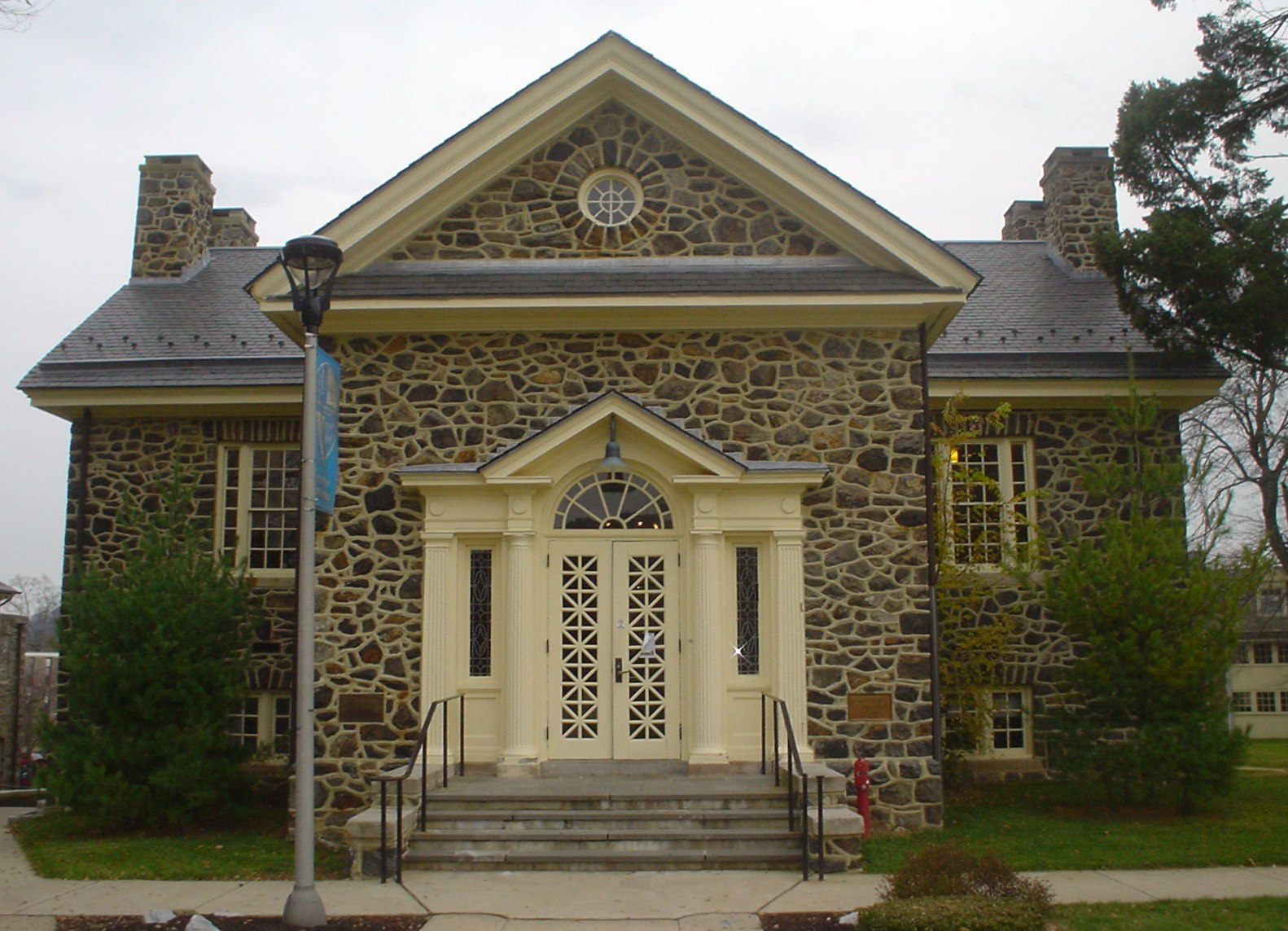
Cheyney University Library

In 1901 a Carnegie Library is built at Tuskegee Institute. In 1926 the Schomburg Center is established in New York City with the collection of historian Arturo Alfonso Schomburg's collection of materials. The library at Cheyney University of Pennsylvania was built in 1909, funded by Andrew Carnegie.

In 1954 the U.S. Supreme Court's Brown v. Board of Education decision ruled "separate but equal" unconstitutional. Eliza Atkins Gleason established a training program for African-American librarians.

Edward Christopher Williams was one of the first professionally trained black librarians. He worked at Western Reserve University in Cleveland, Ohio. Catherine Latimer became a librarian at the New York Public Library and headed its Division of Negro Literature, History and Prints. Dorothy Porter Wesley wrote bibliographies of African-American literature at Howard University. Carla Hayden became a Librarian of Congress.

== List of libraries related to African-American history ==
Libraries in the United States with archives, special collections and research materials related to the history of African Americans include:

- National Museum of African American History and Culture Library
- African-American Research Library and Cultural Center in Fort Lauderdale, Florida
- Blair-Caldwell African American Research Library in Five Points, Denver, Colorado
- Amistad Research Center
- Auburn Avenue Research Library on African American Culture and History in Atlanta, Georgia
- African American History Research Center in Houston, Texas, formerly the African American Library at the Gregory School
- Schomburg Center for Research in Black Culture, a research library that is part of the New York Public Library system
- Moorland–Spingarn Research Center in Washington D.C.
- North Greenwood Library in the North Greenwood neighborhood of Clearwater, Florida
- Robert W. Saunders, Sr. Public Library in Tampa, Florida
- African American Cultural Resource Center at Betty J. Johnson North Sarasota Public Library
- Black Resource Center at Los Angeles County Library at the A C Bilbrew Library in Los Angeles
- Vivian G. Harsh Research Collection of Afro-American History and Literature at the Chicago Public Library's Woodson Regional Library
- Louisville Western Branch Library in Louisville, Kentucky
- African American Museum and Library at Oakland in Oakland, California
- Gainsboro Branch Library in Roanoke, Virginia
- State Black Archives Research Center and Museum at Alabama A&M University
- Langston Hughes Library, Queens Public Library in New York

== See also ==
- List of libraries in the United States
