= List of Carnegie libraries in Colorado =

Coordinates: 38.9972°N 105.5478°W

Colorado Carnegie library buildings still standing

The following list of Carnegie libraries in Colorado provides detailed information on Carnegie libraries in the U.S. State of Colorado, where 35 (Note: Jones erroneously reports this number as 36 in summary tables, though both his gazetteer of libraries and Bobinski confirm 35.) public libraries were built from 27 grants (totaling $749,943) awarded by the Carnegie Corporation of New York from 1899 to 1917. As of 2010, 30 of these buildings are still standing, and 18 still operate as libraries. In addition, the University of Denver was awarded an academic library building on April 16, 1906, with a $30,000 grant.

== Key ==
Building still operating as a library
Building standing, but now serving another purpose
Building no longer standing
Building listed on the National Register of Historic Places
Building contributes to a historic district on the National Register of Historic Places

== Public libraries ==
	Library	City or town	Image	Date granted (Note: At various times, Bobinski and Jones disagree on these numbers. In these cases, Jones' numbers have been used due to both a more recent publication date and a more detailed gazetteer of branch libraries, which are often where the discrepancies occur.)	Grant amount	Location	Notes
1	Alamosa	Alamosa		Mar 21, 1908	$6,000		Dedicated February 24, 1910, closed in 1961, demolished December 1962
2	Boulder	Boulder		Feb 20, 1904	$15,000	1125 Pine St.	Completed in 1906
3	Brush	Brush		Jun 11, 1914	$6,000	500 Clayton St.	Completed in 1915
4	Cañon City	Cañon City		Dec 14, 1901	$13,000	516 Macon Ave.	Built in 1902
5	Old Colorado City Branch	Old Colorado City		Jan 1903	$10,000	2418 W. Pikes Peak Ave.	Completed in 1904
6	Colorado Springs	Colorado Springs		Jan 2, 1903	$60,000	21 W. Kiowa St.	Completed in 1905
7	Delta	Delta		Feb 20, 1911	$6,500	211 W. 6th St.	Completed in 1912
8	Denver Main Branch	Denver		Mar 14, 1902	$360,000 (Note: This number is the total grant for all nine libraries built in Denver.)	144 W. Colfax Ave.	Dedicated February 1910, now the McNichols Civic Center
9	Denver Warren Branch	Denver		Mar 14, 1902		3354 High St.	Completed in 1913, now used for residential lofts
10	Denver Woodbury Branch	Denver		Mar 14, 1902		3265 Federal Blvd.	Built in 1912
11	Denver Dickinson Branch	Denver		Mar 14, 1902		1545 Hooker St.	Completed in 1914, closed in 1954, now houses an architecture firm
12	Denver Decker Branch	Denver		Mar 14, 1902		1501 S. Logan St.	Completed in 1913
13	Denver John "Thunderbird Man" Emhoolah Jr. Branch	Denver		Mar 14, 1902		675 Santa Fe Dr.	Completed in 1918
14	Denver Smiley Branch	Denver		Mar 14, 1902		4501 W. 46th Ave.	Completed in 1918
15	Denver Park Hill Branch	Denver		Mar 14, 1902		4705 Montview Blvd.	Built 1920 in Spanish Renaissance style
16	Denver Elyria Branch	Denver		Mar 14, 1902		1901 E. 47th Ave.	Opened in 1923, closed in 1952, now a private residence
17	Durango	Durango		Jan 16, 1906	$15,000	1188 E. 2nd Ave.	Completed in 1906, now houses city offices
18	Florence	Florence		Feb 3, 1917	$10,000	100 W. 2nd St.	Completed in 1919
19	Fort Collins	Fort Collins		Jan 22, 1903	$12,500	200 Mathews St.	Completed in 1904, closed in 1976. Housed the Fort Collins Museum from 1976-2012. Currently houses the Fort Collins Center for Creativity.
20	Fort Morgan	Fort Morgan		Nov 17, 1914	$10,000	414 Main St.	Completed in 1916, original building surrounded by a later addition
21	Grand Junction	Grand Junction		Dec 21, 1899	$8,000	7th St. and Grand Ave.	Completed in 1901; demolished
22	Idaho Springs	Idaho Springs		Jun 1, 1903	$10,443	219 14th Ave.	Completed in 1904
23	Lamar	Lamar		Feb 6, 1907	$12,000		Completed in 1908, demolished in 1975
24	Leadville	Leadville		Jun 21, 1901	$20,000	102 E. 9th St.	Completed in 1904, became the Leadville Heritage Museum in 1971
25	Littleton	Littleton		Jan 6, 1915	$8,000	2707 W. Main St.	Completed in 1917, now a restaurant
26	Longmont	Longmont		Dec 13, 1907	$12,500	457 Fourth Ave.	Completed in 1913, now houses city offices
27	Loveland	Loveland		May 2, 1907	$10,000	205 E. 6th St.	Completed in 1908, demolished in 1964
28	Manitou	Manitou Springs		Dec 13, 1909	$6,500	701 Manitou Ave.	Completed in 1911. Library services moved to another building in 2021 while the Carnegie building is being updated.
29	Monte Vista	Monte Vista		May 15, 1916	$10,000	120 Jefferson St.	Opened June 1919
30	Pueblo	Pueblo		Feb 4, 1902	$70,000	100 E. Abriendo Ave.	Completed in 1904, demolished c. 1965
31	Rocky Ford	Rocky Ford		Dec 24, 1907	$10,000	1005 Sycamore Ave.	Completed in 1909, now a museum
32	Salida	Salida		Dec 23, 1905	$9,000	405 E St.	Completed in 1909
33	Silverton	Silverton		Jan 19, 1905	$12,000	1111 Reese St.	Completed in 1906
34	Sterling	Sterling		Dec 3, 1915	$12,500	210 S. 4th St.	Completed in 1918, now a private residence.
35	Trinidad	Trinidad		Mar 20, 1903	$15,000	202 N. Animas St.	Completed in 1904

== See also ==
- Bibliography of Colorado
- Geography of Colorado
- History of Colorado
- Index of Colorado-related articles
- List of Colorado-related lists
- Outline of Colorado
- List of libraries in the United States
