= List of Carnegie libraries in Wyoming =

Wyoming Carnegie library buildings still standing

The following list of Carnegie libraries in Wyoming provides detailed information on United States Carnegie libraries in Wyoming, where 16 libraries were built from 16 grants (totaling $257,500) awarded by the Carnegie Corporation of New York from 1899 to 1917. As of 2021, 10 of these buildings are still standing, and 5 still operate as libraries.

== Key ==
Building still operating as a library
Building standing, but now serving another purpose
Building no longer standing
Building listed on the National Register of Historic Places
Building contributes to a historic district on the National Register of Historic Places

== Carnegie libraries ==
	Library	City or town	Image	Date granted	Grant amount	Location	Notes
1	Basin	Basin		Jun 29, 1908	$17,500		Demolished in 1954
2	Buffalo	Buffalo		Jan 14, 1909	$12,500	90 North Main Street; 44°20′53″N 106°41′58″W	Completed in 1909, now a museum
3	Casper	Casper		Feb 13, 1906	$13,000	2nd and Durban Streets	Completed in 1910, demolished in May–June 1970
4	Cheyenne	Cheyenne		Dec 27, 1899	$50,000	22nd Street and Capitol Avenue	Completed in 1902, demolished in 1971
5	Cody	Cody		Apr 13, 1914	$15,000		Completed in 1916, demolished in 1965
6	Douglas	Douglas		Jul 20, 1908	$10,000	300 Walnut Street	Completed in 1911, demolished on September 8, 1966
7	Evanston	Evanston		Feb 20, 1903	$11,000	1020 Front Street; 41°16′07″N 110°57′54.5″W	Completed in 1906, now houses the Uinta County Museum and Chamber of Commerce
8	Green River	Green River		Dec 8, 1905	$20,000	177 North Center Street; 41°31′45″N 109°28′03″W	Completed in 1906, now vacant
9	Lander	Lander		Nov 27, 1906	$15,000	451 North 2nd Street; 42°50′11″N 108°43′41″W	Completed in 1907
10	Laramie	Laramie		Jan 2, 1903	$20,000	405 East Grand Avenue; 41°18′40″N 105°35′31″W	Now houses government offices
11	Lusk	Lusk		May 8, 1914	$11,000	425 South Main Street; 42°45′36″N 104°27′06″W	Completed in 1919
12	Newcastle	Newcastle		Feb 20, 1911	$12,500	23 West Main Street; 43°51′20″N 104°12′11″W	Completed in 1911
13	Rock Springs	Rock Springs		Dec 13, 1907	$12,500	400 C Street; 41°35′01″N 109°13′07.5″W	Completed in 1910, extensively altered
14	Sheridan	Sheridan		Mar 18, 1904	$12,500		Completed in 1905, demolished in 1974
15	Thermopolis	Thermopolis		Apr 3, 1917	$12,500	328 Arapahoe Street; 43°38′50″N 108°12′26″W	Completed in 1919, now houses government offices
16	Wheatland	Wheatland		May 15, 1916	$12,500	904 9th Street; 42°03′24″N 104°57′11″W	Completed in 1917, completely enclosed by a 1965 addition

== See also ==
- List of libraries in the United States
