= List of Carnegie libraries in Vermont =

Vermont Carnegie libraries

The following list of Carnegie libraries in Vermont provides detailed information on United States Carnegie libraries in Vermont, where 4 public libraries were built from 4 grants (totaling $80,000) awarded by the Carnegie Corporation of New York from 1901 to 1911. In addition, one academic library was built.

== Key ==
Building still operating as a library
Building standing, but now serving another purpose
Building listed on the National Register of Historic Places
Building contributes to a historic district on the National Register of Historic Places

== Public libraries ==
| | Library | Town | Image | Date granted | Grant amount | Location | Notes |
|---|---|---|---|---|---|---|---|
| 1 | Fletcher Free Library | Burlington | | Jul 25, 1901 | $50,000 | 235 College St. 44°28′39″N 73°12′36″W | Designed by architect Walter R. B. Willcox of Burlington. This building opened on August 17, 1904. In the late 1970s a large grant was awarded to repair the building, which was later expanded in 1981. |
| 2 | Fair Haven Public Library | Fair Haven | | Jan 19, 1905 | $8,000 | 107 N. Main St. 43°35′51″N 73°15′44″W | Designed by architects McLean & Wright of Boston. This building opened on March 18, 1908, and was expanded in 1997. |
| 3 | Morristown Centennial Library | Morristown | | Mar 18, 1911 | $7,000 | 7 Richmond St. 44°33′47″N 72°35′44″W | This building opened in July 1913, and an expansion was finished in spring 2013. |
| 4 | Rockingham Free Public Library | Rockingham | | Jun 1, 1903 | $15,000 | 65 Westminster St. 43°10′05″N 72°26′43″W | Designed by architects Henry M. Francis & Sons of Fitchburg, Massachusetts, this building was opened in 1909. The grant was initially refused by the town, who did not agree to the annual maintenance tax until 1908. It was expanded in 1929 and 1967. |

== Academic library ==
| | Institution | Town | Image | Date granted | Grant amount | Location | Notes |
|---|---|---|---|---|---|---|---|
| 1 | Norwich University | Northfield | | Mar 18, 1905 | $25,000 | Chaplin Hall; 44°08′21″N 72°39′39″W | Designed by architects Kirby, Petit & Green of New York City with supervising architect Frank A. Walker of Montpelier. It served as a library from its dedication in 1908 until 1991. It now houses the School of Architecture & Art and is known as Chaplin Hall. |

== See also ==
- List of libraries in the United States
