= List of Carnegie libraries in Oklahoma =

The following list of Carnegie libraries in Oklahoma, provides detailed information on United States' Carnegie libraries in Oklahoma, where 24 public libraries were built from 24 grants (totaling $464,500) awarded by the Carnegie Corporation of New York from 1899 to 1916. In addition, an academic library was built at the University of Oklahoma in Norman from a $30,000 grant given on February 20, 1903.

== Key ==
Building still operating as a library
Building standing, but now serving another purpose
Building no longer standing
Building listed on the National Register of Historic Places
Building contributes to a historic district on the National Register of Historic Places

== Public libraries ==
| | Library | City or town | Image | Date granted | Grant amount | Location | Notes |
|---|---|---|---|---|---|---|---|
| 1 | Ardmore | Ardmore | | Mar 20, 1903 | $15,000 | 500 Stanley Street SW | Current location of the Pansy Garden Club |
| 2 | Bartlesville | Bartlesville | | Apr 23, 1908 | $12,500 | 7th and Osage | Currently Law Offices |
| 3 | Chickasha | Chickasha | | Feb 12, 1903 | $10,000 | 527 Iowa Ave | Razed in 1963 |
| 4 | Collinsville | Collinsville | | Jun 1, 1915 | $7,500 | 1223 W Main St | |
| 5 | Cordell | Cordell | | Jan 6, 1911 | $9,000 | 105 E 1st St | Location of Washita County Historical Society museum since 1981 |
| 6 | El Reno | El Reno | | Nov 25, 1903 | $12,500 | 215 E. Wade | |
| 7 | Elk City | Elk City | | Apr 13, 1914 | $10,000 | 221 West Broadway | |
| 8 | Enid | Enid | | Feb 20, 1904 | $25,000 | 402 North Independence Avenue | Razed in 1972 |
| 9 | Frederick | Frederick | | Sep 25, 1914 | $10,000 | 200 East Grand | |
| 10 | Guthrie | Guthrie | | Oct 17, 1901 | $26,000 | 406 E Oklahoma Ave | Now part of the Oklahoma Territorial Museum |
| 11 | Hobart | Hobart | | May 2, 1911 | $10,000 | 200 S Main | |
| 12 | Lawton | Lawton | | Mar 31, 1916 | $20,000 | 5th & "B" Avenue | Currently the home of Arts for All and under the guardianship of the McMahon Auditorium Authority and the City of Lawton Arts and Humanities division |
| 13 | McAlester | McAlester | | Mar 24, 1906 | $25,000 | 325 E. Grand Avenue | Razed in 1973 |
| 14 | Miami | Miami | | Mar 15, 1916 | $10,000 | 200 N. Main | Razed in 1962 |
| 15 | Muskogee | Muskogee | | Aug 30, 1910 | $60,000 | 401 E. Broadway | Currently occupied by Ark of Faith |
| 16 | Oklahoma City | Oklahoma City | | Oct 27, 1899 | $60,000 | 131 Dean A. McGee Avenue | Razed in 1951 |
| 17 | Perry | Perry | | Feb 13, 1909 | $10,000 | 302 North 7th Street | |
| 18 | Ponca City | Ponca City | | Aug 29, 1908 | $6,500 | Grand Avenue and Fifth Street | Razed in 1935 |
| 19 | Sapulpa | Sapulpa | | Jan 28, 1916 | $25,000 | 27 W Dewey | |
| 20 | Shawnee | Shawnee | | Jun 2, 1904 | $15,500 | 331 North Broadway | Now the District Attorney's office |
| 21 | Tahlequah | Tahlequah | | Mar 25, 1905 | $10,000 | 120 S. College Ave | A new building was attached to the Carnegie building and was dedicated in 1978. This new addition currently serves as the primary library facility while the Carnegie building serves as a meeting and special occasion area, still in use by the Tahlequah Public Library. |
| 22 | Tulsa | Tulsa | | Nov 30, 1910 | $55,000 | 3rd and Cheyenne | Razed in 1965 |
| 23 | University of Oklahoma | Norman | | February 20, 1903 | $30,000 | 650 Parrington Oval | Now the Department of Classics and Letters, the Institute for the American Constitutional Heritage, and the Office of Academic Integrity |
| 24 | Wagoner | Wagoner | | Dec 7, 1911 | $10,000 | 102 South State | |
| 25 | Woodward | Woodward | | Dec 3, 1915 | $10,000 | 1207 8th Street | |

== See also ==
- List of libraries in the United States
