= List of Carnegie libraries in Alabama =

Alabama Carnegie libraries

The following list of Carnegie libraries in Alabama provides detailed information on United States Carnegie libraries in Alabama, where 14 public libraries were built from 14 grants (totaling $195,800) awarded by the Carnegie Corporation of New York from 1901 to 1916. In addition, academic libraries were built at 5 institutions (totaling $94,040).

== Key ==
Building still operating as a library
Building standing, but now serving another purpose
Building no longer standing
Building contributes to a historic district on the National Register of Historic Places

== Public libraries ==
	Library	City or town	Image	Date granted	Grant amount	Location	Notes
1	Anniston	Anniston		May 15, 1916	$20,000	Wilmer Ave. & E 10th St. 33°39′25.92″N 85°49′42.27″W	Open 1918–1965
2	Avondale	Avondale		Dec 13, 1907	$10,000		Open 1908–1961
3	Bessemer	Bessemer		Feb 13, 1906	$10,000	321 18th St. N 33°24′8.22″N 86°57′16.86″W	
4	Decatur	Decatur		Feb 12, 1903	$12,000	207 Church St. NE; 34°36′45.11″N 86°58′55.2″W	Open 1904–1976
5	Ensley	Ensley		Mar 25, 1905	$10,000	Corner of Avenue H and 18th St.	Open 1906–1955
6	Eufaula Carnegie Library	Eufaula		Feb 2, 1903	$10,000	217 N Eufaula Ave. 31°53′48.47″N 85°8′44.35″W	Contributing building in Seth Lore and Irwinton Historic District
7	Gadsden	Gadsden		Nov 18, 1903	$10,000	701 Forrest Ave. 34°1′21.17″N 86°2′43.65″W	Open 1906–1964
8	Huntsville	Huntsville		May 8, 1914	$12,500		Open 1916–1966
9	Montgomery	Montgomery		Feb 13, 1901	$50,000	100 S Lawrence St. 32°22′36.71″N 86°18′22.44″W	
10	Selma	Selma		Apr 13, 1903	$11,800	912 Selma Avenue; 32°24′29.55″N 87°1′18.55″W	
11	Talladega	Talladega		Feb 13, 1906	$12,500	200 South St. E 33°26′1.63″N 86°5′59.4″W	
12	Troy	Troy		Apr 6, 1908	$10,000	306 E Academy St. 31°48′35.82″N 85°58′8.8″W	
13	Union Springs	Union Springs		Jan 6, 1911	$7,000	103 Prairie St. N 32°8′28.54″N 85°42′57.98″W	
14	West End	West End		Feb 1, 1909	$10,000	Tuscaloosa Ave. SW & 13th St. SW; 33°29′36.94″N 86°51′12.72″W	Open 1912–1962

== Academic libraries ==
	Institution	City or town	Image	Date granted	Grant amount	Location	Notes
1	Alabama Agricultural and Mechanical University	Normal		Mar 10, 1904	$16,540	Buchanan Way; 34°47′5.07″N 86°34′9.75″W	
2	Alabama Polytechnic Institute	Auburn		Mar 27, 1905	$30,000	W. Thatch Avenue; 32°36′13.86″N 85°29′1.16″W	Now Martin Hall, houses offices
3	Judson College	Marion		Mar 12, 1906	$12,500		Now Bean Hall, houses Alabama Women's Hall of Fame
4	Talladega College	Talladega		Jan 16, 1904	$15,000		Burned in 1963
5	Tuskegee University	Tuskegee		Dec 20, 1900	$20,000		Open 1901–1932, now houses offices

== See also ==
- List of libraries in the United States
