= List of Carnegie libraries in Kentucky =

Kentucky Carnegie library buildings still standing

The following list of Carnegie libraries in Kentucky provides detailed information on United States Carnegie libraries in Kentucky, where 23 public libraries were built from 15 grants (totaling $795,300) awarded by the Carnegie Corporation of New York from 1899 to 1914. In addition, academic libraries were built at 4 institutions (totaling $101,500). As of 2013, 24 of these buildings are still standing, and 7 still operate as libraries.

== Key ==
Building still operating as a library
Building standing, but now serving another purpose
Building no longer standing
Building listed on the National Register of Historic Places
Building contributes to a historic district on the National Register of Historic Places

== Public libraries ==
	Library	City or town	Image	Date granted	Grant amount	Location	Notes
1	Corbin	Corbin		Apr 13, 1914	$6,000	402 Roy Kidd Ave. 36°56′59″N 84°05′38″W	
2	Covington	Covington		Jan 15, 1900	$85,000	1028 Scott Blvd. 39°04′48″N 84°30′26″W	Now the Carnegie Visual and Performing Arts Center containing five art galleries and a theater
3	Henderson	Henderson		Jul 3, 1901	$25,000	101 S. Main St.	
4	Hickman	Hickman		Nov 27, 1906	$10,000	312 Main St. 36°34′18″N 89°11′07″W	
5	Hopkinsville	Hopkinsville		Dec 3, 1912	$15,000	708 Liberty St.	Vacant since the library moved in 1977. Undergoing restoration, to reopen as the Hopkinsville Carnegie Library of Kentucky Architecture
6	Lawrenceburg	Lawrenceburg		Apr 6, 1908	$5,800	108 E. Woodford St.	
7	Lexington	Lexington		Jan 16, 1902	$60,000	251 W. 2nd St.	
8	Louisville Main	Louisville		Nov 11, 1899	$450,000	301 W. York St. 38°14′40″N 85°45′28″W	Main branch of Louisville Free Public Library
9	Louisville Crescent Hill	Louisville		Nov 11, 1899	—	2762 Frankfort Ave. 38°15′16″N 85°41′29″W	
10	Louisville Eastern	Louisville		Nov 11, 1899	—	600 Lampton St.	
11	Louisville Highland	Louisville		Nov 11, 1899	—	1000 Cherokee Rd.	
12	Louisville Jefferson	Louisville		Nov 11, 1899	—	1718 W. Jefferson St. 38°15′22″N 85°46′47″W	
13	Louisville Parkland	Louisville		Nov 11, 1899	—	2743 Virginia Ave.	
14	Louisville Portland	Louisville		Nov 11, 1899	—	3305 Northwestern Parkway	
15	Louisville Shelby Park	Louisville		Nov 11, 1899	—	600 E. Oak St. 38°14′01″N 85°44′44″W	
16	Louisville Western	Louisville		Nov 11, 1899	—	604 S. 10th St. 38°14′59″N 85°46′03″W	
17	Middlesboro	Middlesboro		Nov 20, 1908	$15,000	207 N. 20th St. 36°36′33″N 86°42′53″W	
18	Newport	Newport		Oct 30, 1899	$26,500	401 Monmouth St.	A new library structure for Newport opened in 2004. Today the former Carnegie library hosts the Carnegie Hall event center.
19	Owensboro	Owensboro		Nov 18, 1903	$30,000	901 Frederica Ave. 37°46′02″N 87°06′45″W	
20	Paducah	Paducah		Oct 13, 1901	$35,000		Burned December 30, 1964.
21	Paris	Paris		Jan 2, 1903	$12,000	701 High St.	
22	Shelbyville	Shelbyville		Dec 30, 1901	$10,000	309 8th St. 38°12′45″N 85°13′17″W	
23	Somerset	Somerset		Dec 8, 1905	$10,000	300 College St. 37°05′45″N 84°36′06″W	

== Academic libraries ==
	Institution	Locality	Image	Year granted	Grant amount	Location	Notes
1	Berea College	Berea		Mar 10, 1904	$30,000		Now called the Frost Building, houses classrooms
2	Centre College	Danville		Feb 13, 1913	$30,000		Open 1913–1967
3	Kentucky Wesleyan College	Winchester		Jul 9, 1913	$15,000	15 Wheeler Ave.	County Parks and Recreation
4	University of Kentucky	Lexington		Mar 12, 1906	$26,500		

== See also ==
- List of libraries in the United States
