= Yuma County Library District =

Library system in Arizona, US

- 32.673934°N 114.645896°W
- Location: Yuma, Arizona, United States
- Type: Public
- Established: 1921
- Branches: 8

Access and use
- Population served: 97,908 (City of Yuma); 213,787 (Yuma County)

Other information
- Director: Ashley Jones
- Website: www.yumalibrary.org

The Yuma County Library District (YCLD) serves the population of Yuma County, Arizona. Today, the library district consists of a Main Library located in Yuma as well as 7 branch libraries, which are located in downtown Yuma, the Foothills, Somerton, San Luis, Wellton, Dateland, and Roll. The first Yuma Library, a Carnegie library, opened February 24, 1921 with 1,053 volumes and seating for 20 persons. Located in Sunset Park, the Yuma Carnegie Library underwent several expansions and renovations over the years, including a $4.2 million renovation completed in 2009. The Yuma Carnegie library still operates today as the Heritage Branch Library in downtown Yuma.

Each library features books, magazines, newspapers, reference materials, CDs, DVDs, Internet access, printing, and copying services. Programs and classes for all ages are offered throughout the year, including storytimes, summer reading, technology training and assistance, and topics of local interest.

== Background ==
The Library District's mission statement is "Yuma County Library District is your center for information, community enrichment, recreational reading, and lifelong learning." Its official slogan is "Your Information Connection."

The County Board of Supervisors serves as the Library District Board of Directors. The Board of Directors is the five elected members of the Yuma County Board of Supervisors. They appoint the Library District Director, establish salaries, approve contracts and the annual budget, and review and approve all policies for the Library District. Since the Library District is a special taxing district, the Board of Directors has the authority to set the Library District’s tax rate.

The Board of Trustees consists of nine members who are appointed by the Yuma County Library District Board of Directors. Board of Trustee positions are honorary and without compensation. Their primary function is to promote the development and improvement of Library District services. The Trustees recommend library policies to the Yuma County Library District Board of Directors.

The Library District is primarily funded by real property taxes. It is also supported by non-profit organizations such as Friends of Yuma County Libraries, Inc. and the Yuma Library Foundation, whose purpose is to support the district through fundraising and public awareness efforts.

The Yuma County Library District celebrated its Centennial in 2021, marking 100 years of service to Yuma County

== Main Library ==
The 80,000-square-foot (7,400 m^{2}) Yuma Main Library opened on May 21, 2009 and was funded by part of a $53.7 million library bond program approved by voters in 2005.

The Main Library has four meeting rooms, a special archival collection housed in the Arizona Room, and the Yuma Nonprofit Resource Center, which is a collaboration between the Yuma County Library District, the Yuma Area Nonprofit Institute, and the Arizona Chapter of the American Association of Grant Writers.

The Main Library also houses a locally-run café, a Friends of the Libraries shop, and a Yuma Police Department Substation. As of February 2023, the Main Library also houses a Media Studio room setup for recording audio and video for podcasts, social media and the like.

== Heritage Library & Archives ==
The original Carnegie library still stands at its original 1921 location and operates today as the Heritage Library. Renovated in 2009. This location is also home to a local history archive which contains multiple collections of documents and artifacts from Yuma's past.

== Dateland & Roll Libraries ==
Both the Dateland and Roll Libraries were co-located inside county schools, and typically closed during part of the summer holiday when classes are not in session.

The Dateland Library was located inside Dateland Elementary School while the Roll Branch is housed inside the Mohawk Valley School.

In 2026, the district terminated their contract with both Dateland and Roll, at which time these libraries returned to being only school libraries and no longer part of the system.
