= List of Carnegie libraries in South Carolina =

The following list of Carnegie libraries in South Carolina provides detailed information on United States Carnegie libraries in South Carolina, where 14 public libraries were built from 14 grants (totaling $124,700) awarded by the Carnegie Corporation of New York from 1903 to 1916. In addition, academic libraries were built at 4 institutions (totaling $65,000).

== Key ==
Building still operating as a library
Building standing, but now serving another purpose
Building no longer standing
Building listed on the National Register of Historic Places
Building contributes to a historic district on the National Register of Historic Places

== Public libraries ==
	Library	City or town	Image	Date granted	Grant amount	Location	Notes
1	Anderson	Anderson		Mar 14, 1905	$18,700	405 N. Main St.	Open 1908–1971, now an arts center
2	Beaufort	Beaufort		Sep 25, 1914	$7,500	701 Craven St.	Open 1918–1964
3	Camden	Camden		Nov 17, 1914	$5,000	1314 Broad St.	Open 1916–1973, now a museum
4	Charleston	Charleston		Feb 26, 1914	$5,000	164 King St.	Not a public library
5	Darlington	Darlington		May 15, 1916	$10,000	127 N. Main St.	Open 1920–1988
6	Gaffney	Gaffney		Apr 2, 1913	$7,500	210 N. Limestone St.	Open 1914–1972, now county offices
7	Greenwood	Greenwood		May 15, 1916	$12,500		Open 1917–1958, demolished in the 1960s
8	Honea Path	Honea Path		Mar 7, 1907	$5,000	318 N. Shirley Ave.	Opened 1908
9	Kingstree	Kingstree		Apr 19, 1915	$6,000	135 Hampton Ave.	Open 1917–2001, now a museum
10	Latta	Latta		Apr 3, 1912	$5,000	101 N. Marion St.	Opened 1914
11	Marion	Marion		Nov 16, 1904	$7,500	101 E. Court St.	Opened 1906
12	Spartanburg	Spartanburg		Jun 23, 1903	$15,000		Opened 1906, demolished c.1956
13	Sumter	Sumter		Sep 29, 1915	$10,000	219 W. Liberty St.	Open 1917–1968, now the county genealogical society
14	Union	Union	Carnegie Free Library	Jan 13, 1903	$10,000	300 E. South St.	Opened 1905

== Academic libraries ==
	Institution	Locality	Image	Date granted	Grant amount	Location	Notes
1	Benedict College	Columbia		Mar 15, 1904	$6,000		Replaced by Starks Center in 1937
2	Converse College	Spartanburg		Mar 17, 1904	$10,000	140 N Fairview Ave	Open 1905–1951, now offices
3	Furman University	Greenville		Mar 15, 1905	$19,000		Open 1906, demolished 1961 after the university moved
4	Winthrop College	Rock Hill		Feb 27, 1904	$30,000	1898 Alumni Dr.	Open 1905–1961, now the Rutledge Building, houses art classes and galleries

== See also ==
- List of libraries in the United States
