= List of Carnegie libraries in New Hampshire =

New Hampshire Carnegie libraries

The following list of Carnegie libraries in New Hampshire provides detailed information on United States Carnegie libraries in New Hampshire, where 9 public libraries were built from 9 grants (totaling $134,000) awarded by the Carnegie Corporation of New York from 1902 to 1907. In addition, one academic library was built.

== Key ==
Building still operating as a library
Building standing, but now serving another purpose
Building contributes to a historic district on the National Register of Historic Places

== Public libraries ==
	Library	City or town	Image	Date granted	Grant amount	Location	Notes
1	Berlin Public Library	Berlin		Dec 27, 1902	$17,000	270 Main St. 44°28′21″N 71°10′42″W	Designed by architect Archibald I. Lawrence and built by contractors Stewart & Snodgrass of Berlin. Possibly based on the E. C. Scranton Memorial Library of Madison, Connecticut, designed by Henry Bacon.
2	Fiske Free Library	Claremont		Jan 13, 1903	$15,000	108 Broad St. 43°22′20″N 72°20′12″W	Designed by architects Henry M. Francis & Sons of Fitchburg, Massachusetts, this library was expanded in 1922 and renovated in 1966.
3	Dover	Dover		Apr 26, 1902	$30,000	73 Locust St. 43°11′36″N 70°52′32″W	Designed by architects Randlett & Griffin of Concord, this building was dedicated July 19, 1905, and underwent a major renovation in the late 1980s.
4	Franklin	Franklin		Nov 25, 1903	$15,000	310 Central St. 43°26′40″N 71°38′49″W	Designed by architects McLean & Wright of Boston.
5	Lebanon	Lebanon		Dec 13, 1907	$12,500	9 E. Park St. 43°38′37″N 72°15′00″W	Designed by architects McLean & Wright of Boston.
6	Littleton	Littleton		Mar 14, 1902	$15,000	92 Main St. 44°18′26″N 71°46′24″W	Designed by architect Robert Coit of Boston in the Classical Revival style and opened in 1906, the library's interior was renovated in 1959-1960.
7	Dudley-Tucker Library	Raymond		May 15, 1906	$2,000	9 Epping St. 43°02′14″N 71°10′56″W	Opening October 1, 1908, this library was significantly expanded in 1993.
8	Rochester	Rochester		Dec 22, 1903	$20,000	65 S. Main St. 43°18′08″N 70°58′29″W	Designed by architects Randlett & Griffin of Concord in the Georgian Revival style and opened October 2, 1905, this library built additions in 1941 and 1996.
9	Whitefield	Whitefield		Apr 23, 1903	$7,500	8 Lancaster Rd. 44°22′29″N 71°36′41″W	Designed by architect J. Lawrence Berry of Boston and dedicated September 6, 1904, this building remains largely the same today with the exception of a 1990 basement renovation, and a 2012 addition which included handicapped accessibility.

== Academic library ==
	Institution	Town	Image	Date granted	Grant amount	Location	Notes
1	New Hampshire College of Agriculture and the Mechanic Arts	Durham		Mar 31, 1905	$20,000	95 Main St. 43°08′08″N 70°55′51″W	Designed by architect Albert Randolph Ross of New York City. Located on the campus of the eventual University of New Hampshire, the Hamilton Smith library was opened June 3, 1907, and served in this capacity until 1958. It now houses various offices.

== See also ==
- List of libraries in the United States
