= List of Carnegie libraries in South Dakota =

The following list of Carnegie libraries in South Dakota provides detailed information on United States Carnegie libraries in South Dakota, where 25 public libraries were built from 25 grants (totaling $254,000) awarded by the Carnegie Corporation of New York from 1901 to 1917. In addition, academic libraries were built at 2 institutions (totaling $57,000).

== Key ==
Building still operating as a library
Building standing, but now serving another purpose
Building no longer standing
Building listed on the National Register of Historic Places
Building contributes to a historic district on the National Register of Historic Places

== Public libraries ==
| | Library | City or town | Image | Date granted | Grant amount | Location | Notes |
|---|---|---|---|---|---|---|---|
| 1 | Aberdeen | Aberdeen | | Mar 14, 1901 | $15,000 | | Open 1902–1950 |
| 2 | Armour | Armour | | Feb 26, 1914 | $7,500 | 915 Main St. | |
| 3 | Britton | Britton | | May 8, 1914 | $7,500 | | Open 1921–2002, demolished for school expansion |
| 4 | Brookings | Brookings | | Dec 13, 1907 | $10,000 | 524 4th St. | Open 1915–1976, now the Brookings Arts Council |
| 5 | Canton | Canton | | Dec 2, 1904 | $10,000 | | Now a day care center |
| 6 | Dallas | Dallas | | Apr 28, 1913 | $5,000 | 405 Main St. | Opened September 18, 1914 |
| 7 | Deadwood | Deadwood | | Apr 11, 1902 | $15,000 | 435 Williams St. | |
| 8 | Dell Rapids | Dell Rapids | | Nov 20, 1908 | $6,000 | 513 N. Orleans Ave. | |
| 9 | Hot Springs | Hot Springs | | Mar 9, 1907 | $10,000 | 145 N. Chicago St. | Now an insurance office |
| 10 | Huron | Huron | | Dec 13, 1907 | $10,000 | | Open 1909–1965 |
| 11 | Lake Andes Carnegie Library | Lake Andes | | Nov 21, 1911 | $5,000 | 500 Main St. | Listed on National Register of Historic Places in 2000, still in operation in 2022. |
| 12 | Madison | Madison | | Jan 16, 1906 | $10,000 | 209 E. Center St. | |
| 13 | Milbank | Milbank | | Apr 11, 1905 | $7,000 | 211 S. 3rd St. | Closed 1979, now a museum |
| 14 | Mitchell | Mitchell | | Jan 10, 1902 | $12,000 | 119 W. 3rd Ave. | Now houses historical and genealogical societies |
| 15 | Pierre | Pierre | | Mar 20, 1903 | $12,500 | | Open 1905–1972. Heavily damaged by fire in 1994, demolished 1995 |
| 16 | Rapid City | Rapid City | | Mar 11, 1914 | $12,500 | 604 Kansas City St. | |
| 17 | Redfield | Redfield | | Mar 14, 1902 | $10,000 | 5 E. 5th Ave. | Opened in 1902 |
| 18 | Sioux Falls | Sioux Falls | | Jan 24, 1901 | $30,000 | 235 W. 10th St. | Open 1903–1972, now the town hall |
| 19 | Sisseton | Sisseton | | Jun 11, 1914 | $7,500 | 215 Oak St. E | |
| 20 | Tyndall | Tyndall | | Dec 3, 1915 | $7,500 | 110 W. 17th Ave. | |
| 21 | Vermillion | Vermillion | | Feb 20, 1903 | $10,000 | 12 Church St. | |
| 22 | Wagner | Wagner | | Jun 1, 1915 | $5,000 | | |
| 23 | Watertown | Watertown | | Apr 13, 1903 | $10,000 | 27 1st Ave. SE | Open 1906–1967, now a museum |
| 24 | Wessington Springs | Wessington Springs | | May 3, 1917 | $7,000 | 109 W. Main St. | |
| 25 | Yankton | Yankton | | Mar 14, 1902 | $12,000 | 4th and Capitol Sts. | |

== Academic libraries ==
| | Institution | Locality | Image | Date granted | Grant amount | Location | Notes |
|---|---|---|---|---|---|---|---|
| 1 | University of South Dakota | Vermillion | | Feb 2, 1906 | $40,000 | 350 E. Clark St. | Now the National Music Museum |
| 2 | Yankton College | Yankton | | Feb 2, 1904 | $17,000 | About 1048 Douglas Ave. 42°52′48″N 97°23′27″W | Became the Art Building in 1970. Part of Federal Prison Camp, Yankton since 1988 |

== See also ==
- List of libraries in the United States
