= List of Carnegie libraries in Virginia =

Virginia Carnegie libraries

The following list of Carnegie libraries in Virginia provides detailed information on United States Carnegie libraries in Virginia, where 3 public libraries were built from 2 grants (totaling $78,000) awarded by the Carnegie Corporation of New York from 1901 to 1914. In addition, academic libraries were built at 4 institutions (totaling $175,000).

== Key ==
Building still operating as a library
Building standing, but now serving another purpose
Building no longer standing
Building listed on the National Register of Historic Places
Building contributes to a historic district on the National Register of Historic Places

== Public libraries ==
	Library	City or town	Image	Date granted	Grant amount	Location	Notes
1	Norfolk Main	Norfolk		Mar 8, 1901	$50,000	345 W. Freemason St. 36°51′07″N 76°17′44″W	Designed by Herbert G. Hale and Henry G. Morse, the Norfolk library has, since 1970, served as office space.
2	Norfolk Van Wyck	Norfolk		Mar 8, 1901	$20,000	345 Shirley Ave. 36°52′28″N 76°17′26″W	This library was funded by a Carnegie grant and a donation from H.D. Van Wyck in 1901, but did not open until May 15, 1916. It was designed by Ferguson, Calrow, and Wren.
3	Waynesboro	Waynesboro		Feb 26, 1914	$8,000	301 Walnut Ave. 38°04′02″N 78°53′35″W	Part of Fishburne Military School since 1984, this building was designed by T. J. Collins & Sons. Now used for JROTC classrooms.

== Academic libraries ==
	Institution	Locality	Image	Date granted	Grant amount	Location	Notes
1	The College of William & Mary	Williamsburg		Mar 31, 1905; Dec 14, 1921	$20,000 $25,000		Open 1909–1966, now Tucker Hall
2	Manassas Industrial Institute	Manassas		Apr 16, 1908	$15,000		Only entrance arch remains
3	Randolph-Macon College	Ashland		May 2, 1921	$60,000		Now Peele Hall
4	Washington and Lee University	Lexington		Mar 15, 1905	$55,000		Open 1908–1979, known as Huntley Hall, now houses the Williams School of Commerce

== See also ==
- List of libraries in the United States
