= List of Carnegie libraries in New Mexico =

New Mexico Carnegie libraries

The following list of Carnegie libraries in New Mexico provides detailed information on United States Carnegie libraries in the Territory of New Mexico, where 3 libraries were built from 3 grants (totaling $32,000) awarded by the Carnegie Corporation of New York from 1902 to 1911.

== Key ==
Building still operating as a library
Building standing, but now serving another purpose
Building no longer standing
Building contributes to a historic district on the National Register of Historic Places

== Carnegie libraries ==
	Library	City or town	Image	Date granted	Grant amount	Location	Notes
1	Las Vegas	Las Vegas		Mar 14, 1902	$10,000	500 National Ave. 35°35′55″N 105°12′55″W	Similar in architecture and style to Thomas Jefferson's Monticello, this work has served as a library since its opening in 1904.
2	Raton	Raton		Jan 23, 1911	$12,000	Ripley Park; 36°54′19″N 104°26′17″W	This building opened September 17, 1912, and was razed in 1969 when the library moved to a larger facility.
3	Roswell	Roswell		Jun 1, 1903	$10,000	123 W. 3rd St. 33°23′43″N 104°31′23″W	This 1906 building was a library until 1978, and it is now vacant.

== See also ==
- List of libraries in the United States
