= List of Carnegie libraries in Maryland =

The following list of Carnegie libraries in Maryland provides detailed information on United States Carnegie libraries in Maryland, where 14 libraries were built from 1 grant (for Baltimore, totaling $500,000) awarded by the Carnegie Corporation of New York in 1906.

== Key ==
Building still operating as a library
Building standing, but now serving another purpose
Building no longer standing
Building listed on the National Register of Historic Places

== Carnegie libraries ==
	Library	City or town	Image	Date granted	Grant amount	Location	Notes
1	Baltimore Brooklyn	Baltimore		Nov 10, 1906	$500,000		Closed in 1965
2	Baltimore Clifton	Baltimore		Nov 10, 1906	—	2001 N. Wolfe St.	Built 1916
3	Baltimore Easterwood	Baltimore		Nov 10, 1906	—	2217 W. North Ave.	
4	Baltimore Fells Point	Baltimore		Nov 10, 1906	—	606 S. Ann St.	Built 1922
5	Baltimore Forest Park	Baltimore		Nov 10, 1906	—	3023 Garrison Blvd.	Built 1909
6	Baltimore Govans	Baltimore		Nov 10, 1906	—	5714 Bellona Ave.	Built 1921
7	Baltimore Hamilton	Baltimore		Nov 10, 1906	—	3006 Hamilton Ave.	Built 1920
8	Baltimore Keyworth	Baltimore		Nov 10, 1906	—	2610 Keyworth Ave.	Built 1912
9	Baltimore Locust Point	Baltimore		Nov 10, 1906	—	Corner of Towson St. and Beason St.	
10	Baltimore Mount Clare	Baltimore		Nov 10, 1906	—	Corner of Carroll St. and Barre St.	Built 1909
11	Baltimore Mt. Washington	Baltimore		Nov 10, 1906	—	Corner of Smith Ave. and Greely Rd.	Built 1921
12	Baltimore Patterson Park	Baltimore		Nov 10, 1906	—	158 N. Linwood Ave.	
13	Baltimore South Central	Baltimore		Nov 10, 1906	—	4 S. Central Ave.	Built 1921
14	Baltimore Waverly	Baltimore		Nov 10, 1906	—	1443 Gorsuch Ave.	

== See also ==
- Enoch Pratt Free Library, the pre-existing library system to which Carnegie contributed
- List of libraries in the United States
