= List of Carnegie libraries in Washington =

List of Carnegie libraries in Washington may refer to:

- List of Carnegie libraries in Washington (state)
- List of Carnegie libraries in Washington, D.C.
