= Queen Anne Masonic Lodge =

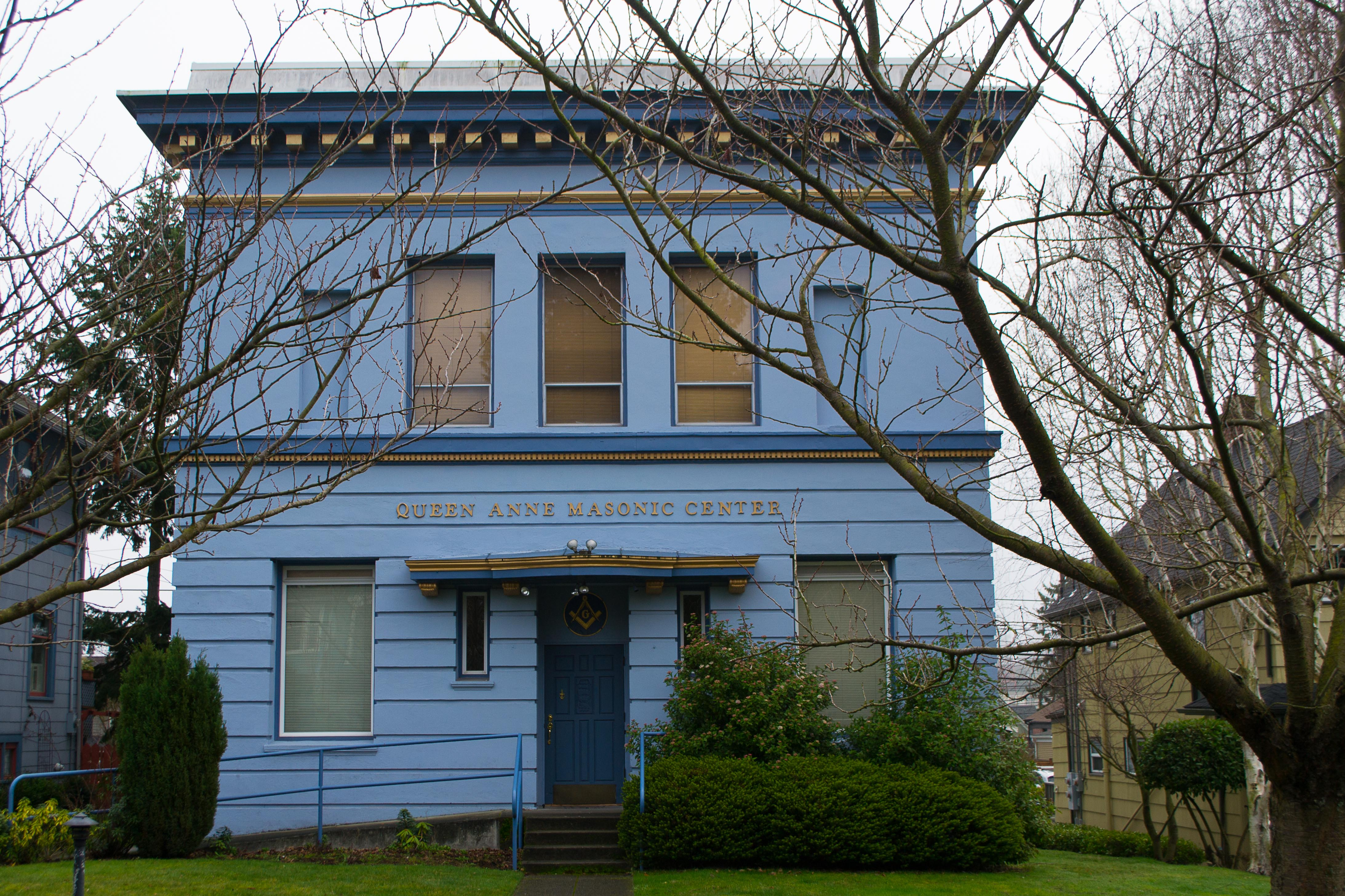

General information
- Location: 1608 4th Avenue West; Seattle, Washington
- Country: United States
- Coordinates: 47.6341°N 122.3622°W

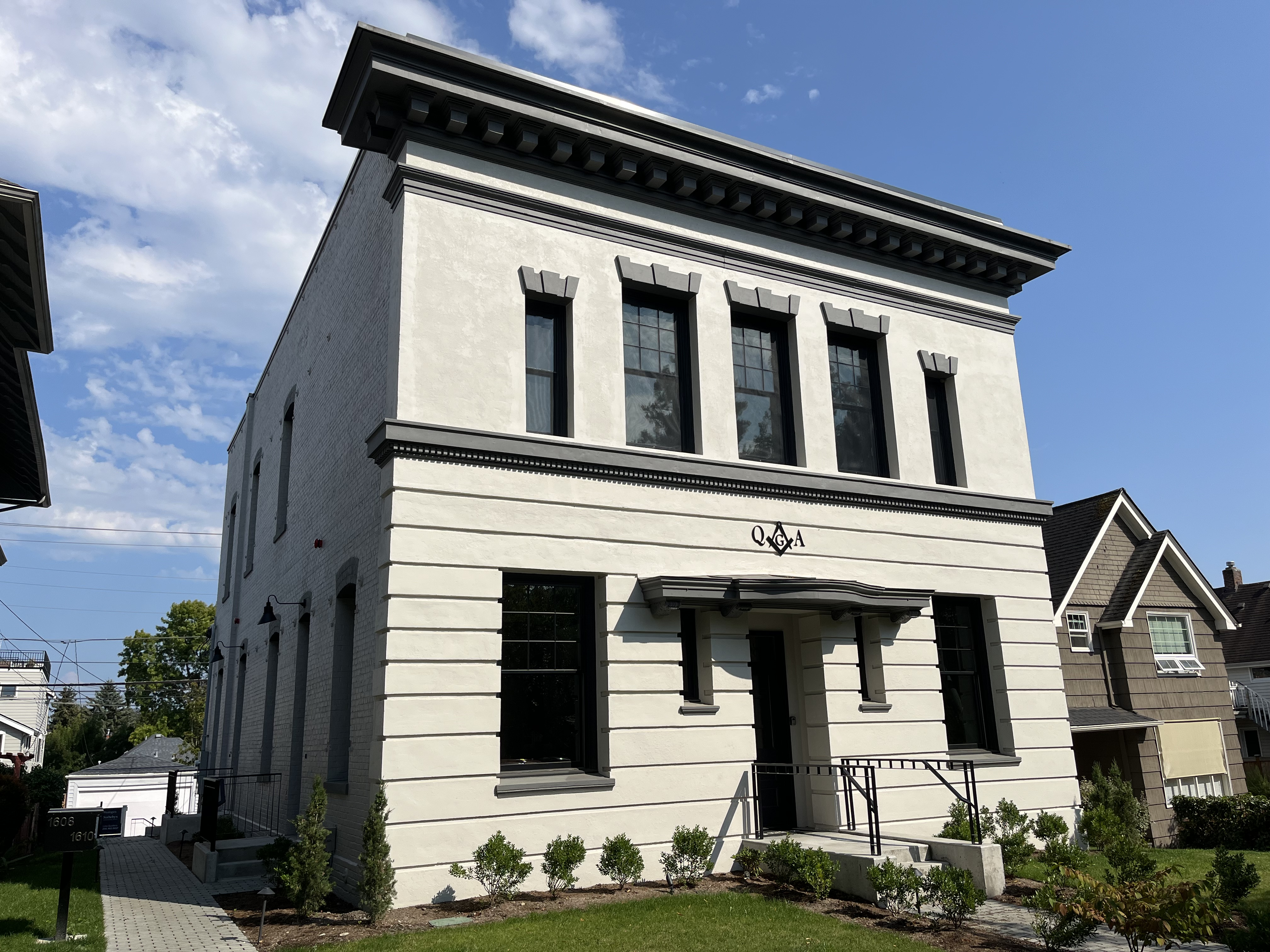
Queen Anne Masonic Lodge in 2024, after residential conversion

Queen Anne Masonic Lodge is one of the oldest buildings on top of Queen Anne Hill in Seattle, Washington. The building was originally constructed to be the Garfield telephone exchange in the early 1900s, and is directly across the street from the Queen Anne Library. The building was bought in 1924 by Queen Anne Lodge #242 of the Grand Lodge of Washington, at which time the building received its present name, in honor of the branch of the fraternity it housed.

From 1924 to 2018, it was used by Queen Anne Lodge, and was open to the public as an event space. As of 2024, the building is a renovated historic landmark with residential units.
