= Missouri T. B. Hanna =

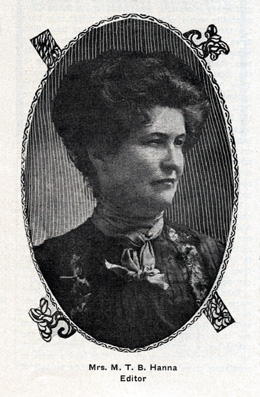
- Portrait of Missouri T.B. Hanna, 1910, from her magazine Votes for Women
- Born: Missouri Saunders; February 17, 1857; Galveston, Texas, U.S.
- Died: June 14, 1926; Edmonds, Washington, U.S.
- Occupations: publisher, property developer, journalist, suffragist, women's rights activist

Missouri T. B. Hanna (1857–1926), born Missouri Saunders, was an American suffragist, journalist, publisher and property developer from the state of Washington. She resided in Edmonds for most of her adult life.

== Personal life ==
Missouri Saunders was born February 17, 1857, in Galveston, Texas. Her father was a well-known judge, Levi Saunders. He moved the Saunders family to Arkansas when she was young. She studied at Clarke's Academy in Berryville, Arkansas before marrying J.C. Hanna, an aspiring merchant. In 1882, the Hannas moved with their three young children to Spokane Falls in the Washington Territory to pursue a mercantile business. Hanna was soon widowed, her husband died in a boating accident in Idaho. Shortly after, her 19-year-old son Kirke died from an accidental morphine overdose and her youngest daughter was handicapped from a bicycle accident. In 1904, a widow and single mother, Hanna moved with her two daughters, Florence and Mercie, to Edmonds, Washington. seeking the therapeutic benefits of the salty air.

== Career ==
Hanna had a very active career in journalism, unusual for women during this time, and championed women's right to vote. She was named Washington's "mother of journalism" by one member of the Snohomish County Press Association for her trailblazing career, particularly with the Edmonds Review-Tribune.

=== Edmonds Review ===
She became, in 1904, the first woman newspaper publisher in Washington, when she purchased the Edmonds Review and served as editor and publisher. The newspaper chronicled the early growth and development of Edmonds, then one of the main cities in the northern Puget Sound region. She ran the Review for over five years before selling in 1910 to a rival Edmonds paper, the Tribune, which was launched in 1907 by Will Taylor. The paper then merged into theTribune-Review and served the Edmonds community until the early 1980s.

As the first woman news media publisher in Washington, Hanna faced obstacles on the basis of her gender. She was not listed in the Edmonds Chamber of Commerce membership roster, for instance, and was mocked by her competitors. She was a founding member of the Snohomish County Press Association.

=== Votes for Women and The New Citizen ===
White women could vote in Washington Territory through a decree in 1867. This right was taken away through subsequent court decisions. Hanna had begun publishing the Votes for Women journal in 1909 championing the suffrage movement. She increased her activity after selling the Review. Votes for Women advocated for women to vote in Washington State and was the official organ of the Equal Suffrage Association, headed by Emma Smith DeVoe. The journal was instrumental in gaining white male support which, on November 10, 1910, led to an amendment of the state's constitution to extend the right to vote to Washington women.

Hanna began publishing a successor journal, The New Citizen, in late 1910. This publication recognized the role of the newly enfranchised women and relayed notes from the state and local meetings of the suffragist association in Washington as well as news of regional, national, and international activities. The journal's policy was to bring "the attention of the public to the general question of woman's political enfranchisement and to the special consideration of the amendment granting suffrage to women which is to be voted on in this state in November, 1910." The last issue, in January 1911, after woman suffrage became part of the State Constitution, admonished women to "use the ballot that has been given to you." At this point, the publication converted to The New Citizen, recognizing the new role of newly enfranchised women and published with her daughter, Florence Hanna Hamilton; Abigail Scott Duniway served as Oregon editor.

Hanna stopped publishing The New Citizen in 1912, due to high publishing costs.

=== Honors ===
Upon her death in 1926 she was heralded as the "Mother of Journalism" in Washington State by The Seattle Times and local Edmonds and Snohomish county newspapers. In 2017, My Edmonds News publisher Teresa Wippel honored Hanna in a heritage competition run by the Edmonds Historical Museum because she was "blown away" by her accomplishments and invisibility in the history of the city of Edmonds.

=== Property development ===
Hanna was a major land developer in Edmonds and developed the Hanna Park neighborhood, which still bears her name.
