= Vern Fonk =

American businessman

Vernon L. Fonk
- Born: June 5, 1930; Plentywood, Montana, U.S.
- Died: May 22, 2006 (aged 75); Edmonds, Washington, U.S.
- Known for: Founding Vern Fonk Insurance
- Spouse: Jerroldine Fonk
- Children: 3

Vernon L. Fonk (June 5, 1930 – May 22, 2006) was a Seattle entrepreneur best known for founding Vern Fonk Insurance, a high-risk auto insurance agency with seventeen offices, servicing Washington, Oregon and Idaho.

== Career ==
Vern Fonk Insurance is well known in the Pacific Northwest region for its humorous and off-color television commercials, which generally appear on local late-night television and have run since 1994.

After Fonk's retirement in 1995, Vern Fonk Insurance was owned by his son-in-law and daughter, Kevin and Rene Mulvaney, until they sold the business in 2010 to New York-based Confie Seguros as part of that company's plans to become the first nationwide insurance distribution company primarily dedicated to Hispanic consumers.

== Death ==
Vernon died at Stevens Hospital in Edmonds, Washington, of a bacterial blood infection in 2006.

== Legacy ==
Vern Fonk Insurance television commercials, which typically parody movies and TV shows as well as other Northwest personalities, were usually written by and starred Rob Thielke, manager of the Fonk agency office in Everett. Due to Thielke's prominence in the ads, he was commonly believed to be Fonk himself. The company's slogan, “Remember to honk when you drive by Vern Fonk,” ends each commercial. KCPQ, a FOX television affiliate in Seattle, put together a collection of Vern Fonk bumpers for JOEtv.

Thielke died August 16, 2015, after a long battle with cancer.
