= Perrinville, Edmonds, Washington =

Human settlement in Washington, United States of America

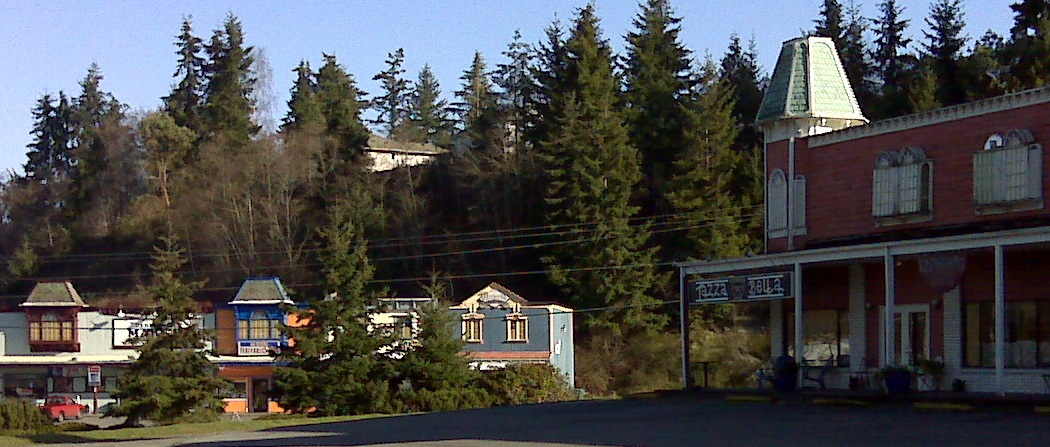
Downtown Perrinville

Perrinville is a neighborhood in Edmonds, Washington, United States. Its ZIP Code is 98026.

== History ==
During the mid 1900s the area was logged and used as farm land and residential home sites.

Perrinville was founded by Jennie Gertrude "Gertie" Perrin in 1938, who paid 10 cents to register the place name at the courthouse in Everett. A gas station/garage and grocery store were soon constructed thereafter.

The downtown area developed a turn-of-the-century theme and an eclectic mix of shops, including an antique store that Perrin owned.

In 1999, a joint effort began between the cities of Edmonds and Lynnwood to create a skate park near the north entrance of Lynndale Park along Olympic View Drive in response to a need expressed by local skaters and community leaders. The completed park now includes a 5,000-square-foot (460 m^{2}) concrete skating surface.

Where stores reside now the most forested hill behind them was a favorite motorcycle hill climb in the early 1970's.

== Geography ==
Perrinville is located at 47°49′53.5″N 122°20′15.8″W (47.831529, -122.337722). Its downtown section is located at the intersection of 76th Ave West (formerly Valley Road) and Olympic View Drive (formerly Snake Trail). The southeast section falls within the city limits of Lynnwood, WA and the remainder in Edmonds, WA.

== Clown ==
A piece of garage art known as "the clown" was a fixture on an abandoned garage. The clown has since been removed by its original owner and replaced with a white door. The Clown was painted by local Perrinville artist Jim Noonan. https://myedmondsnews.com/2014/09/looking-back-gertie-perrins-perrinville/
