= Esperance, Washington =

- CDP
- Location of Esperance, Washington
- Coordinates: 47°47′42″N 122°20′51″W
- Country: United States
- State: Washington
- County: Snohomish

Area
  - Total: 0.73 sq mi (1.9 km^{2})
  - Land: 0.73 sq mi (1.9 km^{2})
  - Water: 0 sq mi (0.0 km^{2})
- Elevation: 364 ft (111 m)

Population (2020)
  - Total: 4,007
  - Density: 5,500/sq mi (2,100/km^{2})
- Time zone: UTC-8 (Pacific (PST))
  - Summer (DST): UTC-7 (PDT)
- ZIP code: 98026
- Area code: 425
- FIPS code: 53-22255
- GNIS feature ID: 1867608

Esperance is a census-designated place (CDP) in Snohomish County, Washington, United States. Esperance is an enclave of the city of Edmonds, Washington. The population was 4,007 at the 2020 census, up from 3,601 at the 2010 census.

== Geography ==
Esperance is located at 47°47′42″N 122°20′51″W (47.795006, -122.347487).

According to the United States Census Bureau, the CDP has a total area of 0.7 square miles (1.9 km^{2}), all of it land.

== Demographics ==
Historical population
Census	Pop.	Note	%±
1980	11,120		—
1990	11,236		1.0%
2000	3,503		−68.8%
2020	4,007		—
U.S. Decennial Census; 1970 1980 1990; 2000 2010

Esperance first appeared as a census designated place in the 1980 U.S. census.

=== 2000 census ===
As of the census of 2000, there were 3,503 people, 1,315 households, and 956 families residing in the CDP. The population density was 4,852.4 people per square mile (1,878.5/km^{2}). There were 1,349 housing units at an average density of 1,868.6/sq mi (723.4/km^{2}). The racial makeup of the CDP was 87.13% White, 1.51% African American, 0.88% Native American, 7.11% Asian, 0.06% Pacific Islander, 0.51% from other races, and 2.80% from two or more races. Hispanic or Latino of any race were 2.31% of the population.

There were 1,315 households, out of which 33.3% had children under the age of 18 living with them, 60.3% were married couples living together, 9.5% had a female householder with no husband present, and 27.3% were non-families. 21.4% of all households were made up of individuals, and 6.8% had someone living alone who was 65 years of age or older. The average household size was 2.63 and the average family size was 3.04.

In the CDP, the age distribution of the population shows 25.2% under the age of 18, 5.8% from 18 to 24, 29.2% from 25 to 44, 27.7% from 45 to 64, and 12.1% who were 65 years of age or older. The median age was 39 years. For every 100 females, there were 92.6 males. For every 100 females age 18 and over, there were 90.9 males.

The median income for a household in the CDP was $58,622, and the median income for a family was $63,250. Males had a median income of $44,261 versus $32,357 for females. The per capita income for the CDP was $23,967. About 5.3% of families and 6.9% of the population were below the poverty line, including 8.8% of those under age 18 and 2.3% of those age 65 or over.

== History ==
=== Annexation ===
Five times, most recently in 2005, Esperance residents have voted on whether to be annexed by Edmonds. In each case, voters in the enclave have rejected the annexation.

Issues for annexation include a desire for a contiguous City of Edmonds, continuity of services and a belief that services will be easier to provide. Arguments against annexation include desire to remain part of unincorporated area of Snohomish county, an expectation that taxes may rise with annexation, and the desire to take part in activities that are possible in the county that would not be permitted under city regulations. The latter includes less regulation for building certain structures and the ability to keep animals.

On August 18th, 2026, Edmonds City Council voted to support a resolution declaring the City's intent to pursue annexation. By conducting it through an interlocal agreement with Snohomish County, the annexation would not need to be voted on by residents of Esperance.
