= Edmonds Arts Festival =

Annual arts festival in Washington

The Edmonds Arts Festival is held in Edmonds, Washington during Father's Day weekend annually in June. The Festival first opened in 1957, and is one of the oldest and largest art festivals in Washington. The Festival celebrates and promotes the artwork of various local and national artists, showing an average of about 200 artists per year.

Run by volunteers alone, the Festival has an array of sponsorship to support its mission. All proceeds from the Festival are used to support scholarships, schools, and community grants to promote the arts and expand cultural experiences.

Held at the Frances Anderson Cultural Center in Edmonds, the outside lawn area of the center is arranged with a variety of booths where works of fine art and artisan crafts are displayed for sale directly from the artists. Inside the center is the juried art gallery where 450 of the best local and national artists have had pieces juried in to the event.

The festival is consistently ranked in the top 100 art festival in the United States, and in the top three in the Pacific Northwest region. A wide variety of two- and three-dimensional art is represented including oil paintings, watercolors, pastels, drawings, mixed media, photography, sculpture, textiles, jewelry, and glass works.
