= List of Carnegie libraries in Washington (state) =

The following list of Carnegie libraries in Washington provides detailed information on United States Carnegie libraries in Washington, where 43 libraries were built from 33 grants (totaling $1,046,000) awarded by the Carnegie Corporation of New York from 1901 to 1916. Of the 43 libraries built, 32 still stand and out of those, 14 still serve their original purpose.

== Key ==
Building still operating as a library
Building standing, but now serving another purpose
Building no longer standing
Building listed on the National Register of Historic Places
Building contributes to a historic district on the National Register of Historic Places

== Carnegie libraries ==
	Library	City or town	Image	Date granted	Grant amount	Location	Notes
1	Aberdeen	Aberdeen		January 18, 1907	$15,000	121 E. Market Street, Aberdeen, WA. 98520-5292	Designed in Neoclassical Revival style by local architect George B. Reid. Built by American Contracting Company. Razed c. 1965 for current library.
2	Anacortes	Anacortes		December 14, 1908	$10,000	1305 8th Street, Anacortes, WA. 98221-1833	Designed by Cox, Piper & Carder of Bellingham, WA. Now the Anacortes Museum
3	Auburn	Auburn		May 17, 1912	$9,000	306 Auburn Avenue, Auburn, WA. 98002-5013	Designed by David J. Myers. Currently a dance studio
4	Bellingham Central	Bellingham		March 27, 1903	$36,000	Champion & Commercial Streets, Bellingham, WA. 98225	Designed by Alfred Lee, built by Booker & Campbell. Formally opened February 22, 1908. Razed for parking lot.
5	Bellingham Fairhaven	Bellingham		March 27, 1903	—	1117 12th Street, Bellingham, WA. 98225-6617	Designed by Seattle firm of Elliot & West. Opened December 20, 1904.
6	Burlington	Burlington		April 13, 1914	$5,000	901 E. Fairhaven Ave., Burlington, WA. 98233-1900	Designed by Blackwell and Baker in Mediterranean Revival style. Built by Whipple and Hedrick. Currently part of Burlington-Edison School District offices
7	Centralia	Centralia		January 6, 1911	$15,000	110 South Silver Street, Centralia, WA. 98531-4296	Designed by Watson M. Vernon of Aberdeen, WA. in Neoclassical Revival style. Expanded and renovated in 1976 by Harry B. Rich of Seattle.
8	Chehalis	Chehalis		May 8, 1908	$10,000	400 N. Market Blvd., Chehalis, WA. 98532-0419	Originally designed by Y.D. Hensill of Eugene, Oregon. Heavily remodeled after 1949 Olympia earthquake and razed in 2007 for a new library
9	Clarkston Public Library	Clarkston		January 17, 1912	$10,000	6th & Chestnut Streets, Clarkston, WA. 99403-2644	Designed in Neoclassical Revival style with Prairie style influences by Lewiston, Idaho architect J.H. Nave. Incorporated into Clarkston High School campus as counseling center.
10	Edmonds	Edmonds		January 31, 1910	$5,000	118 5th Avenue North, Edmonds, WA. 98020-3145	Designed by H.B. Ward in 2nd Renaissance Revival style. Operated as a library until 1982. Now a museum
11	Ellensburg	Ellensburg		January 8, 1908	$10,000	209 North Ruby Street, Ellensburg, WA. 98926-3338	Designed by S.C. Irwin in Neoclassical Revival style. Opened October 1909. Replaced by new library in 1965.
12	Everett	Everett		January 6, 1903	$25,000	3001 Oakes Avenue, Everett, WA. 98201	Designed by August F. Heide in Italianate style. Design inspired by Carnegie Library at Pomona, California which was in turn modeled after the Boston Public Library, McKim Building. Currently being renovated for Snohomish County Museum.
13	Goldendale	Goldendale		November 3, 1913	$8,000	131 West Burgen Street, Goldendale, WA. 98620-9544	Building designed by A.E. Doyle, with 1985 addition.
14	Hoquiam	Hoquiam		December 2, 1909	$20,000	420 7th Street, Hoquiam, WA. 98550-3616	Designed by Claude and Starck in the Prairie style. Built by Fred Knack. Opened 1911, remodeled and expanded in 1989-90.
15	North Yakima	North Yakima		December 14, 1903	$15,000	104 N. 3rd Street, Yakima, WA	Designed by Charles Bebb. Opened 1906, Replaced by current Central Library in 1950s.
16	Olympia	Olympia		March 20, 1903	$25,000	620 Franklin St. SE, Olympia, WA. 98501-1359	Designed by Joseph Wohleb of Olympia with Blackwell & Baker of Seattle in Neoclassical Revival style. Currently houses a non-denominational church.
17	Pasco	Pasco		December 13, 1909	$10,000	305 North 4th Avenue, Pasco, WA 99301-5324	Designed by Wilson and Ginnold in the Spanish Revival style. Built by R.L. Ross. Now the Franklin County Historical Museum
18	Port Angeles	Port Angeles		November 9, 1916	$12,500	207 South Lincoln Street, Port Angeles, WA 98362-3002	Designed by Harold H. Ginnold in the Neoclassical Revival style. Built by Chris Kuppler. Now Clallam County Historical Society museum
19	Port Townsend	Port Townsend		July 13, 1912	$12,500	1220 Lawrence Street, Port Townsend, WA. 98368	Designed by C. Lewis Wilson & Co. in the Renaissance Revival style with 1990 addition.
20	Prosser	Prosser		April 28, 1909	$5,000	902 7th Street, Prosser, WA. 99350-1454	Designed in the Neoclassical Revival style by C.D. Walter. Built by F.W. Berndt. Demolished in 1974.
21	Puyallup	Puyallup		February 15, 1912	$12,500	330 South Meridian, Puyallup, WA. 98371-5914	Designed by Roland E. Borhek in the Georgian style and dedicated on February 11, 1913. Razed c. 1961
22	Renton	Renton		May 21, 1913	$10,000	Bronson Way N. near Park Ave. N., Renton, WA 98057-2163	Designed by Harold H. Ginnold in the Georgian style. Officially opened March 11, 1914. Razed c. 1968 for park expansion; new library built nearby
23	Ritzville	Ritzville		December 24, 1906	$10,500	302 W. Main St., Ritzville, WA. 99169	Designed by Preusse and Zittel in the Neoclassical Revival style. Built by S.S. Schuler. Opened in 1907.
24	Seattle Main	Seattle		January 6, 1901	$430,000	1000 Fourth Avenue, Seattle, WA 98104	Designed in the Beaux Arts Classical style by P.J. Weber of Chicago. Built by Causey and Carney. Razed 1957-8 for new Library
25	Seattle Ballard	Seattle		March 27, 1903	$15,000	2026 Northwest Market Street, Seattle, WA. 98107-4080	Designed in the Neoclassical Revival style by Henderson Ryan. Library moved to new quarters in 1963. Building currently houses a bar called Kangaroo and Kiwi.
26	Seattle Columbia	Seattle		January 6, 1901	—	4721 Rainier Avenue South, Seattle, WA 98118-1696	Designed in the Georgian Revival style by Seattle architects W. Marbury Somervell and Harlan Thomas. Opened December 30, 1915 Received addition in 2004
27	Seattle Fremont	Seattle		January 6, 1901	—	1501 North 45th Street, Seattle, WA 98103-6708	Designed in Italian Farmhouse style by Daniel R. Huntington. Construction delayed by World War I, opened July 27, 1921. Minor renovations, mostly to lower level in 1987.
28	Seattle Green Lake	Seattle		January 6, 1901	—	7364 East Green Lake Dr. N., Seattle, WA 98115	Designed in French Renaissance style by W. Marbury Somervell and Joseph S. Coté. Built by Westlake Construction Company. Opened July 1910 Building renovated in 60s, 80s and 2000s.
29	Seattle Queen Anne	Seattle		January 6, 1901	—	400 West Garfield St., Seattle, WA 98119	Designed in the English Scholastic style by W. Marbury Somervell and Harlan Thomas. Opened January 1, 1914. Interior renovated in the 70s.
30	Seattle University	Seattle		January 6, 1901	—	5009 Roosevelt Way Northeast, Seattle, WA 98105-3610	Designed in Neoclassical Revival style by W. Marbury Somervell and Joseph S. Coté. Opened August 6, 1910. Renovated in 60s, 80s and 2000s.
31	Seattle West Seattle	Seattle		January 6, 1901	—	2306 42nd Ave. S.W., Seattle, WA 98116	Designed in French Renaissance Revival style by W. Marbury Somervell and Joseph S. Coté. Opened July 23, 1910 Minor renovations in 30s, 40s, 60s and 2000s.
32	Sedro-Woolley	Sedro-Woolley		July 9, 1913	$10,000	226 Bennett Street, Sedro-Woolley, WA 98284-1607	Designed in Neoclassical Revival style by Charles Saunders and opened in 1915.. Razed for Sedro-Woolley High School expansion
33	Snohomish	Snohomish		March 13, 1909	$10,000	105 Cedar Avenue, Snohomish, WA. 98290	Designed in Neoclassical Revival/Prairie Style by Bigger and Warner. Opened in 1910 and expanded in 1968. Later used by Arts of Snohomish until its closure in 2017. Completely renovated and reopened for public use in 2021.
34	South Bend	South Bend		January 20, 1908	$10,000	1216 1st Street, South Bend, WA 98586	Designed in Renaissance Revival style by James T. Walsh. Built by Willapa Construction and opened in 1913. Renovations include window replacement as well as ADA restroom and lift.
35	Spokane Main	Spokane		March 27, 1903	$155,000	10 S. Cedar Street, Spokane, WA. 99201-6823	Designed in Neoclassical Revival style by Spokane firm of Preusse & Zittel. Built by H.J. Skinner. Library moved to former Sears Department Store building in 1963. Building currently houses Integrus, an architectural firm.
36	Spokane Altamont	Spokane		March 27, 1903	—	25 South Altamont Street, Spokane, WA 99202-3952	Designed in Neoclassical Revival style by Spokane Architect Albert Held. Opened in 1914. Currently an office for Naegeli Court Reporters.
37	Spokane Heath	Spokane		March 27, 1903	—	527 East Mission Avenue, Spokane, WA 99202-1917	Designed in Gothic Revival style by Spokane architect Julius Zittel, and opened in 1914. It is located in Spokane's Mission Hill Historic District.
38	Spokane North Hill	Spokane		March 27, 1903	—	925 W. Montgomery Avenue, Spokane, WA 99205-1186	Designed in Neoclassical Revival style by Albert Held. Opened in 1914. Sold to Veterans of Foreign Wars in 1967. Currently occupied by a law firm.
39	Sunnyside	Sunnyside		April 16, 1910	$5,000	621 Grant Avenue, Sunnyside, WA 98944	Designed in Neoclassical Revival style by E.H. Ragland and opened in 1911. Razed for new library in 1964.
40	Tacoma	Tacoma		March 8, 1901	$75,000	S 12th St & Tacoma Ave S	Designed in Neoclassical Revival style by Jardine, Kent & Jardine of New York City with Norton L. Taylor & Everett Babcock supervising architects. Officially opened June 5, 1903. 1949 earthquake damaged building's dome. 1952 addition to library included significant interior modifications.
41	Vancouver	Vancouver		January 20, 1908	$10,000	1511 Main St., Vancouver, Wa. 98660-2945	Designed in Neoclassical Revival style by Dennis Nichols and William Kaufman. Built by Ole Larson. Opened New Year's Eve 1909. Library replaced in 1963. Building now serves as Clark County Historical Museum
42	Walla Walla	Walla Walla		November 18, 1903	$25,000	109 S. Palouse St., Walla Walla, WA 99362-3247	Designed in Neoclassical Revival style by Henry Osterman. Served as library until 1970. Now the Carnegie Art Center.
43	Wenatchee	Wenatchee		March 27, 1909	$10,000	Douglas Street and South Chelan Avenue, Wenatchee, WA 98801-2202	Designed in Renaissance Revival style by Blackwell and Baker. Opened in 1912. Library moved in 1939. Now housing Wenatchee city park offices.

== See also ==
- List of libraries in the United States
