= The Gothard Sisters =

American Celtic music trio

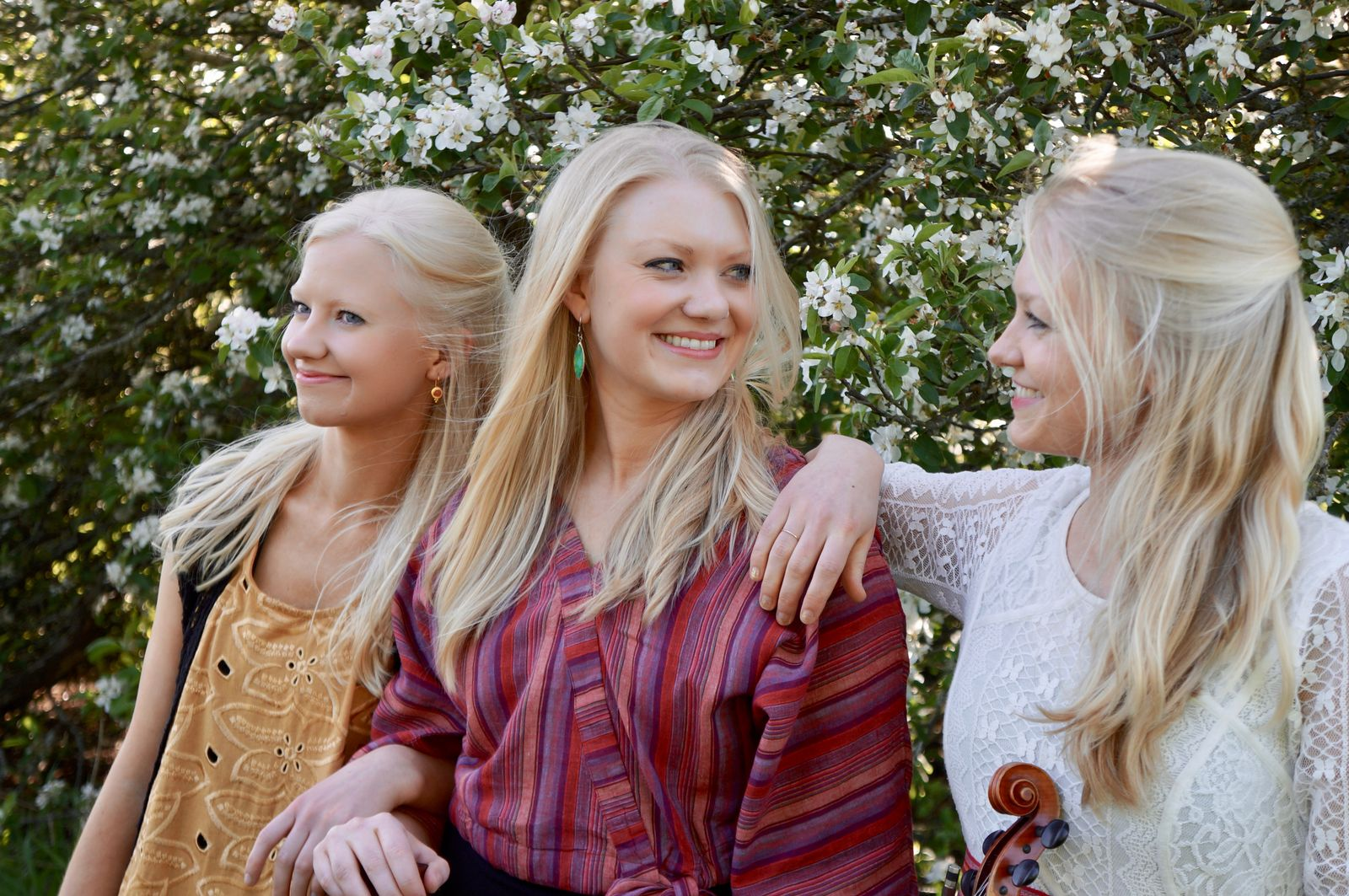
- The Gothard Sisters in 2018

Background information
- Origin: Edmonds, Washington, United States
- Genres: Celtic; pop; rock; world
- Years active: 2006–present
- Members: Greta Gothard (aged 36); Willow Gothard (aged 34); Solana Gothard (aged 28)
- Website: www.gothardsisters.com

The Gothard Sisters are three American sisters from Edmonds, Washington, who perform Celtic music and choreographed accompanying Irish dance. They play nationwide at county and state fairs, as well as festivals, and at other venues. Greta, Willow, and Solana Gothard, are violinists, singers, and championship dancers, having added guitar, bodhrán, mandolin, and the pennywhistle to their repertoire. The trio has released several albums.

== Background ==
The Gothard sisters were raised in Edmonds, Washington. Greta began to take classical violin lessons when she was five years old, followed by Willow and then by Solana, when they reached the same age. One day their mother brought home a video of the theatrical show Riverdance, which inspired the girls to enroll in Irish dance classes, and they also became fond of Celtic music. All three became accomplished Irish dancers, and they began to perform classical music and Irish dance at farmers markets, wedding ceremonies, and festivals, to raise funds for travelling to regional and world championships of Irish dance, known as Oireachtas, where they have won awards. The sisters qualified for the World Championships three years in a row.

== Career ==
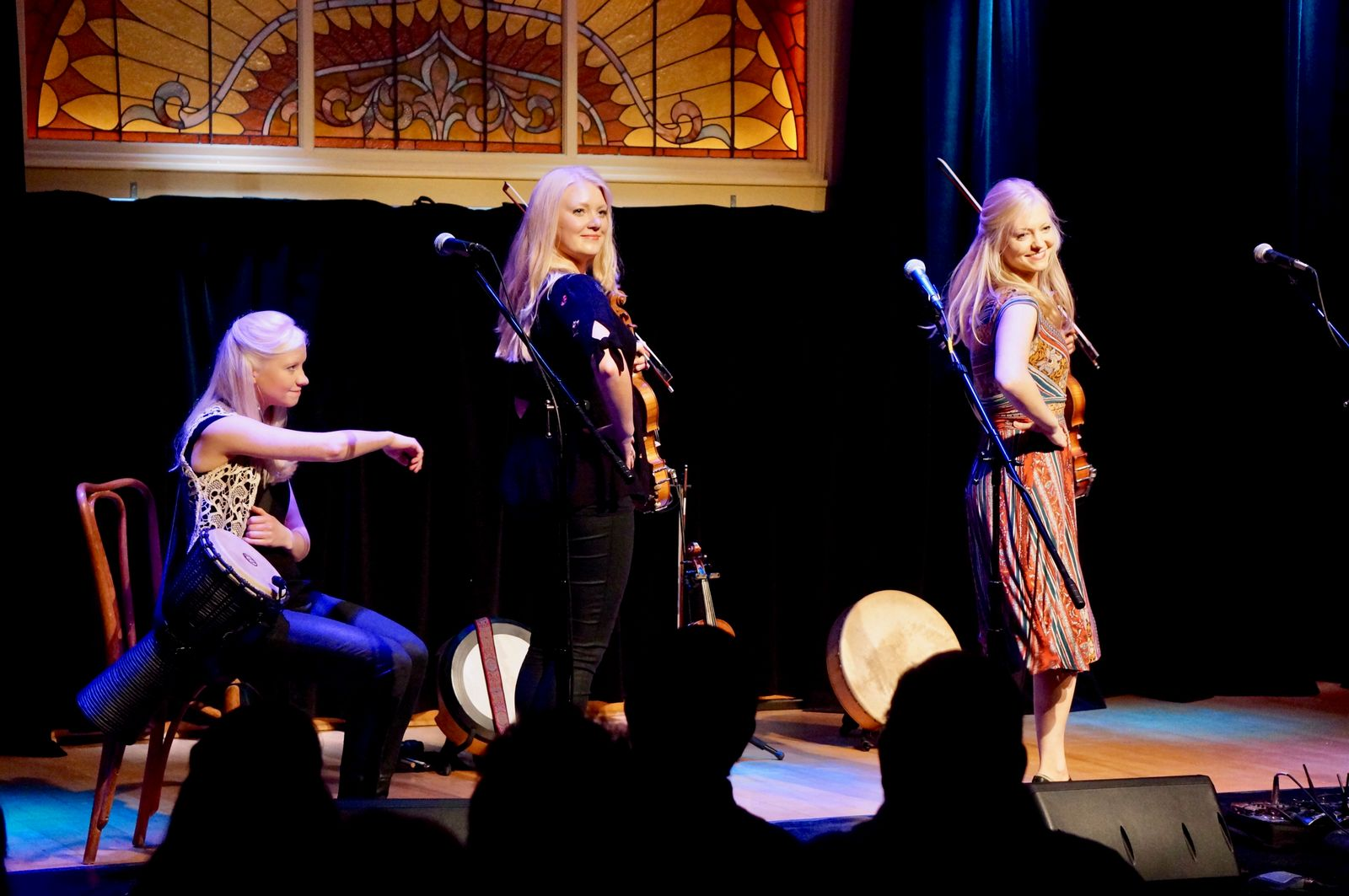
The Gothard Sisters performing during a concert in 2018

While performing in their hometown, the ensemble was discovered by a talent scout from Nashville in 2007, who became their agent. As the sisters continued to compete in Irish dance championships, they travelled throughout the United States to many fairs and Celtic festivals. They polished their performances by learning to play various other instruments, such as the guitar, electric guitar, bodhrán, mandolin, cajón and the pennywhistle, while also showing their dancing skills onstage. Additionally, they all became singers, with Solana performing as the lead vocalist. The Gothard Sisters were named the Best New Irish Artists of 2013 by the Irish Music Awards.

The group has released several albums of Celtic music, including new arrangements of traditional songs as well as original compositions. The track "Little Drummer Girl" from their Christmas album (2010) was chosen for the Putumayo World Music 2014 Celtic Christmas compilation; the song was also featured on BBC Radio Scotland's Travelling Folk show in December 2012, as well as on the national public service broadcaster of Ireland, Raidió Teilifís Éireann, in December 2014. Their album Story Girl (2011) was awarded Album of the Year by Celtic Radio. The music videos that the trio upload to YouTube are filmed and edited by Greta, whereas Willow is in charge of sewing the costumes they use for performances.

== Discography ==
| Title | Release year | Media format |
|---|---|---|
| Christmas Violins | 2006 | CD |
| ...and to All a Good Night | 2007 | CD |
| Now is the Hour | 2008 | CD |
| Daughters of Erin | 2008 | CD |
| Celtic Rainbow | 2009 | CD |
| Christmas | 2010 | CD |
| Story Girl | 2011 | CD |
| "Fairy Dance Jig" | 2012 | Single |
| Christmas Live in Seattle 2012 | 2012 | CD |
| Compass | 2013 | CD |
| Christmas Violins | 2014 | CD |
| Mountain Rose | 2015 | CD |
| "Hummingbird" | 2016 | Single |
| Falling Snow | 2016 | CD |
| Midnight Sun | 2018 | CD |
| Celtic Christmas LIVE | 2018 | EP |
| It's the Little Things | 2019 | CD |
| "Chasing the Sun" | 2020 | Single |
| Dragonfly | 2021 | CD |
| "New Horizons" | 2022 | Single |
| A Celtic Christmas | 2023 | CD |
| Moment in Time | 2025 | CD |
