= Edmonds Beacon =

Weekly newspaper in Edmonds, Washington

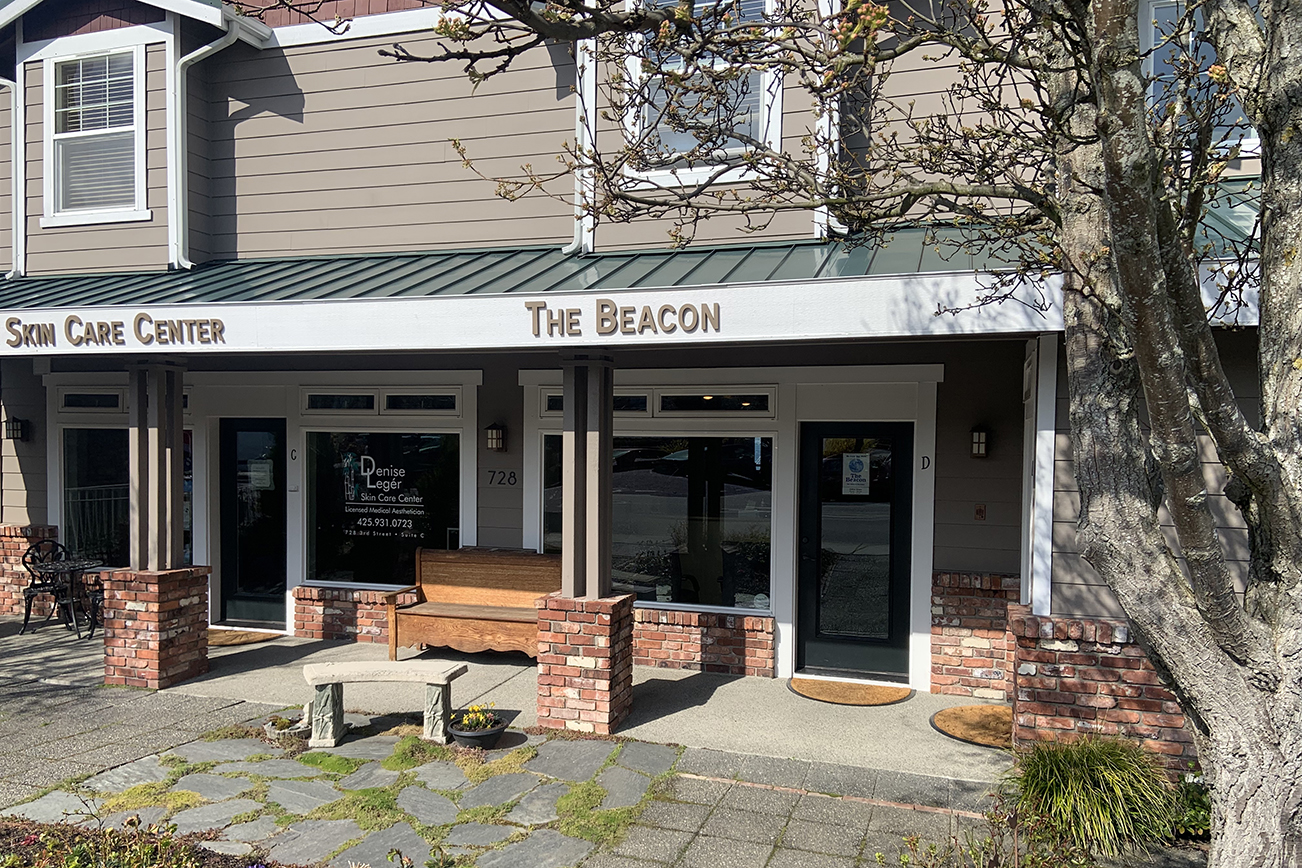
- The Beacon's office in Mukilteo, Washington on March 15, 2023.
- Type: Weekly newspaper
- Format: Broadsheet
- Owner(s): Beacon Publishing, Inc.
- Editor: Brian Soergel
- Founded: 1986
- Headquarters: 728 Third Street, Suite D Mukilteo, Washington, U.S.
- Circulation: 10,100 (as of 2022)
- ISSN: 2768-6396
- OCLC number: 48455665
- Website: edmondsbeacon.com

The Edmonds Beacon is a weekly newspaper serving the city of Edmonds in Snohomish County, Washington. It is owned by Beacon Publishing, Inc.

== History ==
The Edmonds Beacon began publication in 1986, as part of the Beacon Publishing, Inc. family of newspapers. Beacon Publishing was founded in 1992, in Mukilteo. Beacon Publishing, Inc. is owned by Paul Archipley, and also publishes the Mukilteo Beacon and the Mill Creek Beacon. Sara Bruestle was editor of the Edmonds and Mukilteo editions of the Beacon prior to becoming features editor of The Everett Herald in 2016. The current editor for Edmonds Beacon is Brian Soergel and the sports editor is David Pan. As of 2017, the newspaper's archives were only available to subscribers.

== Awards and praise ==
Edmonds mayor Dave Earling praised the Beacon, along with My Edmonds News, in 2016 and 2018, describing the two as sources he consults "to find what's going on in town well beyond what I see and hear about."

In 2018, Paul Archipley, owner of Beacon Publishing, Inc., won the Washington Newspaper Publisher's Association's Miles Turnbull Editor/Publisher Award.

In 2020, editor Brian Soergel won Washington Newspaper Publisher's Association's Better Newspaper Contest awards in several categories.

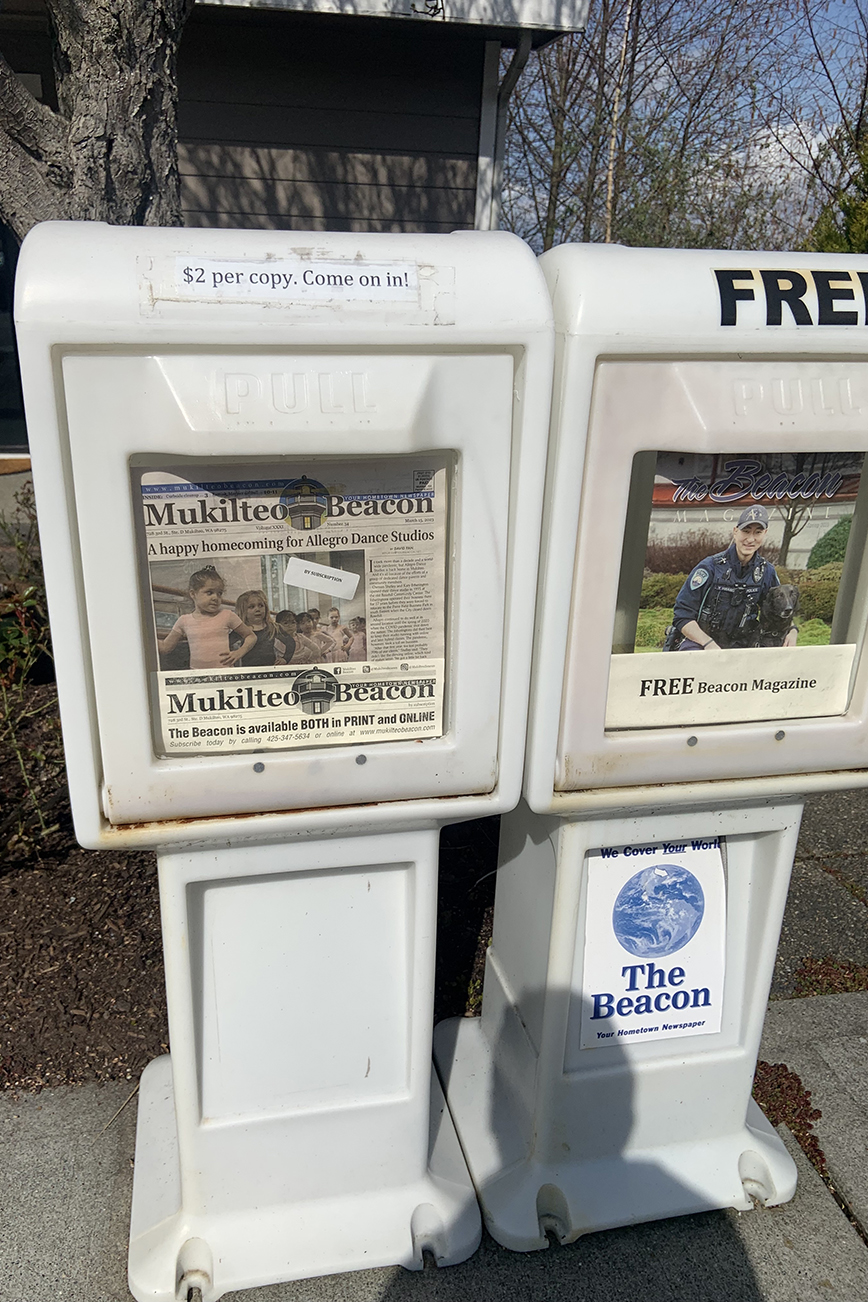
The Mukilteo Beacon's newspaper box outside The Beacon's office on March 15, 2023.
