= Andrew Carnegie Library (Edmonds, Washington) =

- U.S. National Register of Historic Places
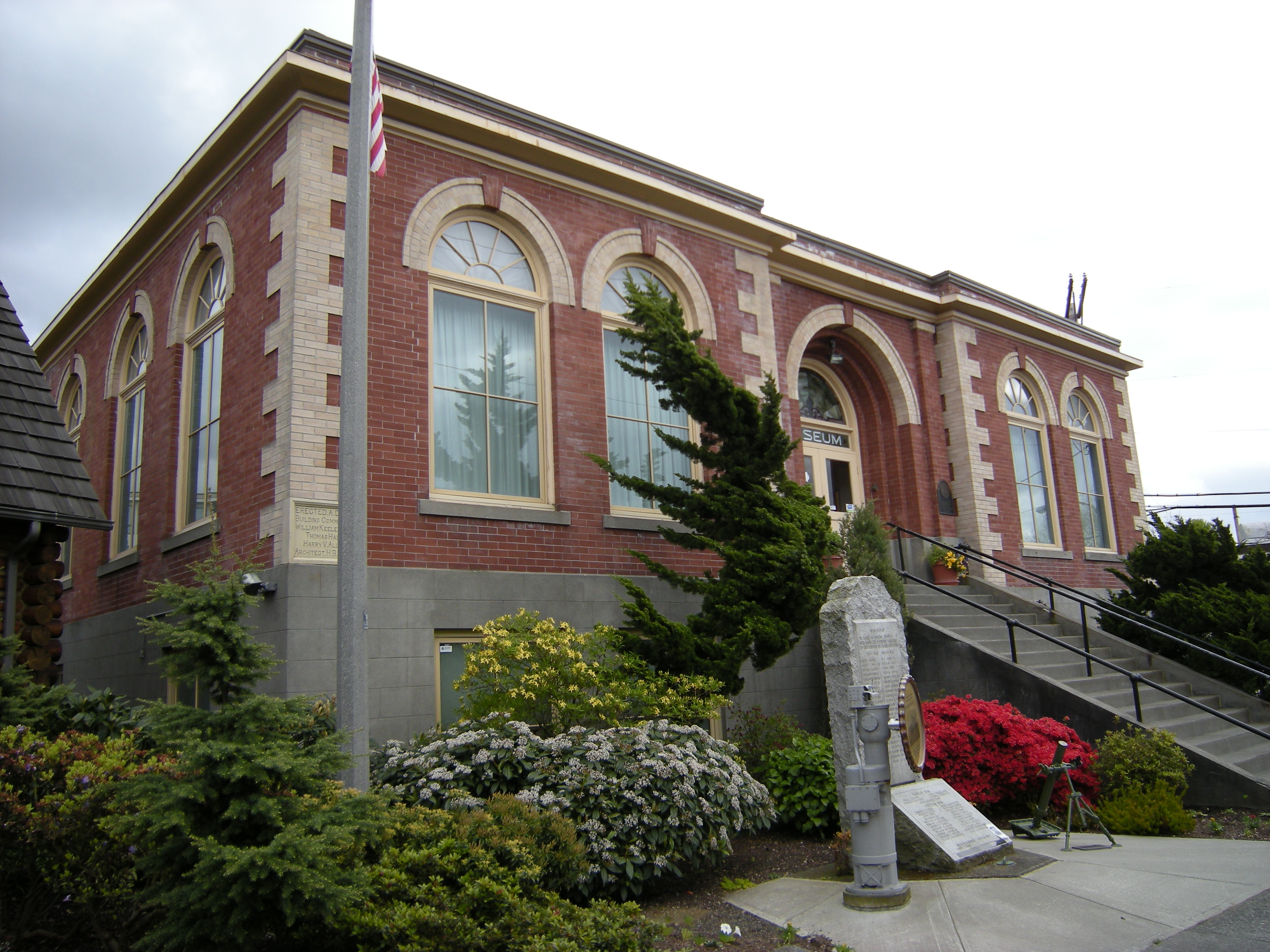
- The building's present incarnation as the Edmonds Historical Museum

- Location within Washington (state)
- Location: 118 5th Avenue N., Edmonds, Washington
- Coordinates: 47°48′40″N 122°22′32″W
- Area: Less than one acre
- Built: 1910
- Architect: Ward, H.B.
- Architectural style: Edwardian, Beaux Arts
- MPS: Carnegie Libraries of Washington TR (AD)
- NRHP reference No.: 73001887
- Added to NRHP: April 24, 1973

Andrew Carnegie Library is a library building located in Edmonds, Washington listed on the National Register of Historic Places. The building was constructed in 1910 after the city received a $5,000 grant from philanthropist Andrew Carnegie for the construction of a public library. The building numbers among its Beaux-Arts architectural features the Tiffany glass fan light over the main entrance and its terra cotta window and door surrounds and exterior corners.

The city's library was originally established in 1901 and moved into the building on February 17, 1911. The building originally had a library on the upper floor, while Edmonds City Hall occupied the bottom floor. It subsequently served as the headquarters of the city's parks and recreation department. The building became the Edmonds Historical Museum in 1973.

== See also ==
- List of Carnegie libraries in the United States
- National Register of Historic Places listings in Snohomish County, Washington
