= Edmonds, Washington =

Edmonds
- City
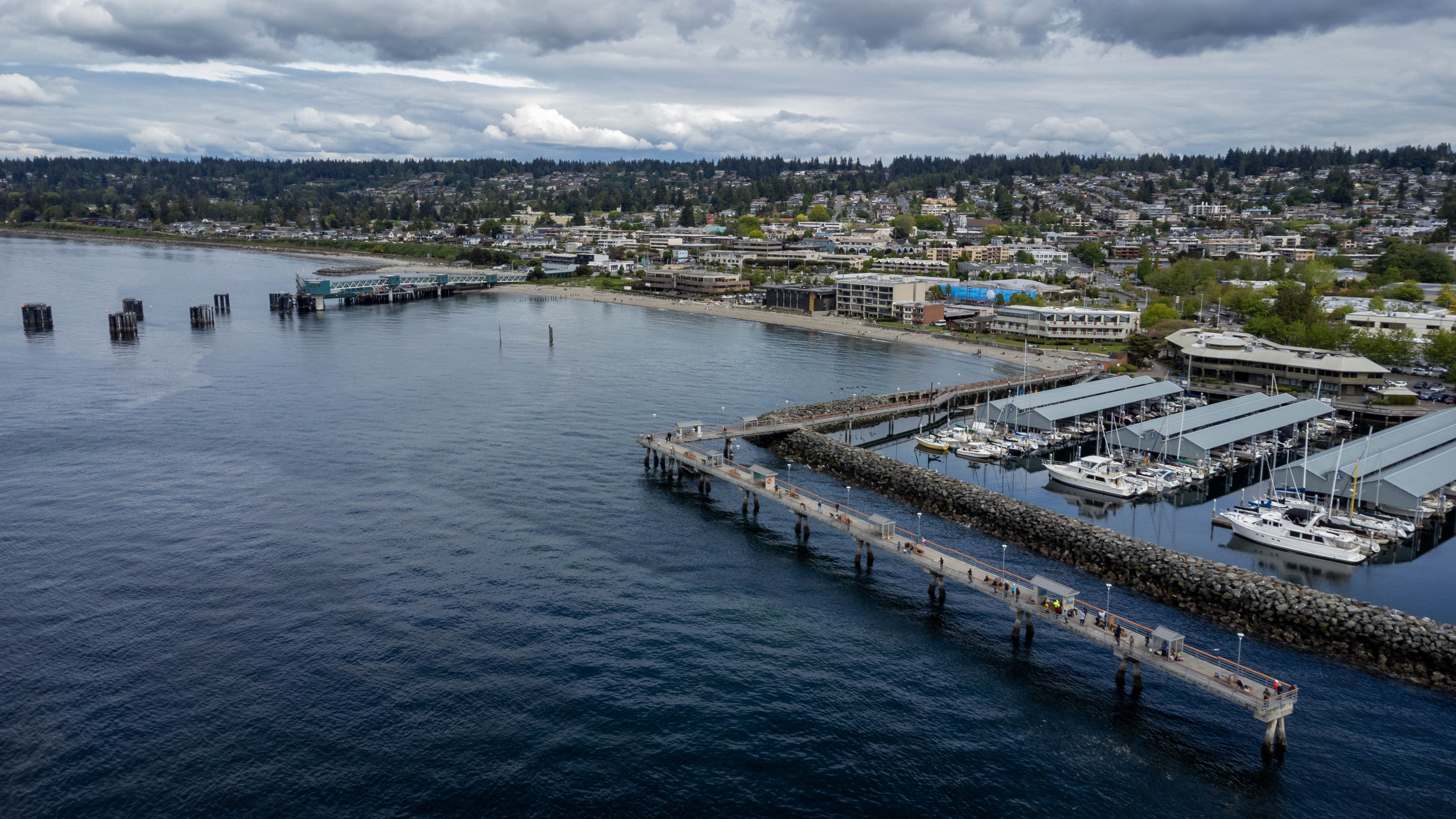
- Aerial view of downtown Edmonds near the Washington State Ferries terminal

- Seal
- Interactive map of Edmonds
- Coordinates: 47°48′25″N 122°20′48″W
- Country: United States
- State: Washington
- County: Snohomish
- Established: 1876
- Incorporated: August 14, 1890

Government
  - Type: Mayor–council
  - Mayor: Mike Rosen

Area
  - Total: 10.01 sq mi (25.92 km^{2})
  - Land: 8.92 sq mi (23.09 km^{2})
  - Water: 1.09 sq mi (2.82 km^{2}) 10.9%
- Elevation: 66 ft (20 m)

Population (2020)
  - Total: 42,853
  - Estimate (2024): 42,871
  - Density: 4,778/sq mi (1,844.9/km^{2})
- Time zone: UTC-8 (Pacific (PST))
  - Summer (DST): UTC-7 (PDT)
- ZIP codes: 98020, 98026
- Area code: 425
- FIPS code: 53-20750
- GNIS feature ID: 1512180
- Website: edmondswa.gov

Edmonds is a city in Snohomish County, Washington, United States. It is located in the southwest corner of the county, facing Puget Sound and the Olympic Mountains to the west. The city is part of the Seattle metropolitan area and is located 15 miles (24 km) north of Seattle and 18 miles (29 km) southwest of Everett. With a population of 42,853 residents in the 2020 U.S. census, Edmonds is the third most populous city in the county.

Edmonds was established in 1876 by logger George Brackett, who bought the land claim of an earlier settler. It was incorporated as a city in 1890, shortly before the arrival of the Great Northern Railway. Early residents of the city were employed by the shingle mills and logging companies that operated in the area until the 1950s. The hills surrounding Edmonds were developed into suburban bedroom communities in the mid-to-late 20th century and subsequently annexed into the city. Edmonds is a regional hub for the arts, with museums, specialized facilities, and major annual festivals within the city's downtown area.

The city is connected to nearby areas by two state highways and the state ferry system, which operates a ferry route to Kingston on the Kitsap Peninsula. Public transit service in Edmonds is centered around the downtown train station, served by Amtrak and Sounder commuter trains, and includes several Community Transit bus routes that travel through outlying neighborhoods.

== History ==
=== 19th and early 20th centuries ===
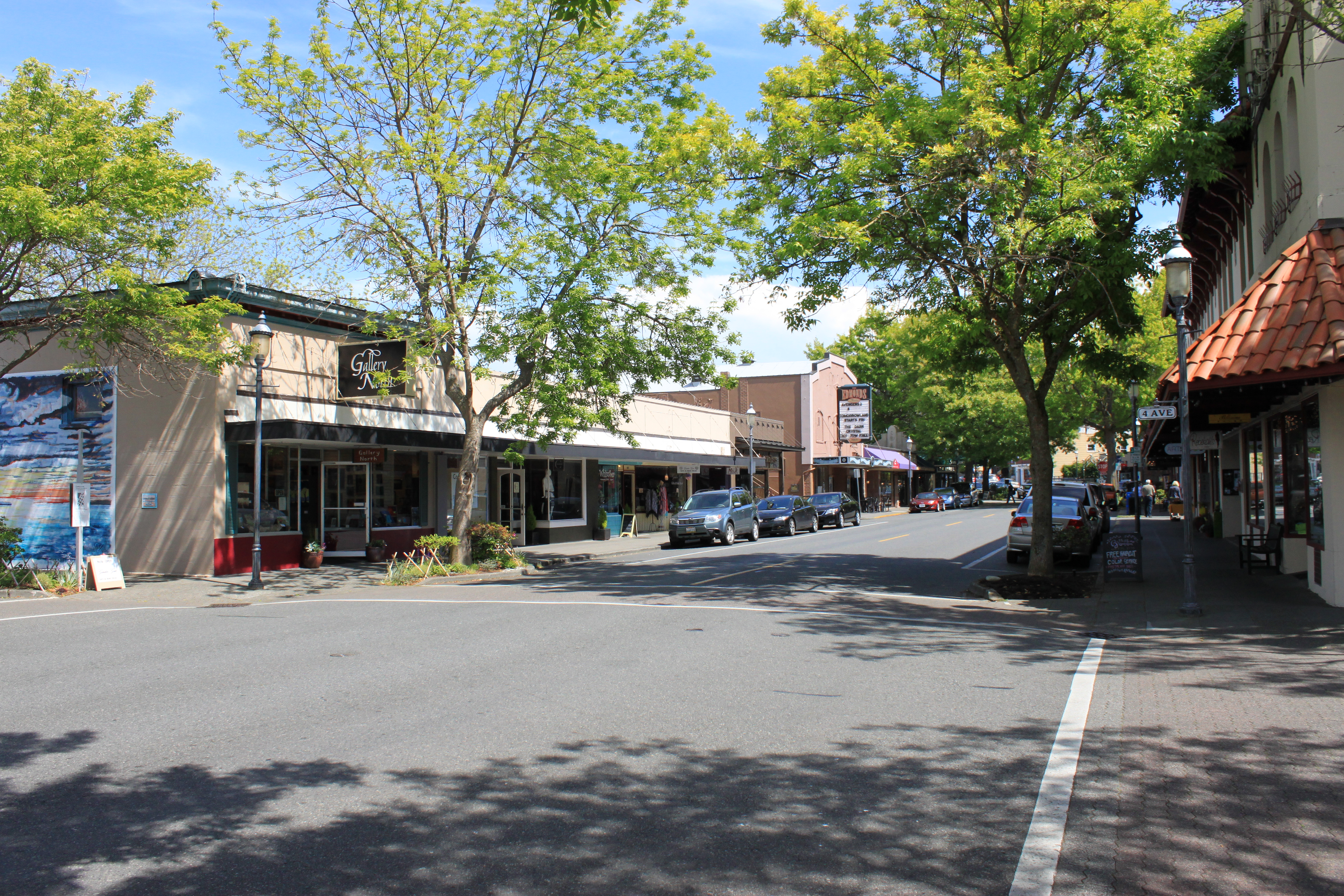
Main Street in downtown Edmonds

Prior to the 19th century, the Edmonds area was inhabited by the Suquamish tribe, who foraged and fished near the flat beach forming modern-day downtown. No archaeological evidence of a permanent settlement in Edmonds has been found, despite claims that a fishing village had existed near the modern-day downtown.

An exploratory expedition of Puget Sound led by Charles Wilkes charted the Edmonds area in 1841, naming "Point Edmund" (now Point Edwards) to the southwest of the modern-day downtown. A 147-acre (59 ha) land claim for the area was filed by Pleasant Ewell in 1866 and was sold to various landowners before being eventually purchased by Canadian-born logger George Brackett in 1872 for $650. Brackett had allegedly found the future site of Edmonds in 1870 while searching for potential logging areas on his canoe, which was blown ashore during a storm. Brackett and his family moved from Ballard to Point Edmund in 1876, intent on creating a town. He drained a marshland near the waterfront and began logging the area, then known as "Brackett's Landing". Additional settlers arrived over the next few years, necessitating the construction of a wharf and general store by 1881. In 1884, the settlement was platted and gained its first post office, christened with the name "Edmonds", either a misspelling of Point Edmund or the name of George Franklin Edmunds, a U.S. Senator from Vermont who Brackett admired.

By the end of the decade, Edmonds had gained its first schoolhouse, sawmill, hotel, and drug store. The Town of Edmonds was formally incorporated as a fourth-class village of 600 acres (240 ha) on August 14, 1890, following an election by residents on August 7. To meet the minimum population of 300 residents required for incorporation, a popular legend states that Brackett added the names of his two oxen to the census conducted prior to the election. Edmonds is the oldest incorporated city in Snohomish County. Brackett was elected as the town's mayor for several months, and the new town council passed ordinances to regulate or ban saloons, gambling establishments, and boarding houses. The same year, Edmonds was selected as a stop on the Seattle and Montana Railroad (later absorbed into the Great Northern Railway), sparking interest from real estate investors. The Minneapolis Realty and Investment Company bought 455 acres (1.84 km^{2}) of the townsite from Brackett for $36,000, and built a new hotel and wharf. The railway arrived in 1891, but failed to spark a land rush and the investment plan fell apart during the Panic of 1893, leaving Brackett to foreclose on the land.

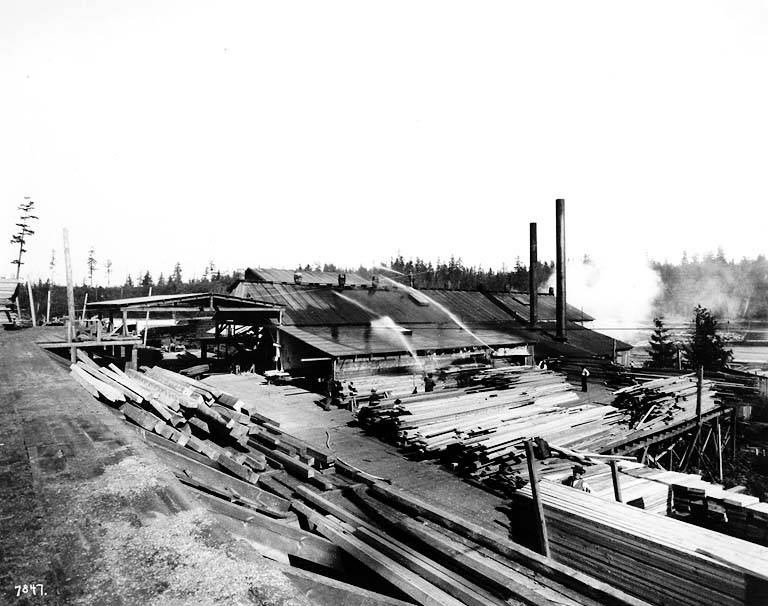
A shingle mill on Lake Ballinger, pictured in 1907

Edmonds was supported by four shingle mills that prospered in the 1890s, along with an iron foundry that manufactured steel plates for shingles. By 1908, the town had gained its own water system, electricity, paved streets, and telephone service. In September 1908, Edmonds voted to become a third-class city, with a reported population of 1,546 residents. The city unsuccessfully lobbied for a branch of the interurban line from Everett to Seattle, which would have supplemented passenger steamships on the Mosquito fleet and passenger trains operated by Great Northern. A major fire on July 8, 1909, destroyed one block of buildings on Main Street and caused $20,000 in damage. After the fire, the destroyed buildings were bought by a member of the city council, and replaced by a two-story concrete building.

The first automobile owned by an Edmonds resident arrived in 1911 and was followed by the completion of the North Trunk Road through modern-day Lynnwood. A branch road to Edmonds was completed in 1915 and stagecoach lines were extended to the city. Automobile ferry service began in 1923, with the inauguration of the Kingston ferry, which would be acquired by the Puget Sound Navigation Company and continue to serve the city after the decline of the Mosquito fleet. During the 1920s, Edmonds expanded its wharf and ferry dock, while a site on the south end of the waterfront was acquired by the Union Oil Company (later Unocal) for the construction of an oil terminal in 1922. A second major fire struck downtown Edmonds on April 11, 1928, damaging several buildings on the same block of Main Street as the 1909 fire. Despite the increasing scarcity of local timber, the sawmills on the Edmonds waterfront remained the city's main industry in the 1920s. During the Great Depression, all but two mills continued to operate and were supplemented by local improvement projects organized by the federal Works Progress Administration, including regraded streets, new parks, and the addition of an auditorium and sportsfields to the high school.

=== Late 20th and early 21st centuries ===
The popularity of new materials for roof shingles and scarcity of available timber in the state forced most of Edmonds' mills to close by 1951. New companies were established in place of the mills, including an aluminum fabricator and an asphalt refinery at the Unocal terminal. The now vacated waterfront was redeveloped under the direction of the Port of Edmonds, established in 1948 by a public referendum. During the 1950s and 1960s, the Port constructed a breakwater, marina, public beach, and a new ferry terminal for the Washington State Ferries system. The hills surrounding downtown Edmonds to the north and east were developed into suburban subdivisions, centered around small commercial centers, and were annexed by the city. Edmonds reached its present eastern boundary along State Route 99 in May 1959, a few weeks after the incorporation of Lynnwood as a city. By 1963, the city had completed its largest annexations and petitioned to become a first-class city, with a population of 19,000 that placed it second among cities in Snohomish County. Despite population growth, Edmonds restricted the construction of multi-family dwellings in an effort to keep the downtown area and older neighborhoods "rural-like" and low density. By the end of the 1960s, Edmonds had also gained a new hospital, a community college, and civic center campus.

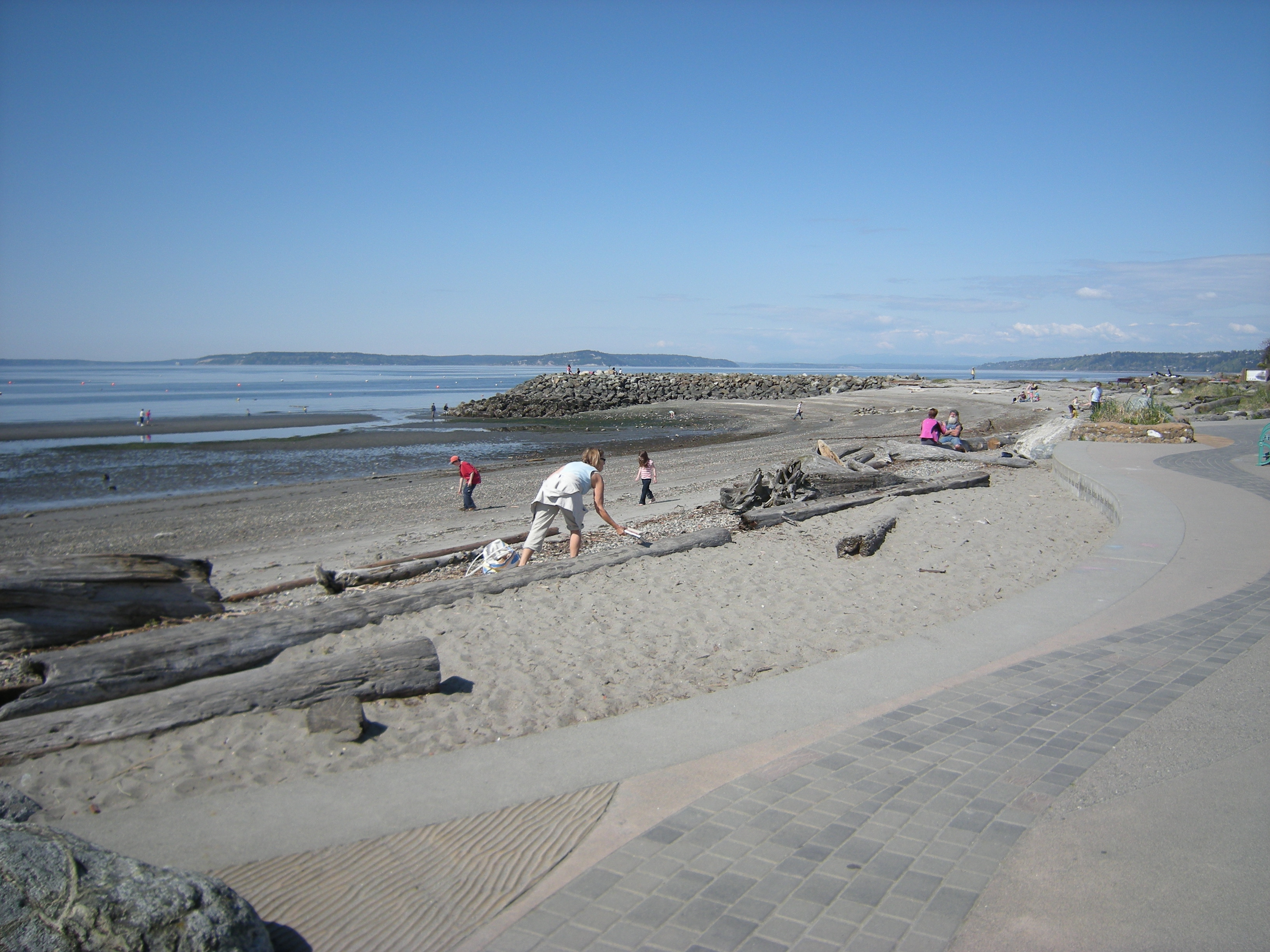
Brackett's Landing Park, a public beach developed in the 1970s

In the 1970s, the number of businesses in downtown Edmonds declined as suburban shopping centers lured away customers. After a number of buildings in the downtown area were demolished and replaced with condominiums and office buildings, a movement to preserve and restore historic buildings emerged with the support of the city government. The "Main Street Project", funded by local businesses, restored empty storefronts and attracted restaurants to the city in the late 1980s, fueling a downtown revival. Portions of the waterfront were acquired by the city and redeveloped into a public beach, named Brackett's Landing Park, and a public fishing pier was opened in 1979 as the first saltwater fishing pier in the state. Edmonds celebrated its centennial in 1990 with a series of events and the dedication of the Centennial Plaza. Several neighborhoods in southern Edmonds were annexed between 1995 and 1997, forming the city's southern boundary at the King County line.

The Point Edwards oil terminal on the city's waterfront was closed by Unocal in 1991 and the 53-acre (21 ha) site was sought by Edmonds and Snohomish County for redevelopment. The city favored the construction of a new multimodal transportation hub at the site, including a ferry terminal and commuter rail station, while the county proposed the construction of a sewage treatment plant to be used by King and Snohomish counties. The sewage treatment plant was opposed by the city government and citizen groups, and was ultimately moved to an alternative site near Woodinville in 2003. The transportation plan was put on hold after costs increased and the state ferry system diverted funding to other projects. The hilltop portion of the site was cleaned up in the 2000s and redeveloped into condominiums that opened between 2007 and 2008.

== Geography ==
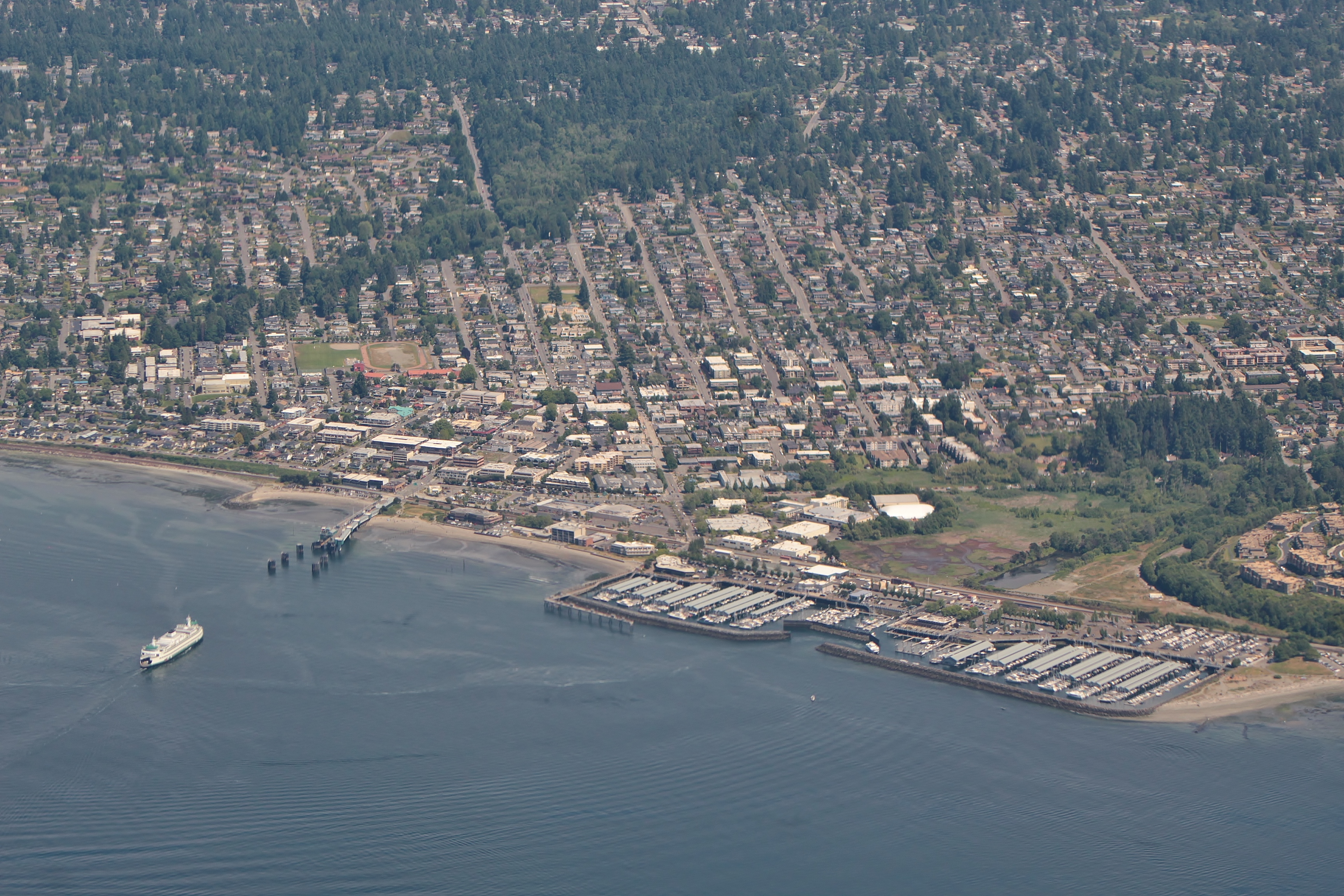
Aerial view of downtown Edmonds

Edmonds is located in the southwest corner of Snohomish County in Western Washington, and is considered a suburb of Seattle, located 15 miles (24 km) to the south. The city is bordered to the west by Puget Sound and the city of Woodway, which lies south of Pine Street and west of 5th Avenue South. To the south of the county boundary at 244th Street Southwest is Shoreline in King County. The city's southeastern border with Mountlake Terrace is defined by the Interurban Trail, while the eastern and northern borders with Lynnwood run along 76th Avenue West, Olympic View Drive, and Lund's Gulch. The unincorporated area of Esperance, located in the southeast corner of the city, is an enclave of Edmonds and has resisted several attempts at annexation. According to the United States Census Bureau, the city has a total area of 18.42 square miles (47.71 km^{2}), of which 8.90 square miles (23.05 km^{2}) is land and 9.52 square miles (24.66 km^{2}) is water.

Edmonds has 5 miles (8.0 km) of shoreline, which is crossed by several small streams. The Puget Sound makes up 86 percent of the city's drainage basin, with other streams flowing into Lake Ballinger to the southeast. The city's main commercial districts are Downtown Edmonds, situated in a valley known as the "bowl", and the State Route 99 corridor at its east end. The downtown area and "bowl" have views of Puget Sound and the Olympic Mountains. The city has several outlying suburban neighborhoods with their own commercial centers, including Firdale, Five Corners, Perrinville, Seaview, Sherwood, and Westgate.

== Economy ==
As of 2015, Edmonds has an estimated workforce population of 22,152 and an unemployment rate of 3.8 percent. As of 2019, most of the city's employed residents commute to neighboring cities for work, including 11 percent to Seattle, 6 percent to Lynnwood, 6 percent to Everett, and 5 percent to Shoreline. Only 11.7 percent of residents work at employers within Edmonds city limits. The average one-way commute for Edmonds residents was approximately 31 minutes; 71 percent of commuters drove alone to their workplace, while 9 percent carpooled and 9 percent used public transit. The most common occupational industry for Edmonds residents is in educational and health services, employing 23 percent, followed by retail (13%) and professional services (12%). The nearest shopping malls are Alderwood in Lynnwood and Aurora Village in Shoreline, the latter of which was seen as a potential annexation target by Edmonds in the 1990s.

The city has over 13,000 jobs, a ratio of 0.325 jobs per capita—a figure that is lower than neighboring cities. Approximately 70 percent of jobs in Edmonds are in the services sector, which includes health care and professional services. Other large industries in Edmonds include retail (12%), education (6%), and construction (4%). The city's largest employers are the Edmonds School District, Swedish Medical Center, and large retailers, which includes grocery stores and car dealerships. The car dealerships, which are primarily located along the State Route 99 corridor, account for $152 million in annual retail sales, which contributes to the city's general sales tax revenue. Seafood restaurant chain Skippers Seafood & Chowder House was formerly headquartered in Edmonds.

== Demographics ==
Historical population
Census	Pop.	Note	%±
1900	474		—
1910	1,114		135.0%
1920	936		−16.0%
1930	1,165		24.5%
1940	1,288		10.6%
1950	2,057		59.7%
1960	8,016		289.7%
1970	23,684		195.5%
1980	27,679		16.9%
1990	30,744		11.1%
2000	39,515		28.5%
2010	39,709		0.5%
2020	42,853		7.9%
2024 (est.)	42,871		0.0%
U.S. Decennial Census

Edmonds is the third most populous city in Snohomish County, behind Everett and Marysville, with 42,853 people counted during the 2020 U.S. census. Between 1960 and 1990, Edmonds' population tripled from 8,000 to over 30,000 due to a series of annexations and natural growth. The population growth also brought an influx of Asian immigrants and their descendants to Edmonds, predominantly Koreans, who now make up about 7 percent of the population and are the largest non-white group in the city. From 2010 to 2020, the city's population grew by 7.92 percent; it is expected to reach 45,000 by 2035.

=== 2020 census ===
As of the 2020 census, there were 42,853 people and 18,492 households living in Edmonds, which had a population density of 4,806.3 inhabitants per square mile (1,855.7/km^{2}). There were 19,305 total housing units, of which 95.8% were occupied and 4.2% were vacant or for occasional use. The racial makeup of the city was 74.9% White, 0.6% Native American and Alaskan Native, 3.2% Black or African American, 8.0% Asian, and 0.4% Native Hawaiian and Pacific Islander. Residents who listed another race were 2.9% of the population and those who identified as more than one race were 10.1% of the population. Hispanic or Latino residents of any race were 7.6% of the population.

Of the 18,492 households in Edmonds, 50.6% were married couples living together and 5.8% were cohabitating but unmarried. Households with a male householder with no spouse or partner were 15.5% of the population, while households with a female householder with no spouse or partner were 27.8% of the population. Out of all households, 23.2% had children under the age of 18 living with them and 39.4% had residents who were 65 years of age or older. There were 18,492 occupied housing units in Edmonds, of which 69.0% were owner-occupied and 31.0% were occupied by renters.

The median age in the city was 47.3 years old for all sexes, 44.7 years old for males, and 49.6 years old for females. Of the total population, 18.9% of residents were under the age of 19; 22.5% were between the ages of 20 and 39; 33.6% were between the ages of 40 and 64; and 24.8% were 65 years of age or older. The gender makeup of the city was 47.7% male and 52.3% female.

=== 2010 census ===
As of the 2010 census, there were 39,709 people, 17,381 households, and 10,722 families residing in the city. The population density was 4,461.7 inhabitants per square mile (1,722.7/km^{2}). There were 18,378 housing units at an average density of 2,064.9 per square mile (797.3/km^{2}). The racial makeup of the city was 83.4% White, 2.6% African American, 0.7% Native American, 7.1% Asian, 0.3% Pacific Islander, 1.8% from other races, and 4.1% from two or more races. Hispanic or Latino of any race were 5.3% of the population.

There were 17,381 households, of which 25.0% had children under the age of 18 living with them, 49.0% were married couples living together, 9.1% had a female householder with no husband present, 3.7% had a male householder with no wife present, and 38.3% were non-families. 31.3% of all households were made up of individuals, and 13% had someone living alone who was 65 years of age or older. The average household size was 2.26 and the average family size was 2.82.

The median age in the city was 46.3 years. 18.6% of residents were under the age of 18; 7% were between the ages of 18 and 24; 22.5% were from 25 to 44; 32.8% were from 45 to 64; and 19.1% were 65 years of age or older. The gender makeup of the city was 47.3% male and 52.7% female. The median age and number of retirees in Edmonds is significantly higher than the countywide average.

== Government and politics ==
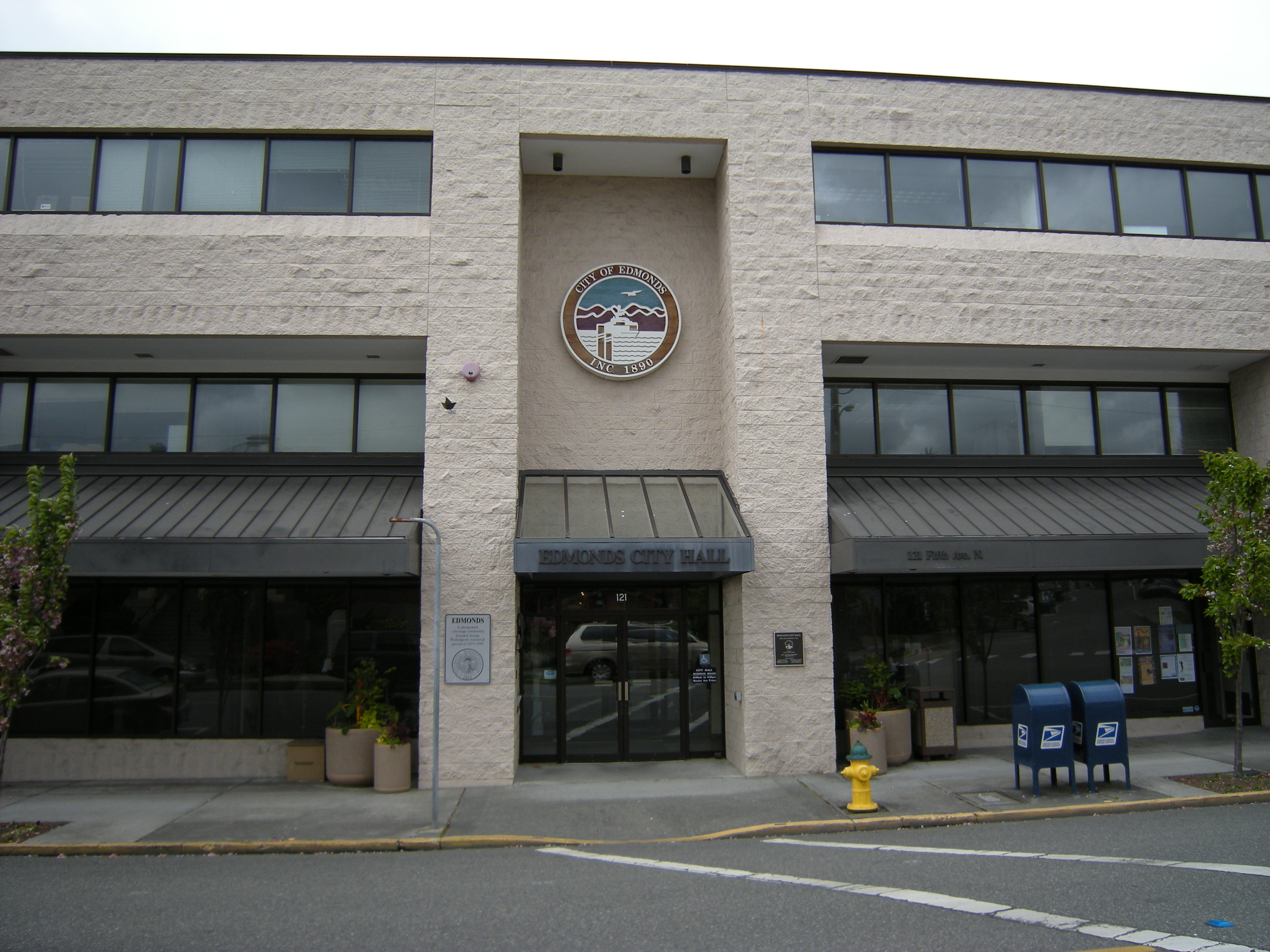
Edmonds city hall

Edmonds operates as a non-charter code city under a mayor–council government, with an elected mayor and a seven-member city council. The mayor is elected to a four-year term and is a nonpartisan position. Mike Rosen was elected mayor in 2023, defeating incumbent and former councilmember Mike Nelson. The city council's seven members are elected at-large to four-year terms and serve as the legislative body that establishes city policy.

The municipal government employs 224 people full-time and operates on an annual budget of $98 million that is mostly funded by property and retail sales taxes. The budget funds the city's various departments, which includes parks and recreation, public works, water utilities, the municipal court, and emergency services. The city's fire department was disbanded in January 2010 in favor of contracted service from Fire District 1 (now South County Fire), a regional entity serving several areas in southwestern Snohomish County; the city was annexed outright into the fire district in 2025.

At the federal level, Edmonds has been part of the 2nd congressional district since 2022 alongside Everett and most of Northwestern Washington. The city had previously been part of the 7th congressional district from 2012 to 2022. At the state level, the city is divided between the 21st and 32nd legislative districts. Edmonds is wholly part of the Snohomish County Council's 3rd district along with Lynnwood and Woodway.

== Culture ==
=== Arts and events ===
Edmonds is considered a major hub for the arts in Snohomish County, with a dozen galleries and other arts facilities. The city government established the Edmonds Art Commission in 1975 and developed its public arts program in the following decades. The city has a collection of 35 outdoor art installations, 22 flower pole structures, and maintains several facilities dedicated to various arts. One of its initiatives was the 1979 conversion of the former Edmonds High School building into the Frances Anderson Cultural and Leisure Center, which hosts art classes, exhibitions, ballet classes, community events, child-care programs, and recreational sports leagues. The city also renovated the high school auditorium into the Edmonds Center for the Arts in 2006, serving as the home of theatrical performances, concerts, performing arts, and films.

The annual Edmonds Arts Festival has been held since 1957, with three days of art exhibitions and performances over Father's Day weekend in June. The festival is one of the largest in the Pacific Northwest, attracting 75,000 visitors, and has 200 participating artists with booths along Main Street and at the Frances Anderson Center. The Cascadia Art Museum opened in 2015 at the location of a former grocery store in downtown Edmonds and focuses on regional Northwest art. Downtown Edmonds also has a single-screen movie theater that was built in the 1920s and remains independently owned and operated.

In addition to the visual arts, Edmonds has several active performing arts organizations. The Driftwood Players host year-round theatrical performances at the Wade James Theatre near Yost Park, while the Phoenix Theatre is based at Firdale Village. The city also hosts the annual Edmonds Jazz Connection over Memorial Day weekend in late May, with several school jazz groups and professional performers. In November 2018, Edmonds was designated as the first creative district in Washington by ArtsWA, the state art agency.

One of the city's main landmarks is a small fountain located at the center of a roundabout on Main Street. The first fountain, which included a twisted sculpture at its center, was installed in 1973 and drew criticism from local residents and merchants for its ugliness. It was destroyed in 1998 by a drunk driver and replaced with a temporary gazebo, which had been used as a prop for a TV series. The gazebo was popular and replaced with a bronze structure in 2000, which was later destroyed by a driver five years later. The gazebo was rebuilt in 2006 and has remained since.

Edmonds is home to a weekly farmers' market that runs from June to October on Saturdays and is sponsored by the Edmonds–South Snohomish County Historical Society. The city also has several annual summer festivals, including the Edmonds Waterfront Festival in early June, the Edmonds Art Festival in mid-June, the Edmonds in Bloom garden festival in July, and the Taste of Edmonds food festival in August.

=== Media ===
Edmonds was served by one weekly newspaper, the Edmonds Tribune-Review, for most of the 20th century. The newspaper was formed by the merger of two rival publications in 1910 and ran until 1982, when it was replaced by an Edmonds section in The Enterprise, a regional newspaper based in Lynnwood. Today, Edmonds is served by The Everett Herald and The Seattle Times. Since 1986, the Edmonds Beacon has published a free weekly newspaper alongside sister papers in Mukilteo and Mill Creek. Edmonds is also home to a local blog, MyEdmondsNews.com, that has covered city affairs since 2009 and is an affiliate of The Seattle Times.

The Edmonds library was established in 1901 and moved into a permanent building funded by philanthropist Andrew Carnegie in 1911. The Carnegie Library served as a dual library and city hall until 1962, when a new civic center opened. The city government built a new library in 1982 that features 20,000 square feet (1,900 m^{2}) of space and an outdoor plaza overlooking Puget Sound. Service was initially contracted out to the Sno-Isle Libraries system until Edmonds was annexed outright in 2001. A pipe on the rooftop deck of the building burst on June 24, 2022, which flooded the library with 60,000 US gallons (230,000 L) over several hours. The Edmonds library was closed indefinitely, but the collection of books and other materials were mostly undamaged by the incident. A temporary location at an adjacent city building opened the following month with most services and limited materials while the original library was repaired and renovated at a cost of $2.5 million. The library reopened on January 13, 2024, with 17,566 square feet (1,631.9 m^{2}) of reading space, community zones, and a children's area.

=== Parks and recreation ===
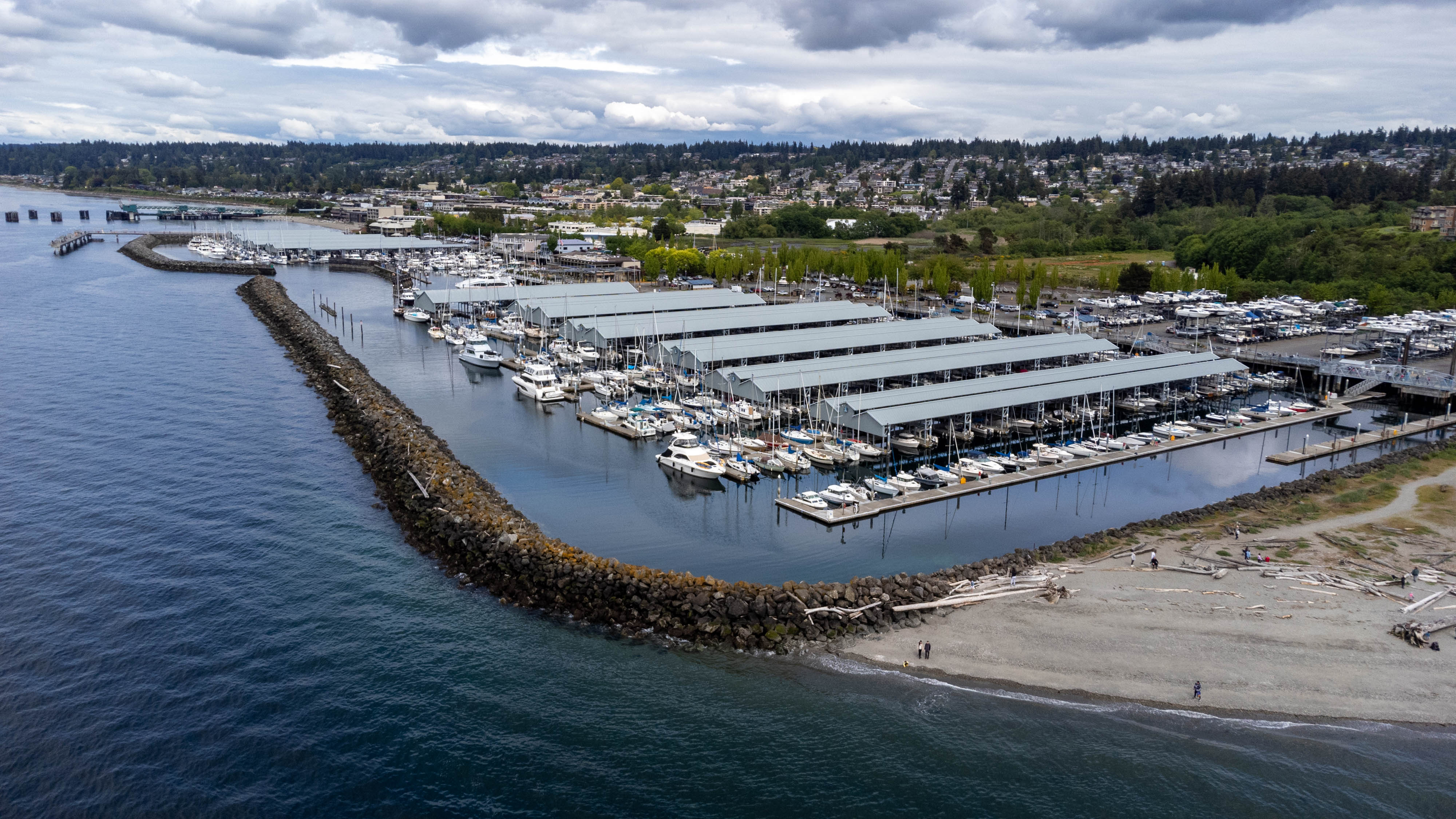
The city's public marina, one of the largest in the Puget Sound region

Edmonds has 23 city parks with 189 acres (76 ha) of open and preserved space, along with several facilities shared with the school district and the county government, totaling 560 acres (230 ha). Downtown Edmonds has several major parks, including the public beach at Brackett's Landing on both sides of the ferry terminal, City Park overlooking Edmonds Marsh, and the future Civic Field. A small 9/11 memorial, including a steel beam from the World Trade Center, is located at a fire station near downtown Edmonds and was dedicated in 2015.

In addition to the neighborhood and community parks in Edmonds, the city also maintains dog parks, sports fields, a seasonal swimming pool, and a skate park. Edmonds Stadium, which was home to high school sports and minor league football and soccer teams (including the North Sound SeaWolves), was opened in 1937 and closed in 2017. The Edmonds senior center first opened in 1967 in a former two-story warehouse building, expanding into a former boat showroom shortly afterward; both were replaced by a new building, named the Edmonds Waterfront Center, that held a virtual opening event in 2021 due to local COVID-19 pandemic restrictions before holding a grand opening the following year.

The city also has several urban forests and natural reserves, which preserve the original vegetation of the area and provide hiking and walking trails. Edmonds Marsh Park, on 28 acres (11 ha) south of downtown, preserves one of the few remaining saltwater marshes in the state and is home to 225 species of bird and several walking trails. The largest wooded space in the city is the county-run Southwest County Park, with 120 acres (49 ha) of land along Olympic View Drive at the north end of the city. In 2023, the Edmonds city government planned to acquire a 10-acre (4.0 ha) shopping center on State Route 99 for use as a public park, but chose not to pursue the $37 million plan in 2024 due to budget issues.

The Port of Edmonds maintains the city's public marina, which has 890 slips and is one of the largest in the Puget Sound region. The marina is dredged to a depth of 13 feet (4.0 m) and located southwest of downtown Edmonds. Further north and offshore from Brackett's Landing, the city also maintains a 27-acre (11 ha) marine park called the Edmonds Underwater Park, which was developed primarily for scuba diving. The park attracts 25,000 visitors annually and is one of the most popular diving spots in the state. The park features man-made reefs, several shipwrecks, a submerged dock, and habitats for marine life.

=== Historical preservation ===
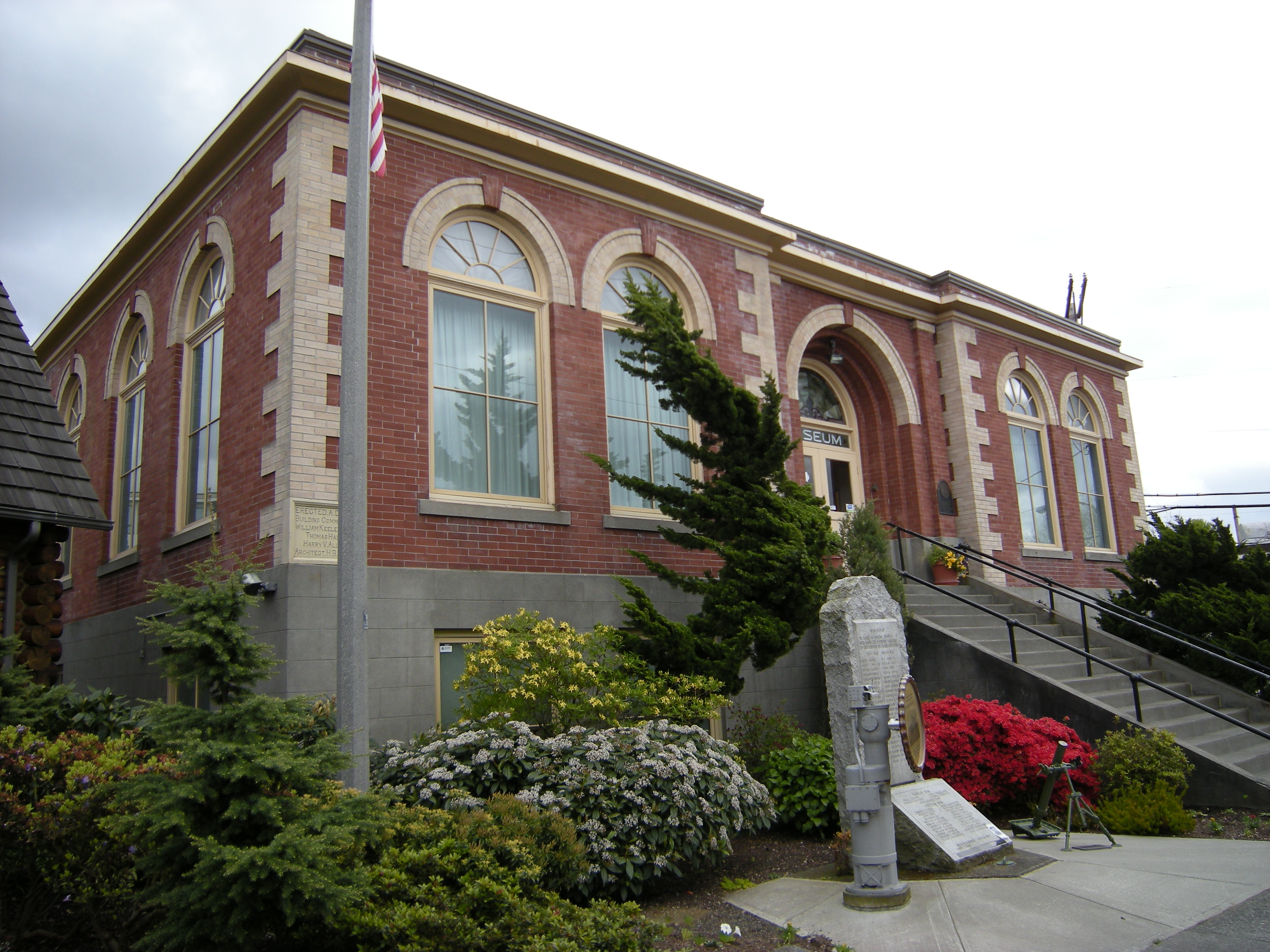
The Carnegie Library is the only building in Edmonds with a national historic designation.

Edmonds' sole entry on the National Register of Historic Places, the Carnegie Library, was added in 1973 and currently houses the Edmonds Historical Museum, a local museum operated by the Edmonds–South Snohomish County Historical Society.

The city government created its own historical commission in 2007 and now maintains a separate register of historic places with 18 buildings. The city's historic designation, unlike the national register, comes without design or building restrictions and primarily includes historic homes and businesses.

=== Sister city ===
Edmonds has one sister city relationship, established in 1988 with Hekinan in Japan's Aichi Prefecture. The relationship is commemorated with a totem pole and plaque on the waterfront. Three times per year, the two cities send visiting delegations, including exchange students, in addition to regularly exchanging gifts and holiday greetings.

== Notable people ==
- Tracie Adix-Zins, collegiate softball coach
- Guy Anderson, painter
- Steven W. Bailey, actor
- Brian Baird, former U.S. Congressman
- Jean-Luc Baker, ice dancer and Olympian
- Brian Basset, cartoonist
- David Bazan, musician
- Sean Beighton, Olympic curling coach and former curler
- George Benson, former Seattle city councilmember
- Alan Stephenson Boyd, former U.S. Secretary of Transportation
- Maria Cantwell, U.S. Senator
- Ryan Couture, MMA fighter
- Annie Crawley, underwater photographer and filmmaker
- Andra Day, singer and actress
- Anna Faris, actress
- Vern Fonk, insurance salesman
- Susan Gould, civil activist and state legislator
- Morris Graves, artist
- Dave Hamilton, professional baseball player
- Bridget Hanley, actress
- Missouri T. B. Hanna, suffragist and newspaper publisher
- Chris Henderson, professional soccer player
- Lori Henry, soccer player and coach
- Ken Jennings, author and Jeopardy! host
- Erik Scott Kimerer, voice actor
- Corey Kispert, professional basketball player
- Sota Kitahara, professional soccer player
- Marko Liias, state senator
- Todd Linden, professional baseball player
- Jay Park, musician
- The Gothard Sisters, musicians
- Paull Shin, state senator
- Rick Steves, travel author and television host
- Rosalynn Sumners, figure skater and Olympic medalist
- Scott Uderitz, professional soccer player
- Helen Westcott, actress

== Education ==
Edmonds is wholly within the boundaries of the Edmonds School District, which also serves Lynnwood, Mountlake Terrace, and Woodway. The city is home to Edmonds Woodway High School, of the district's five high schools, which was formed in 1990 after the merger of Edmonds and Woodway and moved in 1998 to a new campus east of the city. The high school has 1,800 students and hosts an IB Diploma Programme. The school district also operates an alternative high school, Scriber Lake, two K–8 schools, five elementary schools, and two combined elementary–middle schools within Edmonds city limits.

Edmonds is located near the campus of Edmonds College, which actually lies within Lynnwood city limits. The city was formerly home to the private Puget Sound Christian College, which operated from 1977 to 2001 at the former Edmonds High School building (now the Edmonds Center for the Arts). Edmonds is also home to several private schools, which accommodate grade levels from preschool to high school.

== Infrastructure ==
=== Transportation ===
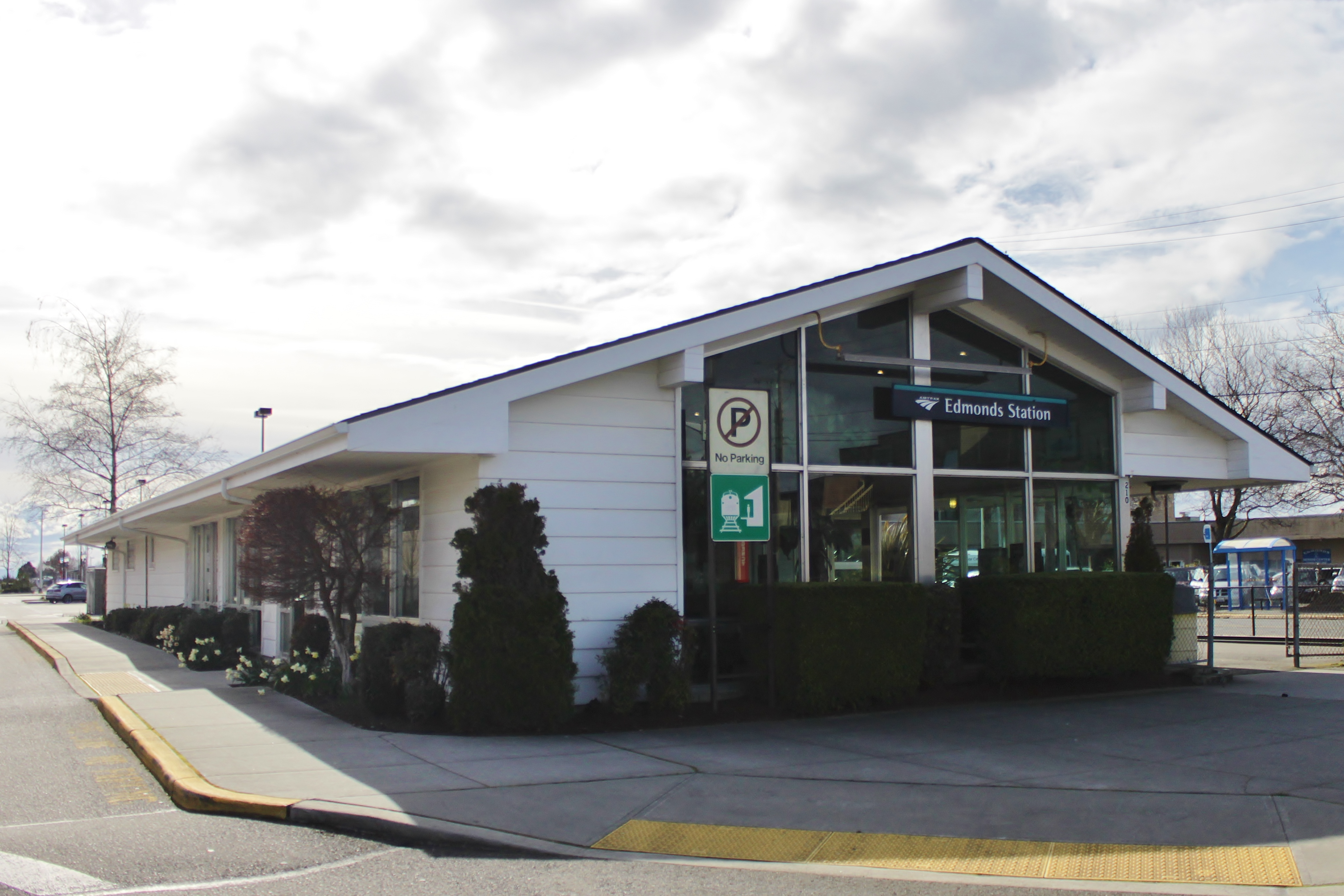
The Edmonds train station, served by Amtrak, Sounder commuter trains, and buses

Edmonds is served by several modes of transportation that converge in the downtown area, including roads, railroads, ferries, and buses. The city's ferry terminal is located at the west end of Main Street at Brackett's Landing Park and is served by a ferry route to Kingston on the Kitsap Peninsula. From 1979 to 1980, Washington State Ferries also ran ferries to Port Townsend during repairs to the Hood Canal Bridge. The Edmonds train station lies a block southwest of the terminal and is served by Amtrak's intercity Cascades and Empire Builder trains as well as Sound Transit's Sounder commuter train. These trains operate on the BNSF Railway, which runs along the Edmonds waterfront and is primarily used for freight transport. Two state highways, State Route 104 and State Route 524, connect the downtown area to eastern Edmonds and other points in southern Snohomish County and northern King County. An additional state highway, State Route 99, runs north–south in eastern Edmonds and connects the city's commercial district to Seattle and Everett.

Public transportation in Edmonds is provided by Community Transit, which serves most of Snohomish County and covers 74 percent of Edmonds residents. Community Transit's local buses run on major streets and connect downtown Edmonds to transit hubs at Aurora Village, Lynnwood City Center station, and Edmonds Community College. It also operates the Swift Blue Line on State Route 99, a bus rapid transit service connecting Aurora Village and Everett. Until 2024, Community Transit operated direct express buses to from park and ride lots in Edmonds to Downtown Seattle and the University District. They were replaced by the Link light rail extension to Lynnwood and a new express bus that connects Downtown Edmonds to Mountlake Terrace station.

=== Utilities ===
Electric power in Edmonds is provided by the Snohomish County Public Utility District (PUD), a consumer-owned public utility that serves all of Snohomish County. In 2017, the city signed a clean energy pledge that would mandate the use of renewable energy sources to generate all of its electricity by 2025. Puget Sound Energy provides natural gas service to the city's residents and businesses.

The city's municipal tap water is provided by the Alderwood Water District, which sources its water from Everett's Spada Lake Reservoir. The city government maintains its own sanitary sewer and wastewater treatment services, including a treatment plant in downtown; wastewater is also sent to the regional Brightwater plant near Maltby, which was originally planned to be built in Edmonds. Disposal of garbage, recycling, and yard waste is contracted by the city government to three private companies serving different areas of Edmonds.

=== Health care ===
Edmonds is home to one general hospital, a branch of Swedish Health Services, which is located on State Route 99. It opened on January 26, 1964, as Stevens Memorial Hospital (named for Washington territorial governor Isaac Stevens), and was initially run as a private facility until 1967, when Snohomish County Public Hospital District No. 2 was formed to oversee it. The public hospital district was led by a five-member elected board of commissioners from within the district, which eventually encompassed Brier, Edmonds, Esperance, Lynnwood, Mountlake Terrace, and Woodway as well as parts of Bothell and unincorporated Snohomish County. Stevens Hospital was expanded with the addition of a nine-story medical tower in 1972 as demand increased from population growth in surrounding areas, but demand faltered as mismanagement plagued its reputation among locals in the early 2000s. The public hospital district ultimately reached an agreement with Swedish in 2010, with the latter leasing the hospital from the former starting on September 1; the former rebranded as the Verdant Health Commission the following year and refocused its efforts as a public health department.

Prior to Stevens/Swedish, a general hospital existed in downtown Edmonds in the mid-1920s, while another one existed in the early 1950s. The hospital sits at the center of a district of medical and professional services offices along State Route 99.

== See also ==
- North American Martyrs Parish
