= List of Carnegie libraries in New York =

The following list of Carnegie libraries in New York provides detailed information on United States Carnegie libraries in New York, where 107 public libraries were built from 42 grants (totaling $6,416,821) awarded by the Carnegie Corporation of New York from 1899 to 1917. In addition, academic libraries were built at 3 institutions (totaling $247,949).

Of the 107 public libraries, 66 were built in New York City alone and are listed separately.

== Key ==
Building still operating as a library
Building standing, but now serving another purpose
Building no longer standing
Building listed on the National Register of Historic Places
Building contributes to a historic district on the National Register of Historic Places

== Public libraries ==
	Library	City or town	Image	Date granted	Grant amount	Location	Notes
1	Amsterdam	Amsterdam		Feb 4, 1902	$25,000	28 Church St.	Construction began 1902, opened 1903
2	Andover	Andover		Nov 21, 1911	$5,000	40 Main St.	Opened 1912
3	Binghamton	Binghamton		Apr 26, 1902	$75,000	78 Exchange St.	Open 1904–2002
4	Bolivar	Bolivar		Apr 10, 1909	$5,000	390 Main St.	Opened 1910
5	Canastota	Canastota		Jan 10, 1902	$10,000	102 W. Center St.	
6	Catskill	Catskill		Feb 2, 1901	$20,000	1 Franklin St.	
7	Chatham	Chatham		Aug 16, 1901	$15,000	11 Woodbridge Ave	Opened 1905
8	Dunkirk	Dunkirk		Feb 20, 1904	$25,000	536 Central Ave.	
9	Elmira	Elmira		Jan 28, 1916	$70,000	400 E. Church St.	The new Steele Library at 101 E. Church opened in 1979.
10	Fleischmanns	Fleischmanns		1901	$5,000	1017 Main St.	
11	Franklinville	Franklinville		May 8, 1914	$2,200	5 N. Main St.	
12	Fulton	Fulton		Mar 14, 1902	$15,000	160 S. 1st St.	
13	Gloversville	Gloversville		Mar 8, 1901	$50,000	58 E. Fulton St.	
14	Hamburg	Hamburg		Jul 23, 1914	$5,000	102 Buffalo St.	
15	Hornell	Hornell		Jan 22, 1903	$25,000	64 Genesee St.	
16	Johnstown	Johnstown		Mar 6, 1901	$16,000	38 S. Market St.	Construction started in 1902.
17	Kingston	Kingston		Apr 26, 1902	$30,000	405 Broadway	Now a part of Kingston High School. The current library is located at 55 Franklin St.
18	Lackawanna	Lackawanna		May 3, 1917	$30,000	560 Ridge Rd.	
19	Mount Vernon	Mount Vernon		Feb 19, 1901	$72,000	28 S. 1st Ave.	
20	New Rochelle	New Rochelle		Mar 14, 1901	$60,000	662 Main St.	
21	Niagara Falls	Niagara Falls		Mar 8, 1901	$50,000	1022 Main St.	
22	North Tonawanda	North Tonawanda		Dec 27, 1902	$20,000	240 Goundry St.	
23	Northport	Northport		May 21, 1913	$10,000	215 Main St.	
24	Nyack	Nyack		Dec 21, 1901	$15,000	59 S. Broadway	
25	Olean	Olean		Nov 27, 1906	$40,000	116 S. Union St.	
26	Ossining	Ossining		Dec 23, 1911	$26,000		
27	Patchogue	Patchogue		Jan 8, 1905	$15,000	160 W. Main St.	Open 1908–1981, moved to a temporary location in 2012. Moved to current location in 2013, re-opened in 2016 as Teen Center at the Patchogue-Medford Carnegie Library.
28	Penn Yan	Penn Yan		Jan 6, 1903	$10,000	214 Main St.	
29	Perry	Perry		Jul 13, 1912	$12,000	70 Main St. N.	
30	Port Jervis	Port Jervis		Feb 21, 1901	$30,000	138 Pike St.	
31	Rockville Centre	Rockville Centre		Dec 14, 1903	$10,000	11 Clinton Ave.	
32	Salamanca	Salamanca		Feb 3, 1917	$17,500	45 S. Main St.	Open 1920–1976, now a law office
33	Saugerties	Saugerties		Sep 25, 1914	$12,500	91 Washington Ave.	
34	Schenectady	Schenectady		Feb 13, 1901	$50,000		Open 1903–1970, now Webster House, a dormitory at Union College
35	Solvay	Solvay		Jan 13, 1903	$10,000	615 Woods Rd.	
36	Syracuse	Syracuse		Jan 15, 1901	$200,000	335 Montgomery St.	Open 1905–1988
37	Theresa	Theresa		Jan 18, 1910	$7,500	301 Main St.	
38	Ticonderoga	Ticonderoga		Mar 8, 1904	$7,000	161 Montcalm St.	
39	Warsaw	Warsaw		Feb 5, 1904	$12,500	130 N. Main St.	
40	White Plains	White Plains		Dec 20, 1904	$40,000		
41	Yonkers	Yonkers		Mar 8, 1901	$50,000		

== Academic libraries ==
	Institution	Locality	Image	Year granted	Grant amount	Location	Notes
1	Alfred University	Alfred		Mar 26, 1906; Jan 2, 1913	$10,000 $20,000		Renamed Jordan Hall in 2021, houses Alfred University administration and finance offices
2	Syracuse University	Syracuse		Mar 15, 1905	$150,000		One of the Comstock Tract Buildings
3	Wells College	Aurora		Feb 20, 1908; December 22, 1922	$57,949 $10,000		Open 1911–1968, now Cleveland Hall

== See also ==
- List of libraries in the United States
