= Niagara Falls Public Library =

Niagara Falls Public Library may refer to:

- Niagara Falls Public Library (New York), a public library system in the city of Niagara Falls, New York, United States
  - Carnegie Library (Niagara Falls, New York), a former Carnegie library that once housed the Niagara Falls, New York Public Library.
- Niagara Falls Public Library (Ontario), a public library system in the city of Niagara Falls, Ontario, Canada
