= Mrs. Seymour H. Knox House =

The Mrs. Seymour H. Knox House
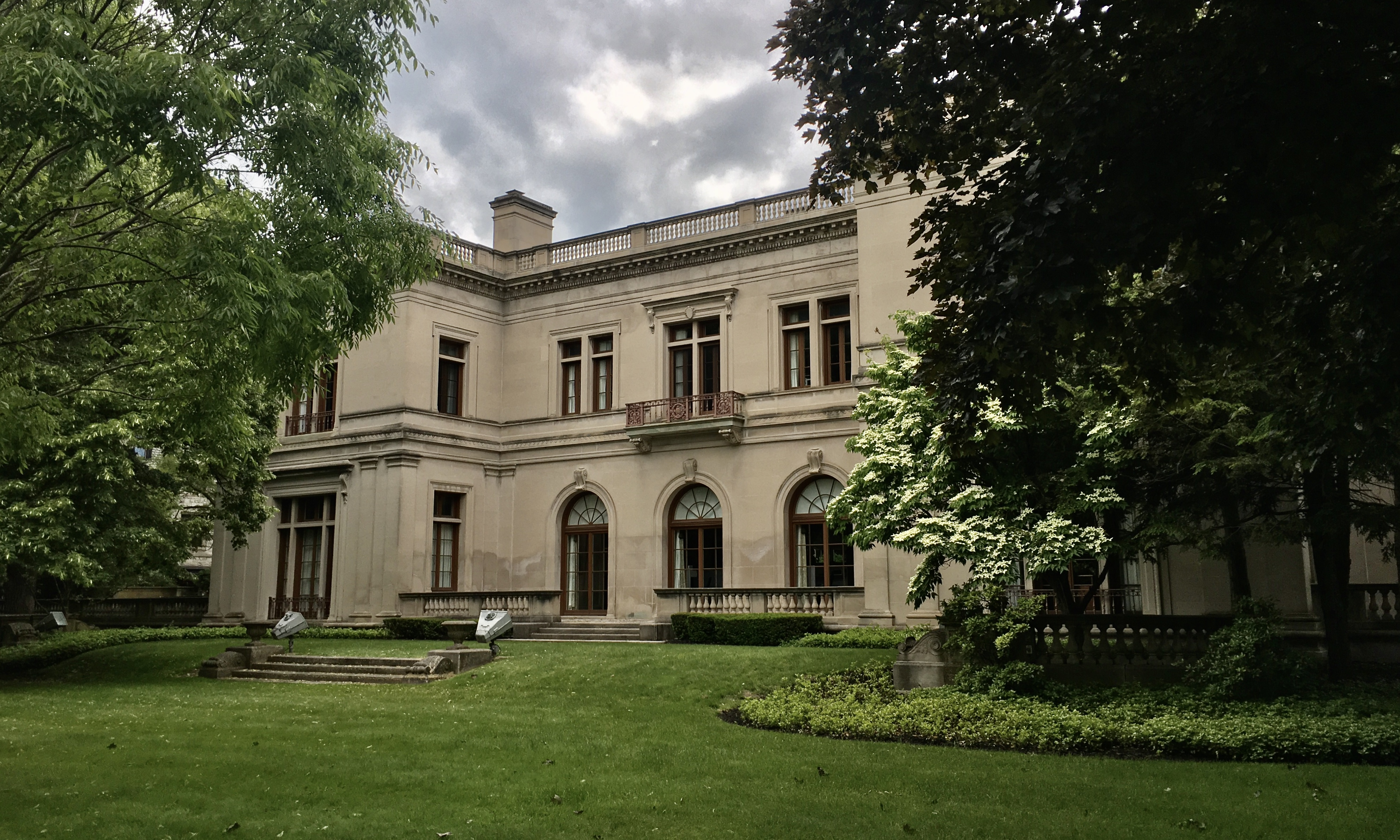
- The Knox Mansion, 2020
- Interactive map of the The Mrs. Seymour H. Knox House area

General information
- Architectural style: Renaissance Revival
- Location: 800 Delaware Avenue, Buffalo, NY
- Coordinates: 42°54′22″N 78°52′21″W
- Construction started: 1915
- Completed: 1918
- Owner: Ross M. Cellino

Technical details
- Floor area: 48,000 sq. ft.

Design and construction
- Architect: C. P. H. Gilbert

The Mrs. Seymour H. Knox House (also known as the Grace Millard Knox House) is a 48,000-square-foot mansion located in Buffalo, New York, which was built between 1915 and 1918. The house was designed by architect C. P. H. Gilbert for Grace Millard Knox, widow of Seymour H. Knox. The building is a contributing property to the Delaware Avenue Historic District designated in 1974.

== History ==
In 1915, Grace (née Millard) Knox, the recent widow of Seymour H. Knox (who co-founded F. W. Woolworth Company with his cousins Charles and Frank W. Woolworth), purchased property on Delaware Avenue north of Summer Street. The Knoxes lived at 1035 Delaware Avenue previously. Grace hired New York City architect C. P. H. Gilbert to replace an older Italianate house that stood on the property with a new residence. The resulting structure was an extravagant stone mansion built over the course of three years that was completed in 1918. The house was designed in the French Renaissance style with a symmetrical façade and a U-shaped floor plan. The projecting side pavilions flank a recessed central elevation with French doors on the ground floor topped with round arches.

After the house was completed, Grace moved in with her three children, Seymour Jr., Marjorie, and Dorothy Knox. She lived there until her death in 1936, after which her eldest daughter, Marjorie, inherited the house. Marjorie sold it to the Montefiore Club in 1969.

=== Recent ownership ===
The Montefiore Club added a 20,000-square-foot addition to the building to house athletic facilities to the rear of the building, which included a gym, locker rooms, and three squash courts. In 1978, CTG (formerly Computer Task Group) purchased the property, which they used as their corporate offices.

In December 2020, it was announced that attorney Ross Cellino purchased the Knox Mansion for $2,470,000 from Computer Task Group in June 2020. Cellino announced that he planned to make the house the new corporate headquarters for Cellino Law, the law firm he formed after the breakup of Cellino & Barnes. Cellino also plans to fully restore the mansion.

=== Previous Knox residences ===
Before Grace Millard Knox and her children moved into the Gilbert designed mansion on Delaware Avenue, they successively lived at 414 Porter Avenue (a Queen Anne style residence designed by Milton Beebe) from about 1890 to 1894, 467 Linwood Avenue (a slightly smaller Queen Anne style residence) from 1894 to 1904, and 1035 Delaware Avenue (a Beaux-Arts style residence executed by Niagara Falls architect Edgar Eugene Joralemon) from 1904 until the Knox family moved to 806 Delaware Avenue (today known as 800 Delaware Avenue). After they moved, the family continued to own 1035 Delaware which they rented out until 1922, when it was sold to the Roman Catholic Diocese of Buffalo for use as the official residence of the Bishop.

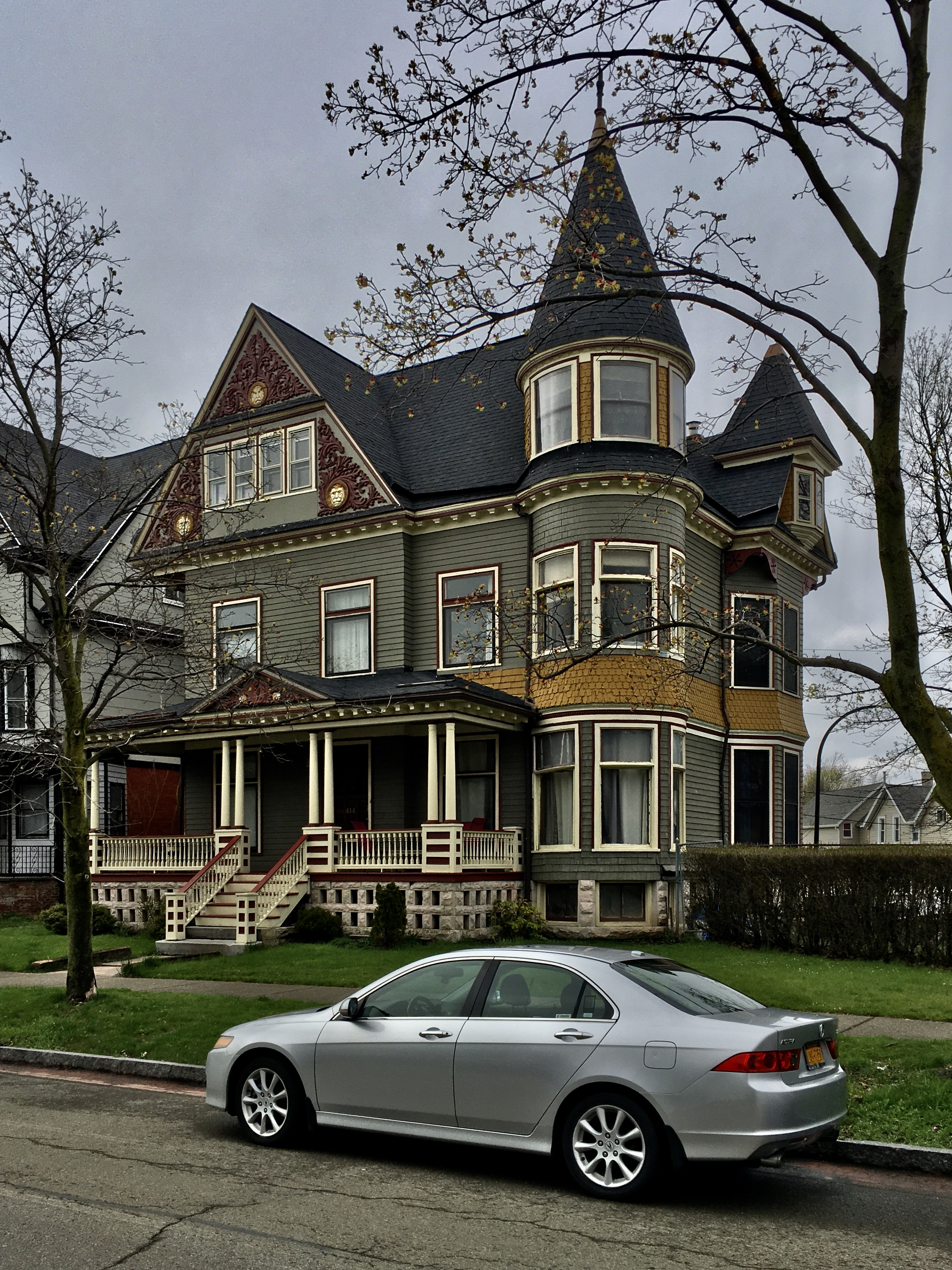
414 Porter Avenue (c. 1890)

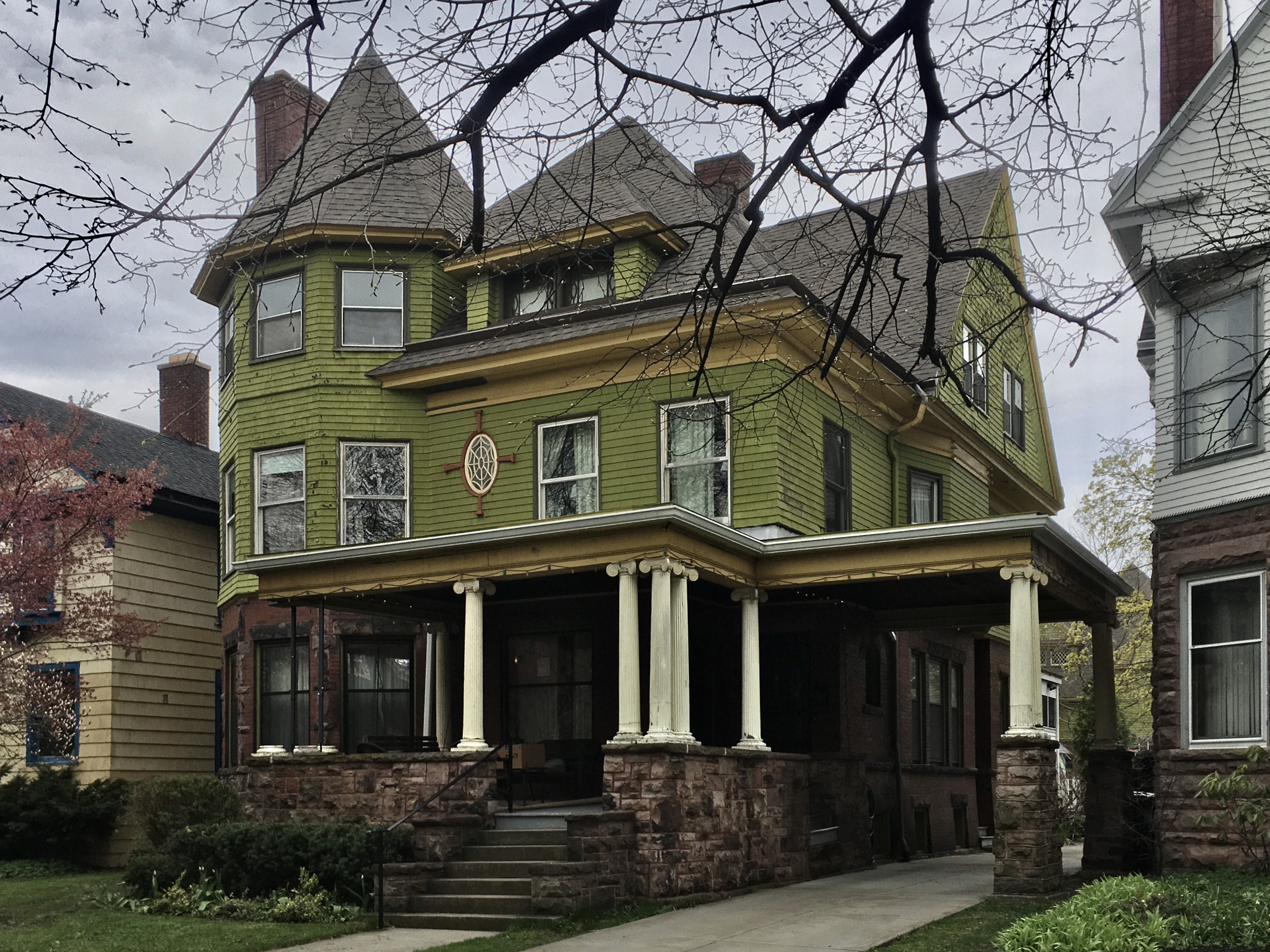
467 Linwood Avenue (1890)

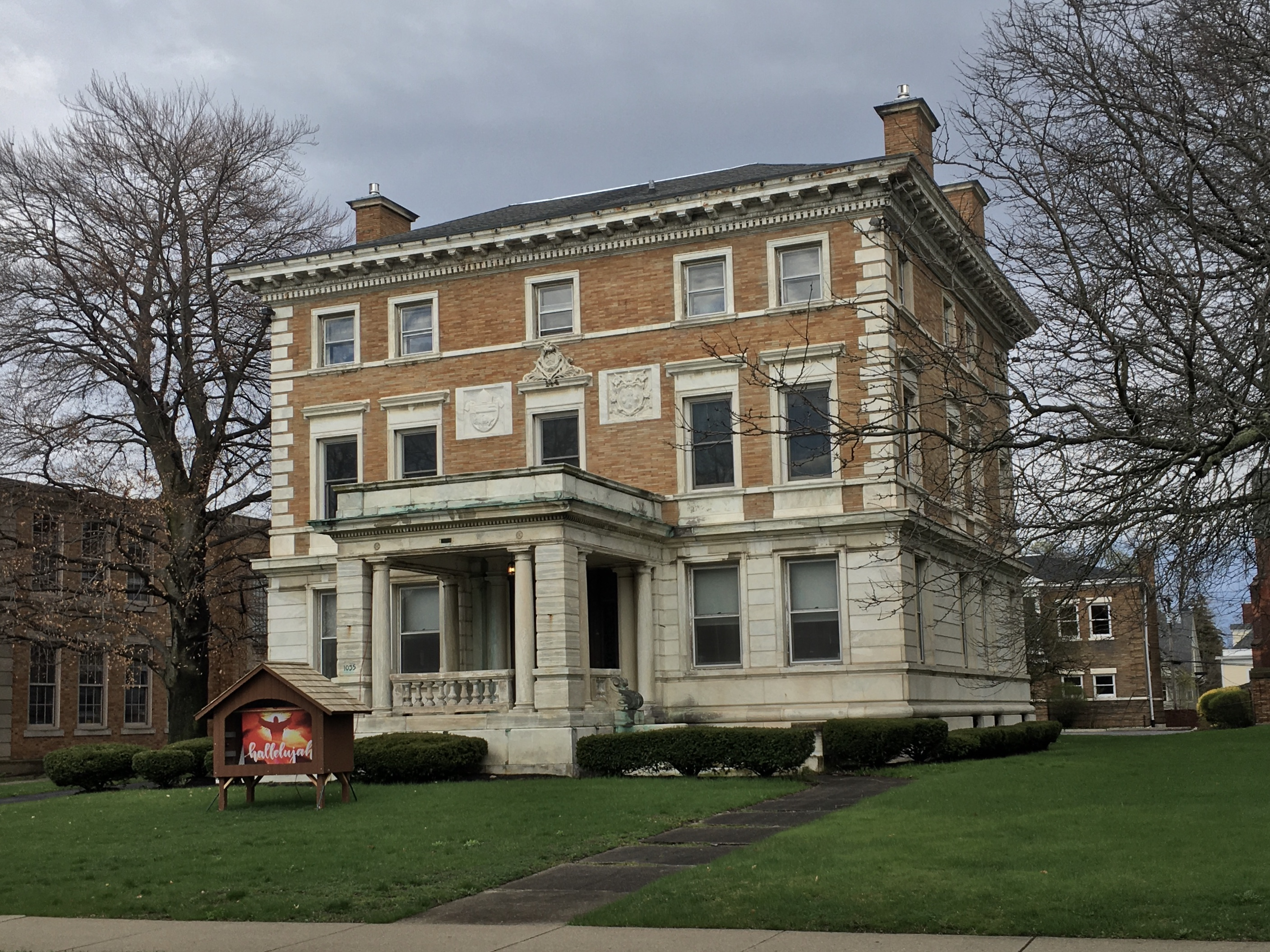
1035 Delaware Avenue (1904)

== See also ==
- Delaware Avenue Historic District (Buffalo, New York)
- Architecture of Buffalo, New York
