= Carnegie Library (North Tonawanda, New York) =

- U.S. National Register of Historic Places
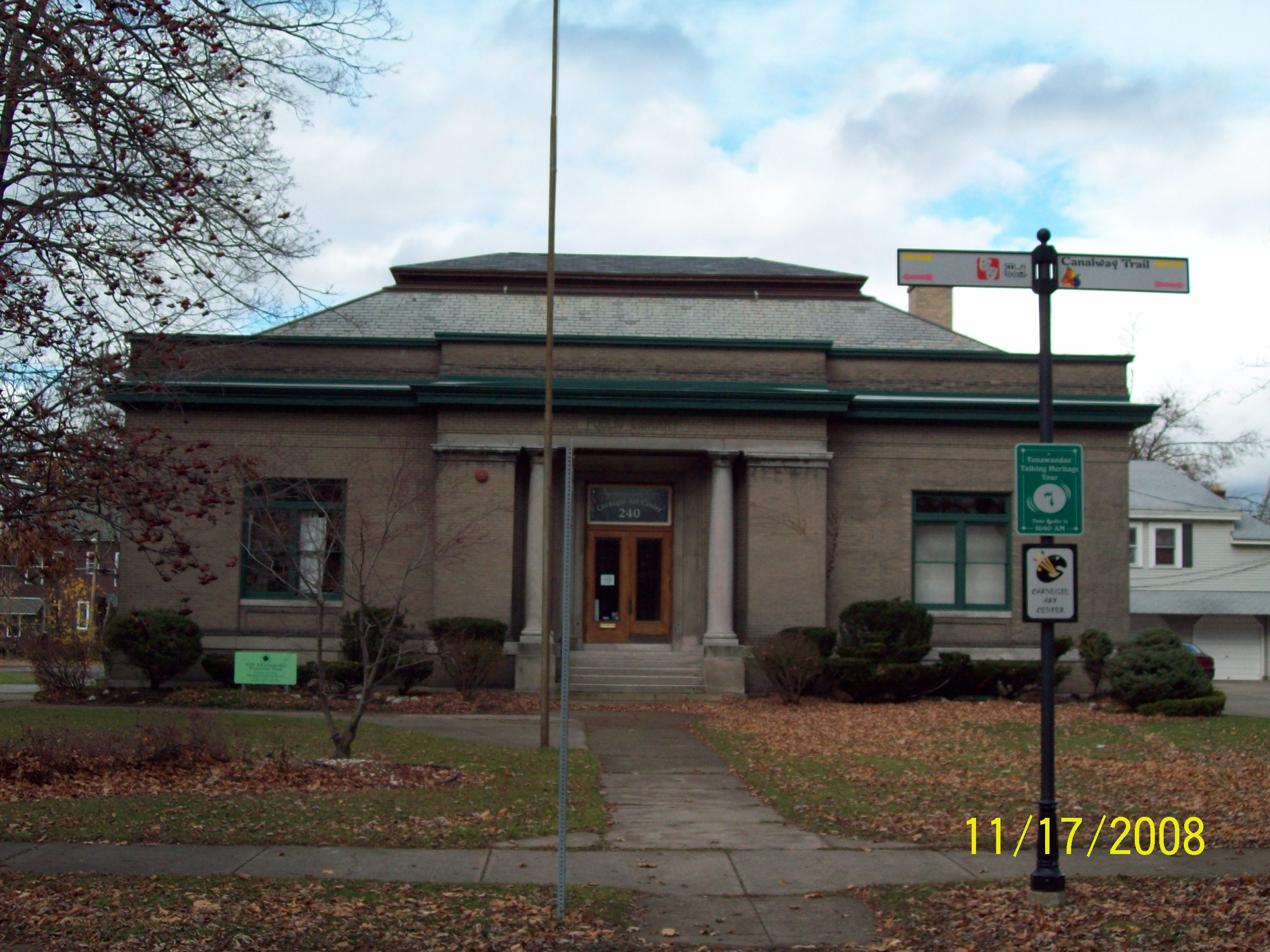
- North Tonawanda Carnegie Library, November 2008

- Location within New York Location within the United States
- Location: 240 Goundry St., North Tonawanda, New York
- Coordinates: 43°1′35″N 78°52′9″W
- Built: 1903
- Architect: E. E. Joralemon
- Architectural style: Classical Revival
- NRHP reference No.: 95000851
- Added to NRHP: July 14, 1995

The Carnegie Library in North Tonawanda, New York is a historic Carnegie library building designed and built in 1903 with funds provided by the philanthropist Andrew Carnegie. It is in Niagara County, New York, and one of 3,000 Carnegie libraries constructed between 1885 and 1919, including 107 in New York State.

Carnegie provided $20,000 toward the construction of the North Tonawanda Library. It is a low one-story brick structure with a basement in the Classical Revival style. The interior features wood paneling, elaborate plaster moldings and trim, mosaic tile floors, and a large stained glass skylight.

The building functioned as a library until 1976 when it became home to the Carnegie Art Center of the Tonawandas' Council on the Arts.

It was listed on the National Register of Historic Places in 1995.

== See also ==
- List of Carnegie libraries in New York
