= Olean School No. 10 =

- U.S. National Register of Historic Places
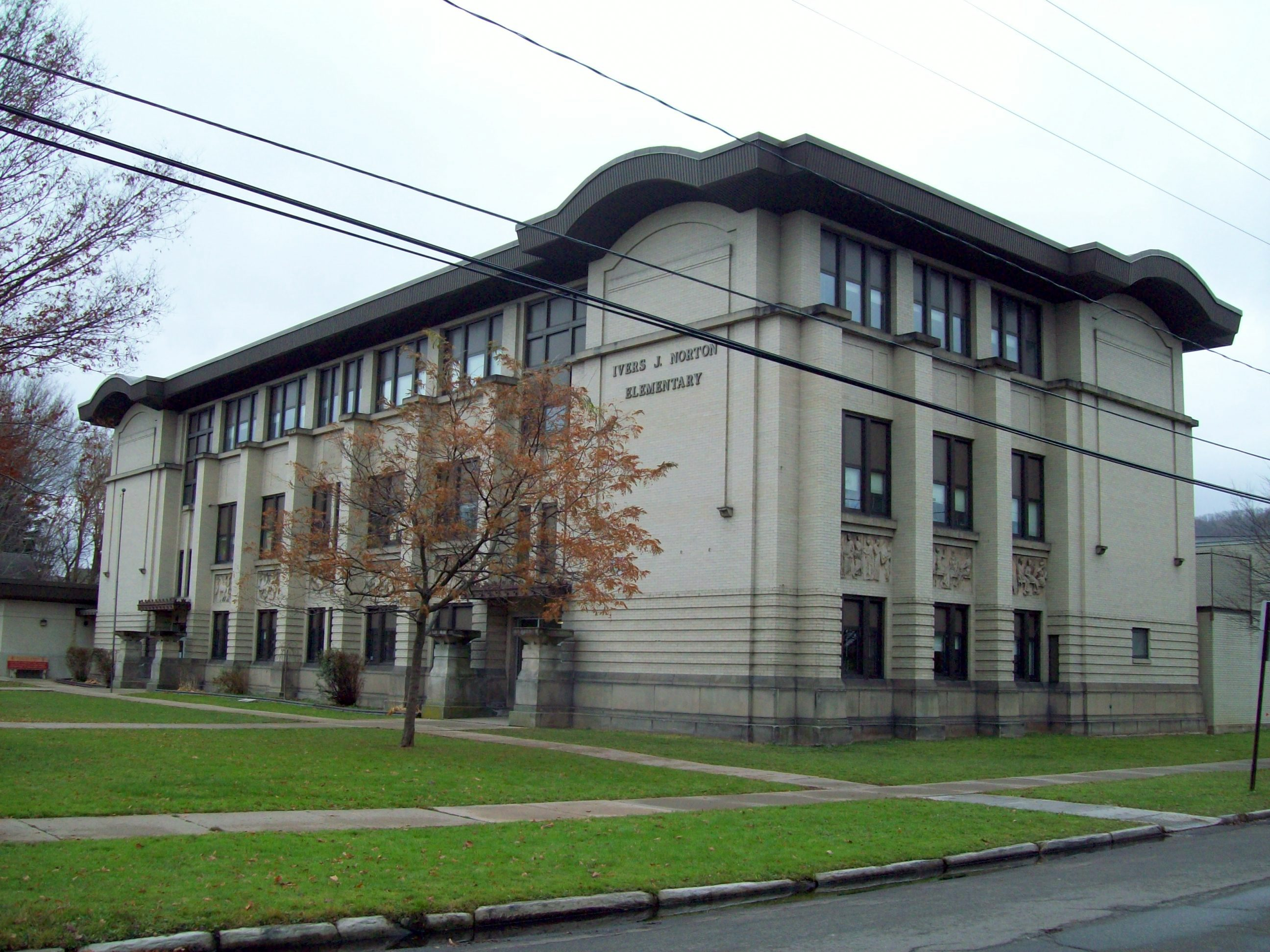
- Olean School No. 10, November 2010

- Location within New York Location within the United States
- Location: 411 W. Henley St., Olean, New York
- Coordinates: 42°4′32″N 78°26′4″W
- Area: 1.26 acres (0.51 ha)
- Built: 1908-1909
- Architect: Edgar E. Joralemon
- Architectural style: Prairie School
- NRHP reference No.: 10000810
- Added to NRHP: July 11, 1985

Olean School No. 10, now known as Ivers J. Norton School, is a historic school building located at Olean in Cattaraugus County, New York. It was designed and built in 1908–1909, in the Prairie School style. It is three stories, nine bays wide and four bays deep. It is constructed of brick and stone and topped with a flat roof with deep overhangs. It features "Boys" and "Girls" entrances and large brick engaged columns on the front facade. It remained in operation as a school building until 2012, when it (along with the Boardmanville school) was closed as a result of budget cuts implemented in the wake of New York's property tax cap. In late 2014 the school was purchased by a pastor and turned into a church.

It was listed on the National Register of Historic Places in 2010.
