= School No. 7 (Dunkirk, New York) =

- U.S. National Register of Historic Places
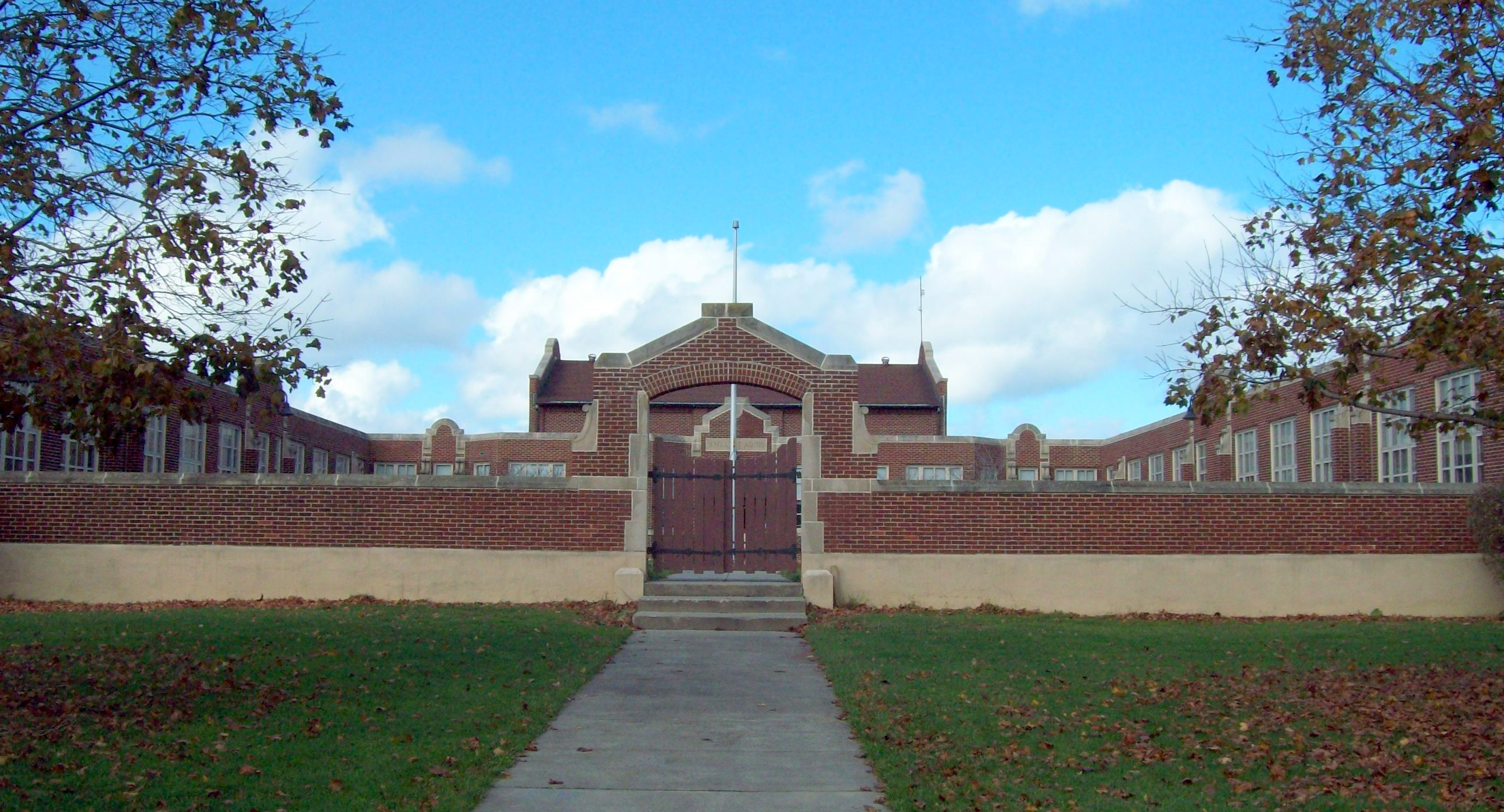
- School No. 7, November 2010

- Location within New York Location within the United States
- Location: Jct. of E. Lake Shore Dr. and N. Serval St., Dunkirk, New York
- Coordinates: 42°29′46″N 79°19′0″W
- Built: 1920
- Architect: Edgar Eugene Joralemon; Baily, E.J.
- Architectural style: Late 19th And Early 20th Century American Movements
- NRHP reference No.: 92000068
- Added to NRHP: March 05, 1992

School No. 7 is a historic school building located at Dunkirk in Chautauqua County, New York. It is significant as a one-story school building of the early 20th century. It was designed about 1916-1919 and built about 1920–1921.

It was listed on the National Register of Historic Places in 1992 by the efforts of the neighborhood in which the school resides and against the better judgement of the rest of the city that would have liked the location return to private residences or businesses. The location in question is about 0.4 miles from a public beach along Lake Erie and an ideal location for beach front restaurants and other entertainment venues.
