= Niagara Falls Public Library (New York) =

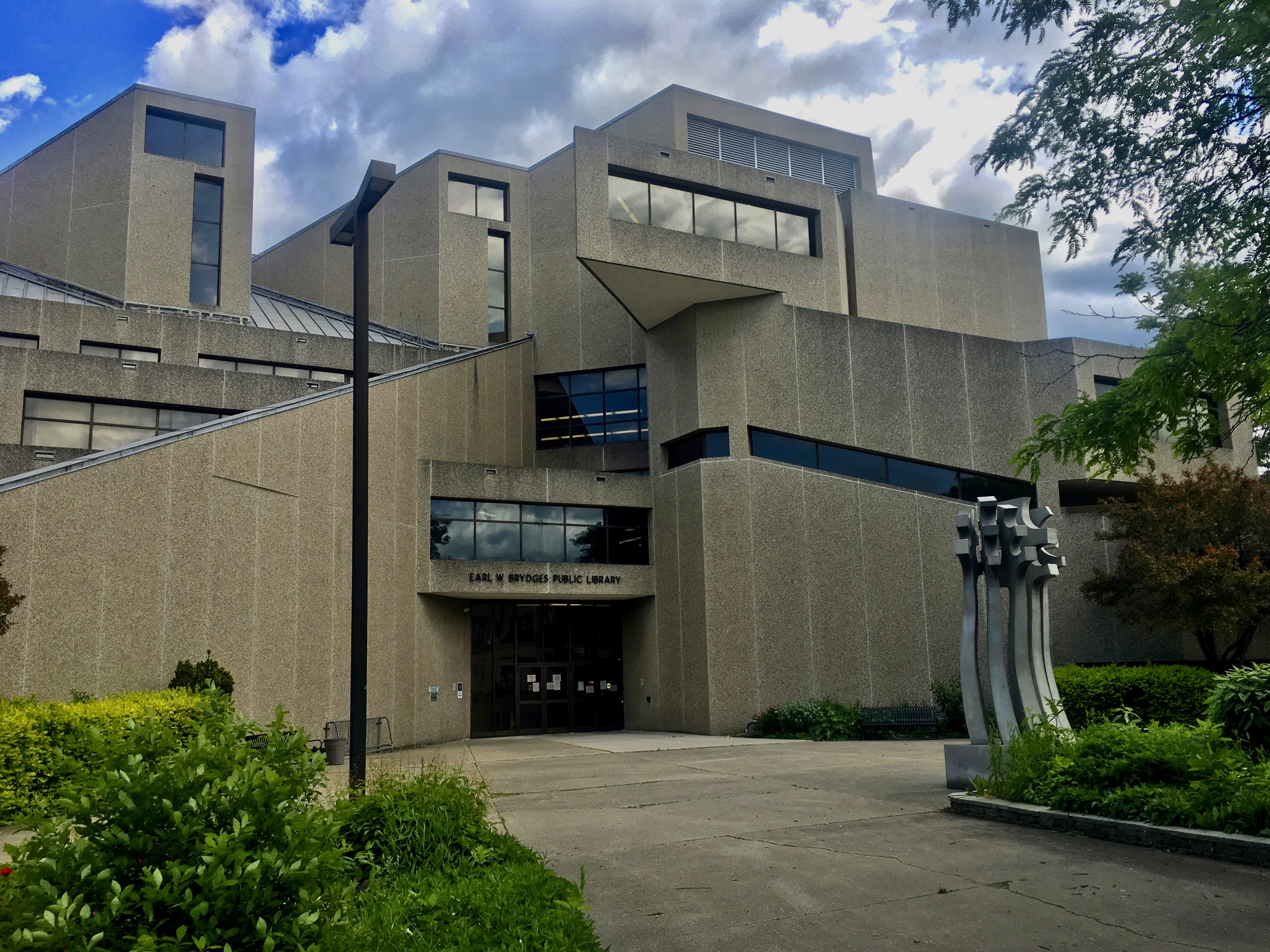
- Main Library (Earl W. Brydges Building)
- 43.101846°N 79.0518601°W
- Location: 1425 Main St., Niagara Falls, New York
- Architect: Paul Rudolph

The Niagara Falls Public Library, located at 1425 Main Street in Niagara Falls in Niagara County, New York. The Main Library is the largest library in the Niagara-Orleans-Genesee Library System. The Main Library in the Earl W. Brydges Building was built in 1974 by Paul Rudolph and the LaSalle Branch is located at 8728 Buffalo Avenue in the LaSalle District of Niagara Falls. In 2018 a Niagara Falls councillor proposed establishing a library authority. The library succeeded; Niagara Falls' Carnegie Library opened in 1904 and is now used as offices.

== Branches ==
- Earl W. Brydges Building - 1425 Main Street
- LaSalle Branch - 8728 Buffalo Avenue

The Earl W. Brydges Building was designed by Paul Rudolph and built by Albert Elia Company.

== History ==
The Brydges Building opened March 9, 1974, after the library's collections had outgrown the former Carnegie Library down the street. As of 1995, the library's Centennial, more than 400,000 printed volumes, periodicals, media, and a wide variety of other publications and documents were located within the library. The third floor is home to a vibrant Local History Department, containing more than 10,000 books and thousands of pictures and other ephemera, worked to preserve the rich history of Niagara Falls. Special youth collections and services were provided in a Children's Department, and the Audio Visual Department was expanding its services to meet the high demand for video recordings and other media.

The Niagara Falls Public Library was originally built in 1814 when head man General Parkhurst Whitney and a group founded the "Grand Niagara Library" with a collection of 40 books. The library extended to 502 books in 1852 and was housed in the Third Street School. With the expansion of so many books, the library outgrew its old home and moved into the Frontier Mart on Falls Street. During this time, the library applied to the New York State Education Department for a legal charter. The library was eventually moved to two large rooms in the Arcade Building on Falls Street. The library opened its doors on February 1, 1895, and on February 28, 1895, the legal charter for the library was signed by Melvil Dewey, marking the official opening of the Niagara Falls Public Library.

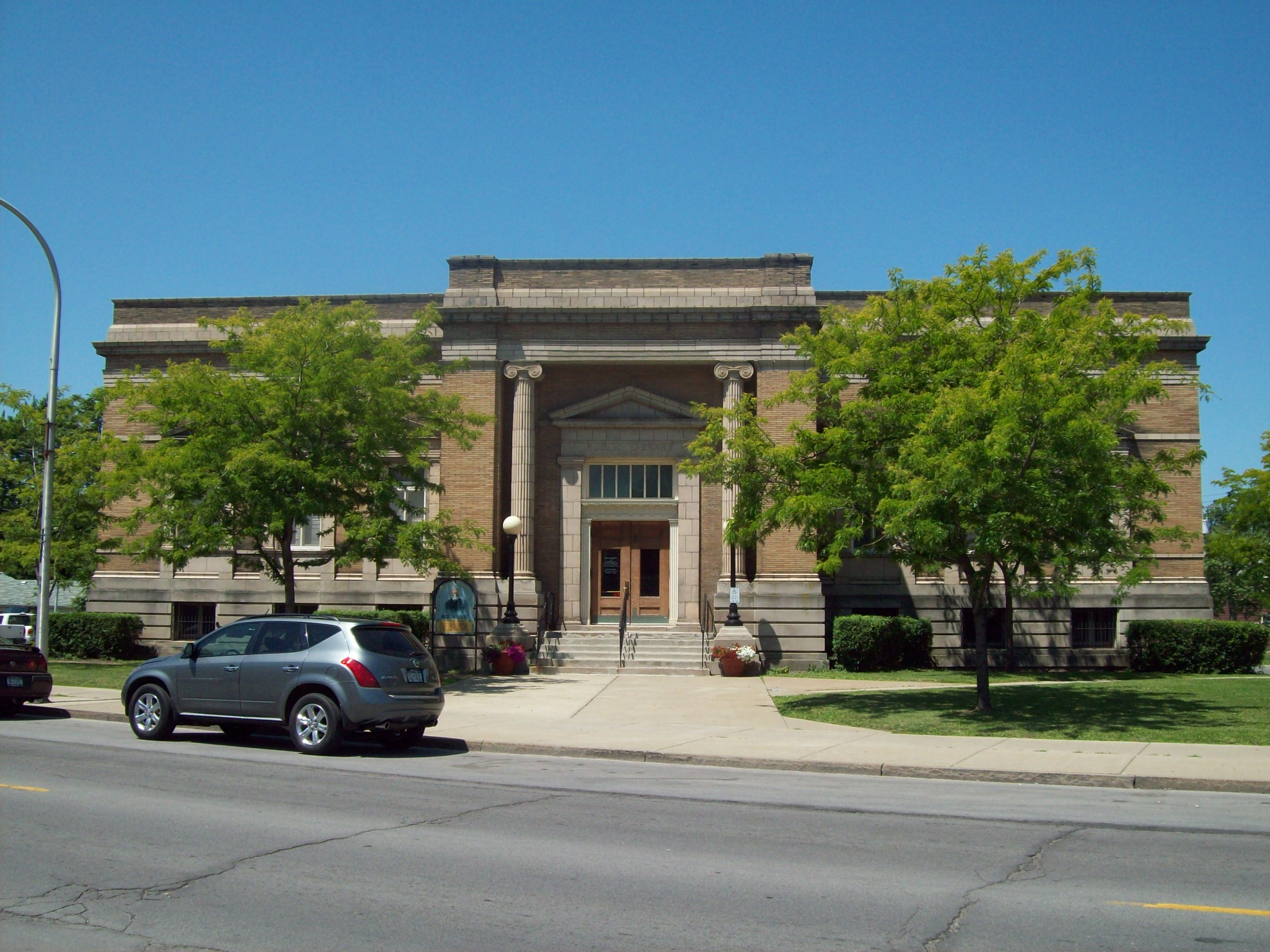
The Carnegie building where the library was formerly located

In 1901, Niagara Falls was awarded a $50,000 grant from the Carnegie Foundation and a new site on Main Street was chosen for a brand-new library building. The Carnegie building was opened in 1904, and was designed by E.E. Joralemon, a local architect. This building was designed to hold 50,000 volumes. By the 1950s, the building held more than 100,000 volumes, and was vacated by 1974 for the new Earl W. Brydges building.

Paul Rudolph was selected by city officials in November 1968 to design the new library building. The new building was 87,800 square feet, a much larger space compared with the previous building's 12,000 square feet. On October 26, 1970, a resolution was passed by Niagara Falls City Council naming the building in honor of Senator Earl W. Brydges. Groundbreaking took place in 1970, and completion of construction on the building occurred in 1973. The city refused to take possession of the building due to water leakage and damage that had been occurring for several years during construction. Repairs were made, and the building was rededicated in 1982. The City of Niagara Falls sued both Rudolph and the construction company, Albert Elia, for damages, and the lawsuits were settled in 1984.

In 2015, The Buffalo News named the Earl W. Brydges building as one of the top ten unloved structures in the region but an example of brutalist architecture with many fans who visit the building every year.

In 1927, the Village of LaSalle became part of the Niagara Falls area, bringing with it a library, post office, police office, and a jail. The library of LaSalle became a place of joint community where kids would read picture books and adults would meet in the main reading room. The library was directed and run by Mrs. Alfreda Walker and after Mrs. Fred Campbell. Throughout the thirty years that LaSalle was a part of the Niagara Falls library branch, many other libraries were introduced on Niagara Street, 14th Street, and Pine Avenue. In the 1950s and 60s, bookmobiles were created, and the one library to survive was the LaSalle branch. The library expanded once the post office relocated in the 1950s. Thus the externalities that come with a library flourished, like staff number, and collection size, and in 2008 LaSalle became the sole branch of the Niagara Falls Library branch.

The Niagara Falls Public Library offers online e-books, audiobooks, magazines, and videos. The library also has online learning resources like tech tips, legal resources, and local attractions. Most importantly, the Niagara Falls Public Library holds around 83,000 books.

In the 2005 budget of the Niagara Falls, The Niagara Falls Public Library was written to get about 2 million dollars to fund to stay open and provide the necessary expenses to allow the library to do what it needed to do for the community. Throughout the year, other amounts were placed to be given to the libraries to keep it open for the year and to be supported by Niagara Falls. The Niagara Falls Public Library continued to be written off in amounts due to them in further upcoming years.

== See also ==
- Carnegie Library (Niagara Falls, New York)
