= Blessed Sacrament Church (Buffalo, New York) =

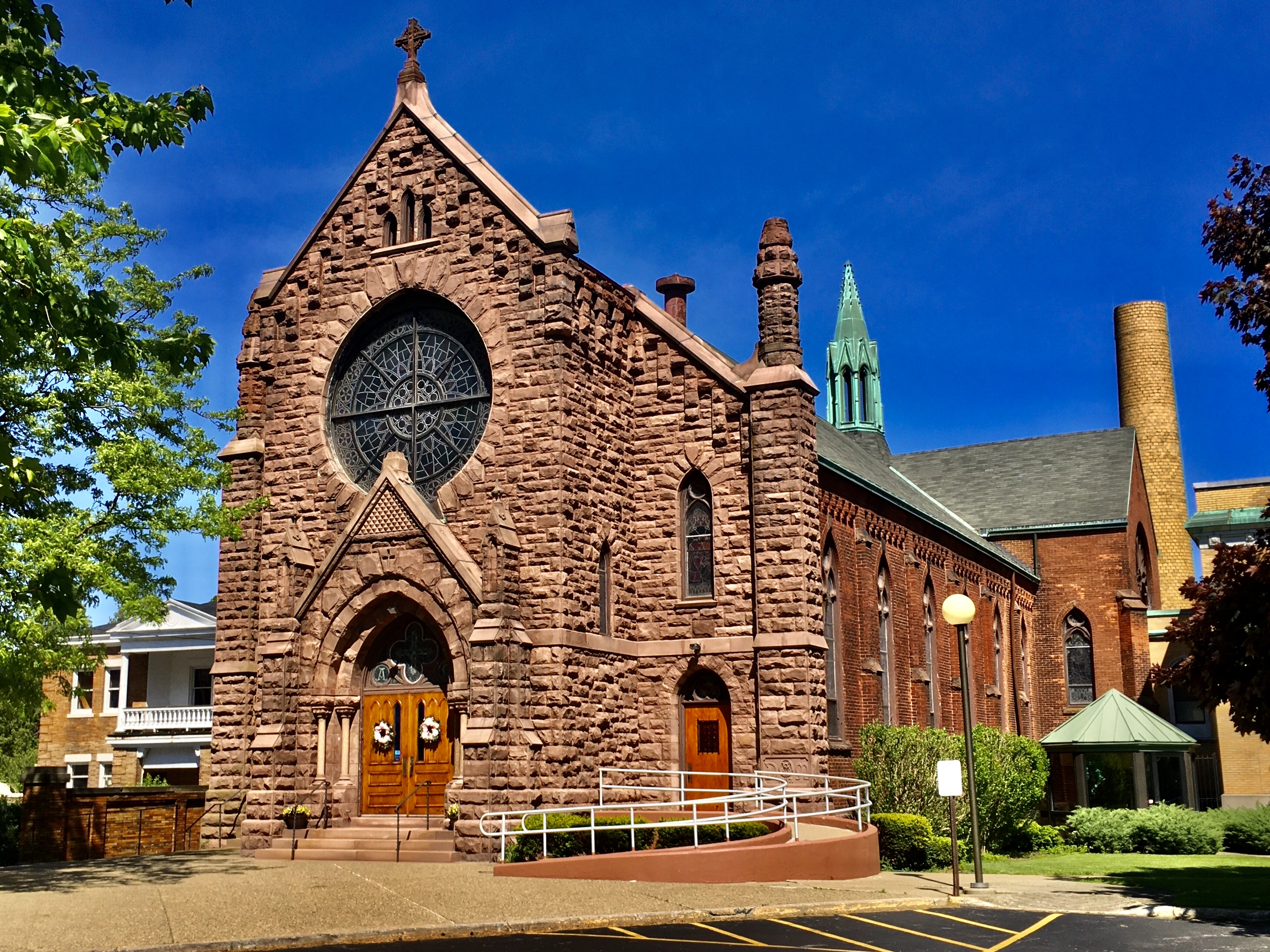
- Front of Church
- Blessed Sacrament Church
- 42°54′44.03″N 78°52′8.4″W
- Location: 1025 Delaware Avenue; Buffalo, New York 14209
- Country: United States
- Denomination: Roman Catholic
- Website: Blessed Sacrament Church

History
- Status: Parish Church
- Dedicated: May 26, 1889

Architecture
- Functional status: Active
- Architect(s): Adolphus Druiding; Albert A. Post
- Style: Gothic
- Years built: 1887-89
- Groundbreaking: Spring 1887

Specifications
- Capacity: 376
- Length: 138 feet (42 m)
- Width: 45 feet (14 m)
- Materials: Medina sandstone, red brick

Blessed Sacrament Church is a historic Roman Catholic church in Buffalo, New York, United States. Constructed in the late 19th century, it remains the home of an active congregation and has been recognized as a historically significant building in the Linwood Historic District of Buffalo.

== Early history ==
Blessed Sacrament Church boasts a unique and storied history that began in the spring of 1887 with workers constructing the first foundation of this Gothic style building at 1025 Delaware Avenue in Buffalo, New York. The original structure was designed by architect Adolphus Druiding, of Chicago, Illinois. It was erected immediately southeast of Bishop Stephen V. Ryan's new residence on the same parcel, also designed by Druiding. The two buildings were erected at a cost of $75,000 (USD), equivalent to $2,687,500 in 2025.

Though commonly referred to as the "Bishop's Chapel," the primary intent of this new worship space was to serve as a “‘chapel of ease’… for the convenience of Catholic worshipers in the vicinity” of Buffalo’s Cold Springs neighborhood, who otherwise had to travel several miles to attend Mass at other Catholic churches in the city.

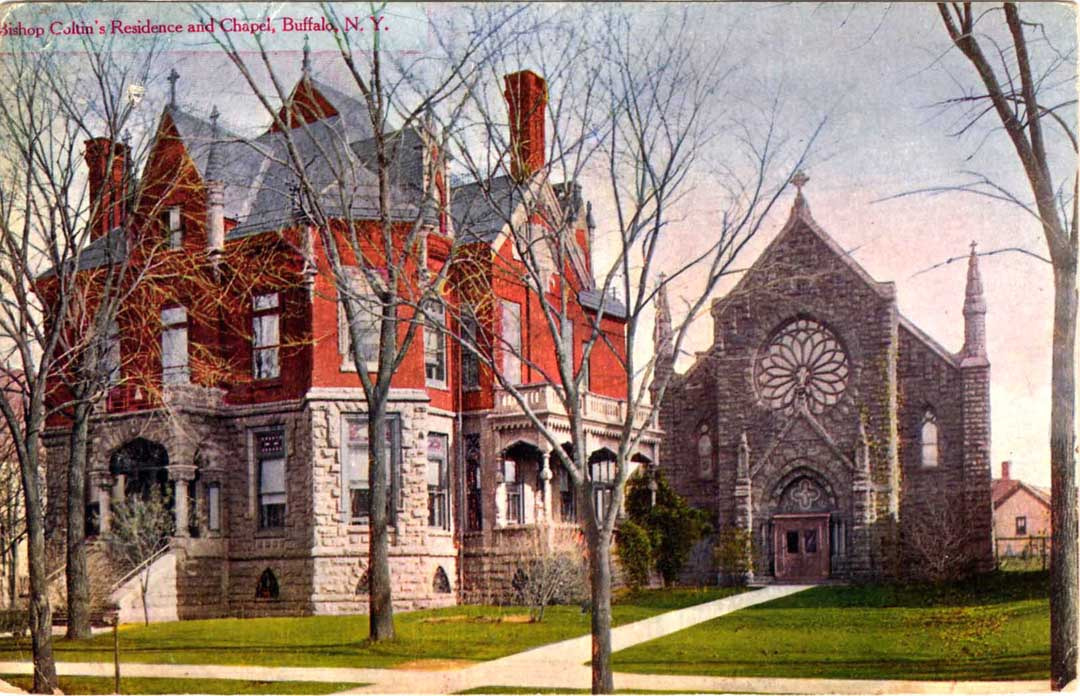
Bishop's Residence and Blessed Sacrament Chapel, Buffalo, NY, as they existed before the 1907-08 expansion of the Chapel.

On October 2, 1887, the cornerstone of what was to be called the "Chapel of the Blessed Sacrament," was laid in a grand ceremony attended by several thousand Catholics. Accompanied by Bishop Ryan, the group marched more than two miles from St. Joseph’s Cathedral at 50 Franklin Street to the Chapel site at 1025 Delaware Avenue. There, Bishop Ryan made remarks and announced that Rev. James F. McGloin would serve as the Chapel’s first Rector upon its opening—a position Rev. McGloin would hold for 30 years.

When Blessed Sacrament Chapel opened on May 26, 1889, it had a seating capacity of 288, which was sufficient to cover the roughly 50 families in residence over a territory of two square miles from North Street to the Park and from Richmond to Michigan Avenues. Among the distinguished visitors who said Mass in the Chapel was Cardinal Francesco Satolli, the first Apostolic delegate to the United States; Cardinal John Murphy Farley, Archbishop of New York; Cardinal Michael Logue, Archbishop of Armagh and Primate of Ireland; Cardinal Vincenzo Vannutelli, Dean of the College of Cardinals; Apostolic Delegates; and a host of Catholic bishops from around the world.

One of Blessed Sacrament Chapel’s most prominent early members was businessman Frederick C.M. Lautz. Lautz was regarded as one of Buffalo's wealthiest residents and is credited with starting the Buffalo Symphony Orchestra, the precursor of the Buffalo Philharmonic Orchestra. He also served on the Board of Directors for the Pan-American Exposition, which took place in Buffalo in 1901, chairing the Exposition’s music committee. Lautz was a renowned baritone vocalist who sang during services at Blessed Sacrament Chapel for nearly 15 years. In this capacity, he sang both solo and as part of a quartet along with "Miss Annie Lee, Miss Louise Masses, [and] Mrs. William Brennan."

In 1906, Rev. McGloin installed in Blessed Sacrament Chapel an altar consecrated in 590 A.D. by Pope Gregory I. McGloin acquired the altar from the small church of San Salvatore in Thermis in Rome when that church and its adjoining complex were demolished in the early 20th Century. It was placed in the north transept of the Chapel, where it remained for 70 years. A tablet on the wall adjacent to the altar read:

This altar is from San Salvatore in Thermis, an ancient church of Rome, consecrated by Pope Gregory the Great about 590 A.D. It contains the box of relics of which St. Gregory placed in the altar when he consecrated the church. In 1906, the altar was obtained from the ecclesiastical authorities at Rome for the Blessed Sacrament Church, Buffalo, by Rev. James F. McGloin, rector.

Another tablet adjacent to the altar listed the names of "35 women of the parish who defrayed the cost of transporting the altar from Rome and installing it in the chapel."

In 1907 and 1908, the Diocese of Buffalo worked with renowned ecclesiastic architect Albert A. Post on an enlargement of Blessed Sacrament Chapel, accompanied by extensive interior alterations and improvements (Druiding was unavailable to support this effort, as he died in 1899). Two doors were added to the front elevation, one under each of the two front-facing stained glass windows that flank the center rose window. The edifice was split in two and the apse and sacristy were moved back 45 feet, with the intervening space filled in with a transept, giving the Chapel its distinct cruciform shape in keeping with the building’s Gothic style of architecture. A copper cupola was also incorporated at the intersection of the nave and transept, topped with a Latin cross. The north and south transept walls each feature a large rose window of similar size to the rose window on the front elevation of the building facing Delaware Avenue. Reportedly, the original rose window at the front of the Chapel was relocated during this renovation to one of the transept walls.

Interior improvements during this renovation included the installation of "marble mosaic" terrazzo aisleways and a carpeted altar, which was funded by the Blessed Sacrament "Altar Society, which consists of the women of the parish." According to one report at the time, "So skillfully was the work of moving back the sanctuary and sacristy effected that the mural decorations of the former were unharmed. This color scheme of the sanctuary—rich tones in redish (sic) browns with gold and silver leaf—will be carried out in the decoration of the nave and transept."

On April 4, 1908, Blessed Sacrament Chapel was dedicated anew by then-Bishop Charles H. Colton and officially earned the designation of "church," and thus, Rev. McGloin's title changed from rector to pastor, and he was now formally responsible for Blessed Sacrament Parish. This re-dedication service was very widely attended by Blessed Sacrament's regular parishioners, who filled out the new 600-seat capacity of the sanctuary, along with a number of guests, including Monsignor Nelson H. Baker who is well known in Buffalo for his works of charity.

In 1911, Bishop Colton directed the construction of a new, grand Gothic style cathedral designed by Roman architect Aristide Leonori at the northeast corner of Delaware Avenue and West Utica Street in Buffalo, New York. Plans for the cathedral encompassed the land atop which Blessed Sacrament Church and the Bishop’s residence stood. With its established and devoted congregation, razing Blessed Sacrament Church to make way for the new cathedral was not an option, and so the Bishop directed that the entire structure and his residence be relocated to new foundations on the adjacent parcel at 1035 Delaware Avenue, which the Diocese had acquired two years prior. The church and residence were moved to the northeast 300 feet and 200 feet, respectively, by the Gus Britt Company of Buffalo.

Also in 1911, Mosier & Summers, a Buffalo-based construction firm, began constructing the "New St. Joseph's Cathedral" at the northeast corner of West Utica Street and Delaware Avenue. Part of this effort included the erection of a utilitarian single-story boiler building immediately south of Blessed Sacrament Church. The ground floor of this building served as the sacristy for the Cathedral, while its cavernous basement housed the Cathedral's boilers. The building was connected to both Blessed Sacrament Church and the New St. Joseph’s Cathedral via building hyphens. A boiler smokestack was also built to the northeast of the boiler building, tucked in the corner adjacent to Blessed Sacrament Church’s apse and south transept.

The new Cathedral opened in 1915, at which time Blessed Sacrament Parish became "New Cathedral Parish," and Blessed Sacrament Church again became a chapel.

In 1921, the Diocese of Buffalo purchased the former Mansion of Seymour H. Knox I at 1045 Delaware Avenue to serve as the residence of then-Bishop William Turner and changed its address to 1035 Delaware Avenue, such that the Bishop's residence retained the same house number. The Bishop’s previous residence, immediately south, was subsequently demolished, explaining why Blessed Sacrament is set back farther than any other primary building along Delaware Avenue in Buffalo.

In 1976, then-Bishop Edward D. Head ordered the demolition of the New St. Joseph’s Cathedral, on the basis that the building allegedly suffered from irreparable structural defects, to make way for the Brutalist style Timon Towers apartment complex, leaving only the boiler building and associated smokestack in place. At this time, New Cathedral Parish reverted to its origins as Blessed Sacrament Parish, and the 1887 Gothic style building was once again designated a "Church." Presumably to help reduce demolition costs, the Diocese of Buffalo “gifted” the decommissioned boiler building and associated smokestack to Blessed Sacrament Church. The Church uses the ground floor of the building as its sacristy, which offers a much larger footprint than the original Druiding-designed sacristy room, located off of the Church’s apse.

In 1981, the sanctuary of Blessed Sacrament Church was remodeled to bring it into conformity with the new liturgical directives of the Second Vatican Council. These renovations extended the altar forward to encompass the full extent of the transept, along with the installation of a “modern” silver light bar above the altar. At this time, the ancient altar from the Church of San Salvatore that had been consecrated by Pope Gregory the Great was removed.

In 1993, the exterior of Blessed Sacrament Church was repointed with historically appropriate mortar—a project funded in part with a $35,000 grant from the New York Landmarks Conservancy. Also around this time, the Church’s slate roof was replaced with a three-tab asphalt shingle roof.

In the late 1990s, the interior of the Church was again renovated to include the removal of the silver light ring over the altar and the replacement of the kneelers. A new altar, tabernacle table, and ambo were built to reflect the detailing of the pews and organ loft.

== Current structure ==
Today, Blessed Sacrament Church can accommodate 376 worshipers throughout its 5,780 square foot worship space on the ground floor. Its basement measures 5,440 square feet.

The front entrance of the Church faces onto a loop driveway and is set back significantly from Delaware Avenue. When approaching the main entry, the eyes are drawn immediately to the large rose window dominating the rough-cut, large-scale Medina sandstone façade, whose stained glass presents a floral motif, and then down to the entrance, crowned with compound arches, flanked by Gothic-style granite columns with foliated Medina sandstone capitals, and with a quatrefoil pattern and alpha and omega symbolism in the tympanum. The parapet gable above is pierced by a trio of small lancet windows, crowned by a Celtic cross, and flanked by stout finial-topped pinnacles that were once themselves capped with crosses. The main entry was fitted with a ramp in the 1990s to ensure barrier-free access.

All other exterior walls are composed primarily of red brick with articulated detailing, and the foundation is rough stone topped with a Medina sandstone belt course. Each brick buttress is accented with Medina sandstone, and all glazed openings are finished with stained glass windows.

The cornerstone of Blessed Sacrament Church is made of Medina sandstone and features the “1887” date marked under the bas-relief initials, “DOM,” representing the ancient acclimation, Deo Optimo Maximo, meaning, “To God, the Greatest and Best.” Within the “O” is an image of a pelican feeding its young, symbolizing the Eucharist.

The Church’s slate roof was replaced in the 1990s with three-tab asphalt shingles. A Gothic cupola, all rain gutters, and most downspouts and flashing are composed of copper that has patinated with age. A copper Latin cross that once topped the cupola is now missing. Also missing today are the tops of the stone parapets and crosses on the north and south transept walls, as well as the crosses and several courses of Medina sandstone blocks that once topped the two pinnacles integrated into the western main elevation of the building.

The interior of the Church features a ribbed vault ceiling of plaster that is in excellent condition. At the rear of the nave, at the mezzanine level, is an organ loft that houses the Church’s organ pipes. The front of the loft features natural wood paneling with original detailing to match the Church’s wooden pews.

The narthex has resilient flooring, stained wood wainscot, and plaster walls above. The sanctuary has carpeted aisleways (atop green terrazzo) and a carpeted altar, stained wood wainscot, and plaster walls above. The ceiling is made up of a series of groin vaults supported on the exterior walls and two lines of internal columns. A passageway into the sacristy building extends from the south transept.

A stair within the narthex leads up to an organ loft above the narthex and the rear of the sanctuary. The organ housed within this space was reportedly formerly located within a side chapel of the New St. Joseph’s Cathedral and was relocated here at the time of the Cathedral’s demolition.

The attic of the Church is a large open space extending over the entire building, defined by large timber structural support framing throughout.

Access to the basement is primarily via a tight winding stair at the north side of the narthex. The basement (known as Marian Hall) houses a large meeting room below the sanctuary and a smaller room below the altar. An office, storage space, commercial style kitchen, and restrooms are located at the rear. A mechanical room is located at the north side of the basement, housing three boilers that provide the primary heat for the building as well as a forced-air furnace that provides supplemental heat to the basement. A passageway into the basement of the Sacristy Building extends from below the south transept.

The basement features a suspended ceiling throughout, with ceiling heights of around 7 feet. The floor beneath the main worship space has been furred up from the existing concrete slab using dimensional lumber with a layer of plywood sheathing. This portion of the space is carpeted. Elsewhere, the floor consists of painted concrete that has been worn through. A commercial-style kitchen was added to serve large gatherings. Equally spaced throughout this area are 18, 8-inch-diameter steel columns sitting on 12-inch square bases.

An exterior entry to the basement also exists at the south side of the Church, a glass pavilion constructed in 1991 that includes a staircase and wheelchair lift. Finally, the basement also has an emergency exit from its north side, housed within a small gable-roofed addition that appears to have been constructed in the 1980s.

=== Stained Glass Windows ===
The Church features 31 stained glass windows total; 29 in the Munich style, one in the Tudor-style, and two contemporary windows crafted in the 1980s by local artists and glassmakers.

The Munich style is represented in the windows in the nave, transept, and apse of the Church. Each was produced by the Tyrol Art Glass Company of Innsbruck, Austria. Windows produced in the Munich style use large, painted glass panels, versus the medieval technique which uses smaller pieces of colored glass. This style was developed in Munich, Germany, in the early 19th Century and uses an abundance of landscaping and flowers, representing nature as the source of spiritual experience. Each window is a work of art, bright and rich in color, depicting an inspirational parable from the Scriptures and the Church.

The theme of Blessed Sacrament Church’s windows reflects the founding community’s faith in, and devotion to, the Real Presence of Christ in the Eucharist: The Blessed Sacrament.

Two of three original large rose windows of the Church remain intact, one in the north transept and the other in the south transept. After decades of weather exposure, the western rose window, above the Church’s main entrance, sustained irreparable damage and was replaced in 1984 with one designed by Images in Glass, Inc., of Hamburg, New York.

== Associated buildings ==
=== Sacristy Building ===
Adjoined to Blessed Sacrament Church, at the southernmost wall of its transept, is the only remaining building from the New St. Joseph’s Cathedral (demolished in 1976). It housed the Cathedral’s sacristy on the main floor and its boiler plant in a cavernous basement. The Sacristy Building is a 3,000 square foot single-story. The main floor was once connected to the Cathedral via an enclosed, 15-foot-wide hyphen. The building functions as the sacristy and hospitality space for Blessed Sacrament Church. The architectural style combines both Gothic and Beaux Arts design features and detailing. The building does not reflect the color or design of the Cathedral.

=== Rectory ===
The Rectory of Blessed Sacrament Church is located at 1035 Delaware Avenue in the Beaux Arts style former Knox Mansion that Blessed Sacrament Parish purchased, along with its companion carriage house, in 1998 for $300,000, equivalent to $592,589 in 2025. The Rectory houses Parish offices and a priest residence.

== Recent history ==
Blessed Sacrament Church remains an active parish of the Diocese of Buffalo.
