= Knox Mansion (Buffalo, New York) =

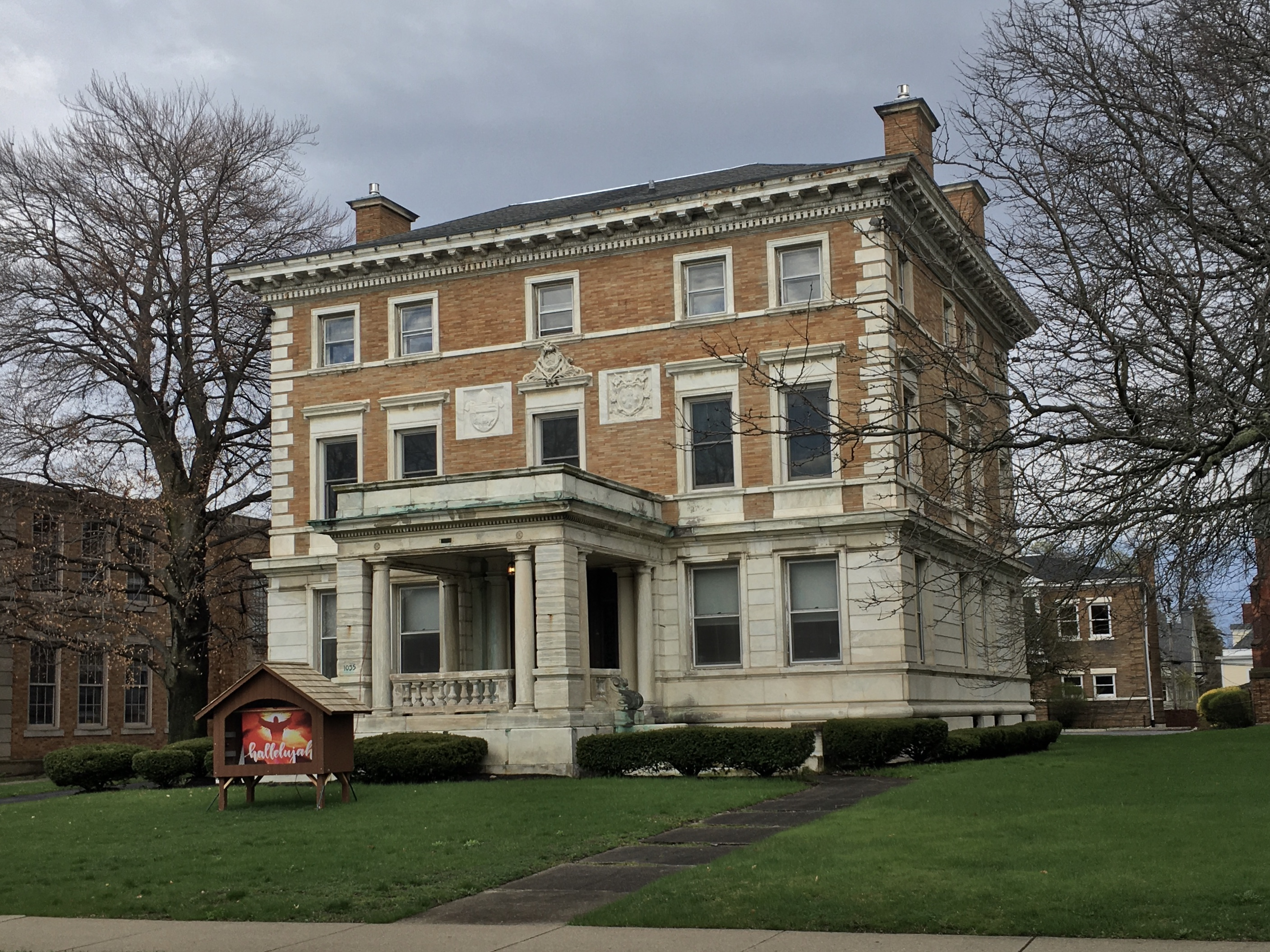
- (2020)
- Interactive map of the Knox Mansion area

General information
- Architectural style: Beaux Arts
- Location: 1035 Delaware Avenue; Buffalo, New York 14209
- Coordinates: 42°54′44.964″N 78°52′9.3″W
- Completed: 1904
- Owner: Blessed Sacrament Church

Design and construction
- Architect: Edgar E. Joralemon

The Knox Mansion is a historic residence of the Seymour H. Knox I family at 1035 Delaware Avenue in Buffalo, New York. Knox resided in the home from 1904 until his death on May 16, 1915, at age 54.

== History ==
In 1903 and 1904, prominent Buffalo businessman Seymour H. Knox I had a new 13,700 square foot Beaux Arts style mansion and carriage house constructed at 1045 Delaware Avenue. Mr. Knox commissioned celebrated architect Edgar E. Joralemon to design the three-story residence, which features 27 rooms and 11 fireplaces. According to The New York Times, Knox's "Delaware Avenue home is one of the finest in the country." Knox lived in the house with his spouse, Grace Millard Knox, and three children: Dorothy Virginia Knox (Rogers-Goodyear), Seymour H. Knox II, and Marjorie Knox (Klopp). On May 16, 1915, Knox died at age 54 inside the residence, succumbing to uremia, a kidney disease. On May 18, 1915, his funeral was held in the Knox residence.

That same year, his spouse, Grace (née Millard), purchased property on Delaware Avenue north of Summer Street in Buffalo. Grace hired New York City architect Charles P.H. Gilbert to replace an older house that stood on the property with a grand new residence. The resulting structure was a stone mansion built over the course of three years that was completed in 1918, which is today known as the Grace Millard Knox House.

In 1921, the Diocese of Buffalo purchased the Seymour H. Knox I estate at 1045 Delaware Avenue to serve as the residence of then-Bishop William Turner and changed its address to 1035 Delaware Avenue, such that the Bishop's residence retained the same house number. The Bishop's previous residence, immediately south, was subsequently demolished, explaining why Blessed Sacrament Church is set back farther than any other primary building along Delaware Avenue in Buffalo.

In 1953, the Diocese of Buffalo purchased a new residence for the Bishop at 77 Oakland Place and transferred custody of the former Knox estate to New Cathedral Parish for use as a convent for the Sisters of St. Joseph. After this transition, the second and third floors were renovated to support convent operations.

In 1981, the Sisters of St. Joseph moved out of the former Knox residence at 1035 Delaware Avenue, and Blessed Sacrament Parish sold the property to Richard E. Gilbert to house Gilbert's investment company. In 1983, it was sold to Lawrence H. Singer and became the headquarters of his company, Singer Advertising & Marketing. In the years ahead, Singer invested more than $250,000 into the property to restore the second and third floors to their original configuration, selectively added overhead lighting to support office functions, installed air conditioning, and replaced plumbing throughout the main residence.

== Current Structure ==
=== Main Residence ===
Both the main residence and carriage house were designed by architect Edgar E. Joralemon and constructed between 1903 and 1904. The Rectory is 13,700 square feet in size and consists of a full basement and three stories above grade. It is composed of triple wythe exterior walls of Roman brick with a continuous white marble water table and trim, including window and door headers.

A large marble portico announces the front entrance of the building on Delaware Avenue, while a marble porte-cochere on its north face provides covered access to the main side door.

For the main body of the house, the wall cladding at the raised basement and first floor levels is marble, whereas the second and third floors and the rear of the house are clad with yellow Roman brick, but all window trim and belt courses are the same white marble as below.

The windows are original or old wood sash with aluminum storm windows, with the exception of the windows at the front half of the second floor which appear to be recent replacements. The doors are original or very old wood assemblies. The third floor is crowned with an entablature featuring a projecting cornice decorated with a parade of lion heads above ornamented modillions with acanthus leaves that alternate with rosettes, as well as egg-and-dart and dentil molding. The base banding appears to be wood, whereas all other components are clearly painted tin.

The rear portion of the house is only two stories tall and is clad with yellow Roman brick from grade with marble trim. This portion is crowned with a simpler wood cornice. The rear of the house also features a two-level porch. At the first floor the porch is half the width of the elevation, and at the second floor it is the full width. The second-floor porch was extensively rebuilt in the fall of 2020 due to rotted wood columns, balustrades, and box beams.

The house has a hipped asphalt shingle roof. Five yellow Roman brick chimneys rise from the perimeter of the roof, four on the main roof and one on the rear section.

Original interior walls of the Rectory consist of plaster on wood framing with some infill walls later added. A main grand stair and a servants’ back stair provide access to all floors.

The main floor of the Rectory functions such as kitchen, dining, and Parish offices. This floor has been maintained in its original materials, details, and finishes with the exception of a modernization of the original kitchen that was tastefully done. The original north and south parlor rooms serve as the Pastor's office and general meeting room, respectively. The original main residential entry from Delaware Avenue remains intact and functional, but is not in use. Like the first floor, the second and third floors of the Rectory remain largely intact as originally constructed.

=== Carriage House ===
The carriage house is about 7,200 square feet and has a partial basement and two stories above grade. This building was designed to resemble the Beaux-Arts style of the associated main residence, but with simpler detailing befitting its use. It features a horse stable and carriage room on the first floor, and living quarters on the second floor.

The exterior walls are yellow Roman brick with marble trim similar to the main residence and the foundation walls are rough stone with black chert inclusions.

The exterior walls are composed of multi-wythe brick with a continuous marble water table. The roof overhang, including fascia, cornice, gutter, and soffit ornamentation, are composed of painted tin. With minor exception, the original wood double-hung windows are still in place and functional. The original standing seam metal roof was replaced with architectural asphalt shingles.

A large sliding stained wood carriage door provides access to the first floor interior. A second set of carriage doors originally existed leading into the former horse stable area, but were replaced in the late-1990s with a roll-up garage door. The original wood sliding hay loft access door remains above this contemporary garage door. The windows throughout the building are the original double-hung wood sash. All the exterior woodwork was repainted in December 2020 and some elements, such as the second floor hayloft door, were repaired. A covered porch with balustrade is located at the center of the second floor front elevation above the main carriage door.

A brick wall extends north from the northwest corner of the first floor and once continued on with an iron gate that met another section of brick wall, thus enclosing a courtyard that was originally a paddock for the Knox's horses. A one-story “manure pit” room originally extended from the north side of the building, topped with a tin roof. This room was removed no less than 40 years ago when a grotto was incorporated into the north side of the Carriage House. A yellow Roman brick chimney-like manure vent incorporated into the northeast corner of the building remains in place.

The ground floor of the carriage house is at grade and divided into four main areas that reflect their original use. They include an office, carriage room, horse bathing area, and stable area. The office is accessible from the front vestibule and through a door leading to the carriage room. The floor is concrete with yellow brick walls. The carriage room has a concrete floor with the basement below. The interior walls are a yellow brick with all bullnose outside corners. Openings between spaces use truncated arches. The ceiling is finished with a highly detailed natural finished wood coffer system, complete with matching perimeter crown molding. Windows are trimmed out with matching wood and finish. The horse bathing area is slab-on-grade, sloped to a large floor drain. The horse stable area is brick-on-grade and sloped to French drains. Although the stall walls were removed to accommodate motor vehicle parking, the footprints of the former concrete stall walls remain readily visible. The highlight of the stable is a large central light-well leading up to a large skylight.

The west and east sides of the second floor of the Carriage House were originally laid out to accommodate the communal quarters for a gardener, housekeeper, and coachman. This area consists of a kitchen, one full bathroom, a parlor, dining room, and three bedrooms. The center of the main body of the Carriage House once served as a storage area for carriages, which were brought to the second level via a carriage elevator. The easternmost portion of the second floor was a hayloft.
