= Northport Public Library =

- U.S. National Register of Historic Places
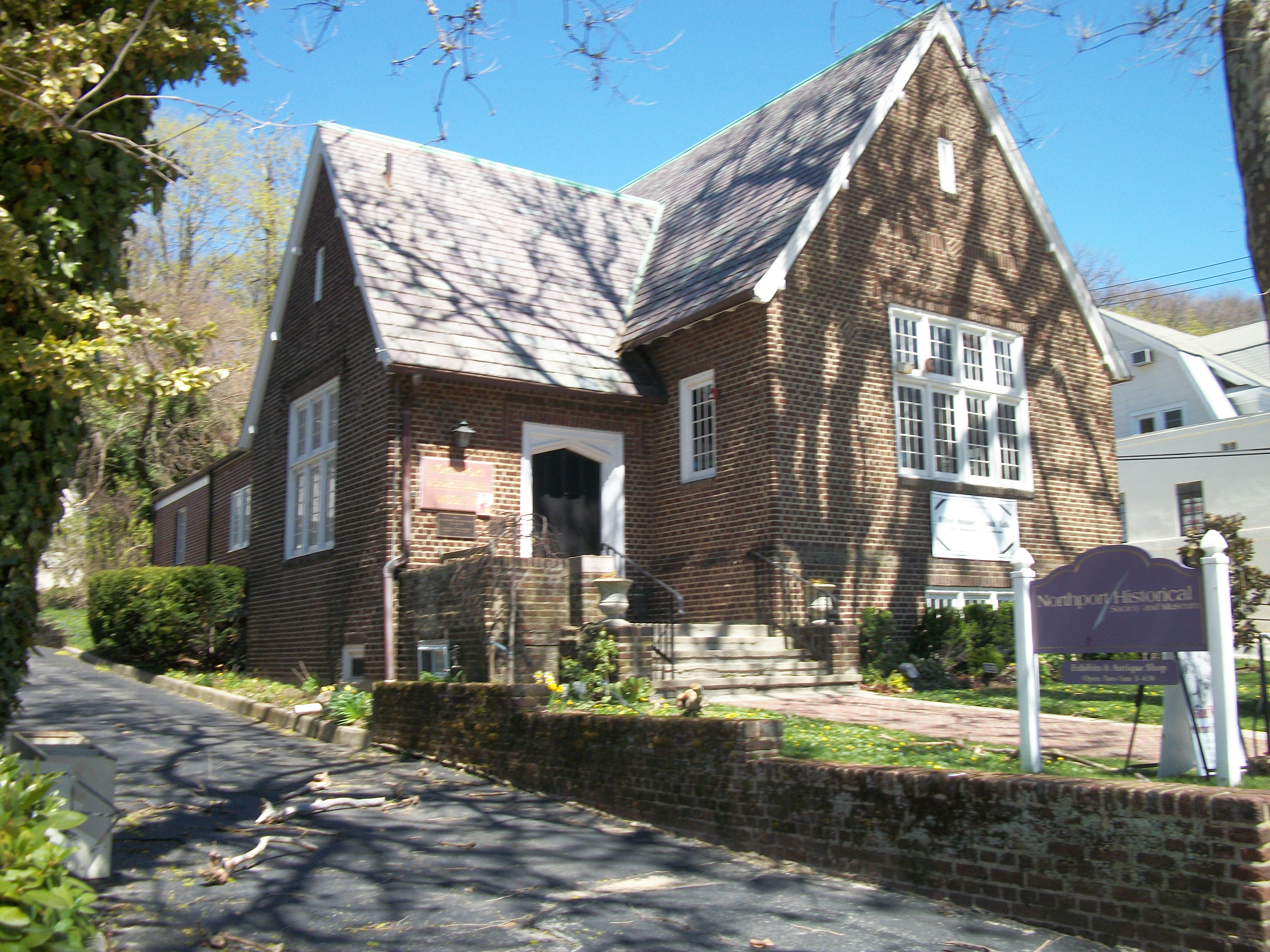
- The historic Northport Public Library, now a local history museum.

- Location within New York Location within the United States
- Location: 215 Main St., Northport, New York
- Coordinates: 40°54′5″N 73°20′38″W
- Area: less than one acre
- Built: 1914
- Architect: Donnell, Harry E.; Vail & Call
- Architectural style: Jacobethan
- NRHP reference No.: 96001429
- Added to NRHP: December 6, 1996

Northport Public Library is a historic library building located at Northport in Suffolk County, New York. It was designed and built in 1914, with funds provided by the philanthropist Andrew Carnegie. It is one of 3,000 such libraries constructed between 1885 and 1919, and one of 107 in New York State. Carnegie provided $10,000 toward the construction of the Northport library. It is a small masonry structure in the Jacobethan Revival style. It consists of a primary gable front section housing the stacks and reading room, and a secondary side gable wing containing the entrance vestibule and staircase. It features a slate roof and barrel vaulted reading room. It was expanded in 1958.

The building functioned as a library until 1967; in 1974 it became home to the Northport Historical Society Museum. It was added to the National Register of Historic Places in 1996.
