= Canastota Public Library =

- U.S. National Register of Historic Places
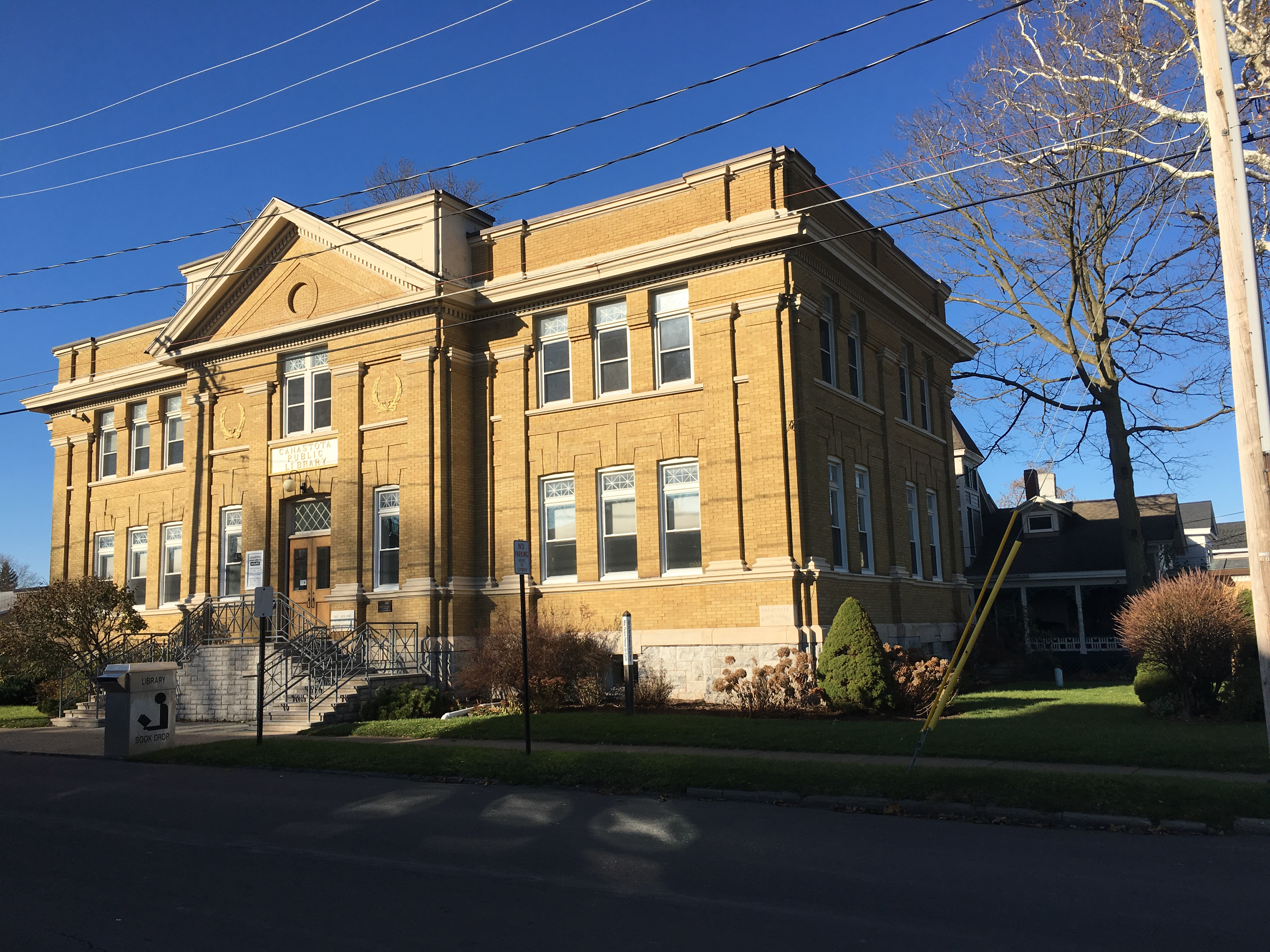

- Location within New York Location within the United States
- Location: 102 W. Center St., Canastota, New York
- Coordinates: 43°4′42″N 75°45′20″W
- Area: less than one acre
- Built: 1902
- Architect: Russell, Archimedes; Funda & Del Monico Bros.
- Architectural style: Classical Revival
- MPS: Canastota Village MRA
- NRHP reference No.: 86001294
- Added to NRHP: May 23, 1986

Canastota Public Library is a historic Carnegie library building located at Canastota in Madison County, New York. It was designed and built in 1902, with funds provided by the philanthropist Andrew Carnegie. It is one of 2,509 such libraries constructed between 1885 and 1919, and one of 107 in New York State. Carnegie provided $10,000 toward the construction of the Canastota library. It is a two-story building on a raised, rusticated stone and brick foundation in the Classical Revival style.

It was added to the National Register of Historic Places in 1986.
