= Edgar Eugene Joralemon =

American architect

Edgar Eugene Joralemon (1858–1937) was an architect in the U.S. The Drum Hill High School and Dunkirk School Number 7 are among the buildings he designed that are listed on the National Register of Historic Places.

He worked in Minnesota and then Upstate New York.

He replaced Harvey Ellis as Leroy S. Buffington's chief draftsman. Joralemon partnered with Fremont D. Orff from 1893 until 1897.

== Work ==
- William W. And Louise McNair House (1886), a mansion in Minneapolis razed in 1961
- Henry E Holmes House (1887) in Minneapolis
- George W. and Nancy B. Van Dusen House (1893) at 1900 LaSalle Avenue in Minneapolis
- North Tonawanda Carnegie Library (1903) at 240 Goundry Street in North Tonawanda, New York
- Niagara Falls Public Library (1904 Carnegie Building) at 1022 Main Street in Niagara Falls, New York
- Drum Hill High School (1909) on Ringgold Streer in Peekskill, New York
- Depew High School (1914) in Depew, New York
- Dunkirk School Number 7 (1921) at East Lake Shore Drive and North Serval Street in Dunkirk
- Roswell P. Flower Memorial Library at 229 Washington Street in Watertown, New York (Orchard, Lansing & Joralemon)
- Olean School No. 10, now Ivers J. Norton Elementary School
- Knox Mansion (Buffalo, New York) (1904)
