= Carnegie Library (Niagara Falls, New York) =

- Niagara Falls Public Library
- U.S. National Register of Historic Places
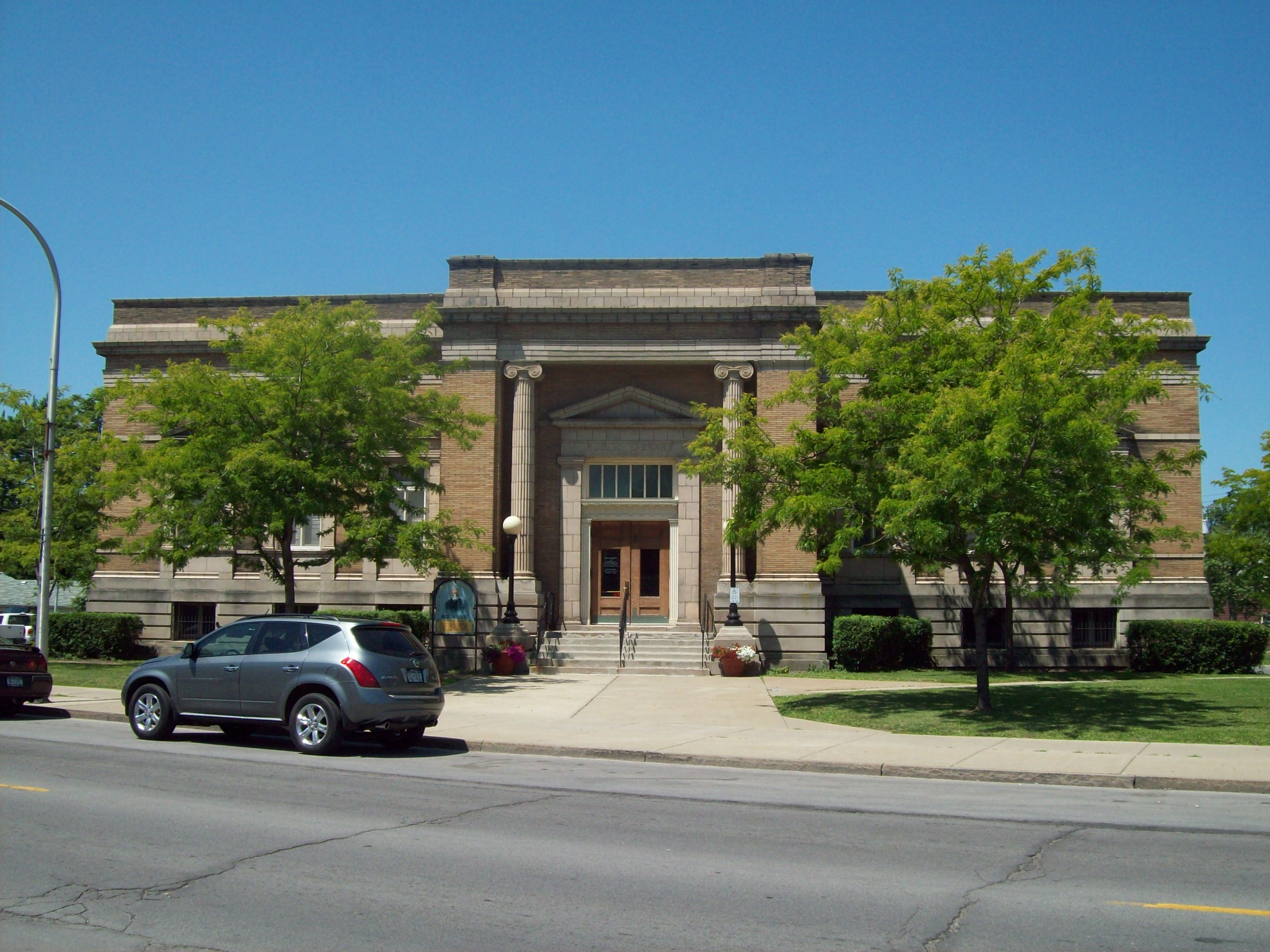
- Former Niagara Falls Public Library, June 2009

- Location within New York Location within the United States
- Location: 1022 Main St., Niagara Falls, New York
- Coordinates: 43.0987165°N 79.053916°W
- Built: 1902–1904
- Architect: Joralemon, E.E.; Long, George B.
- NRHP reference No.: 74001282
- Added to NRHP: June 05, 1974

Niagara Falls Public Library, also known as the Carnegie Library in order to distinguish it from the new Earl W. Brydges Library, is a historic public library building located at Niagara Falls in Niagara County, New York.

== History ==
It was designed and built in 1902–1904, with funds provided by the philanthropist Andrew Carnegie. It is one of 2,500 such libraries constructed between 1883 and 1929, and one of 107 in New York State. The structure cost $50,000 to build and opened in April 1904. It is a low one-story brick structure. The interior features elaborate plaster moldings and trim, marble steps, and pale skylights. The building functioned as a library until March 9, 1974, when the library's collections outgrew the small building and were moved to the new Earl W. Brydges Building at 1425 Main Street, and is now occupied by the offices of Niagara Falls Urban Renewal Agency, along with other city departments.

It was listed on the National Register of Historic Places in 1974.
