= Jonathan Lucroy =

American baseball player (born 1986)

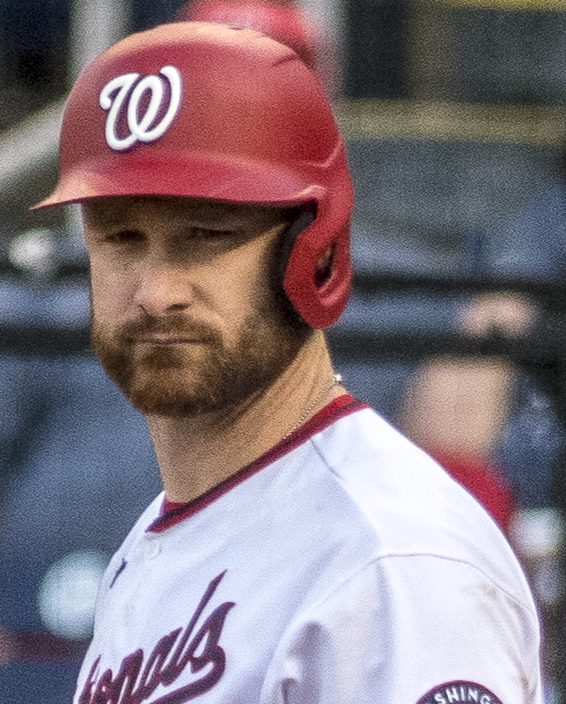
- Lucroy with the Nationals in 2021
- Catcher
- Born: June 13, 1986 (age 40); Eustis, Florida, U.S.
- Batted: Right Threw: Right

MLB debut
- May 21, 2010, for the Milwaukee Brewers

Last MLB appearance
- July 10, 2021, for the Atlanta Braves

MLB statistics
- Batting average: .274
- Home runs: 108
- Runs batted in: 548
- Stats at Baseball Reference

Teams
- Milwaukee Brewers (2010–2016); Texas Rangers (2016–2017); Colorado Rockies (2017); Oakland Athletics (2018); Los Angeles Angels (2019); Chicago Cubs (2019); Boston Red Sox (2020); Washington Nationals (2021); Atlanta Braves (2021)

Career highlights and awards
- 2× All-Star (2014, 2016); Milwaukee Brewers Wall of Honor
Medals
Men's baseball
Representing United States
World Baseball Classic
Gold medal – first place	2017 Los Angeles	Team

Jonathan Charles Lucroy (born June 13, 1986) is an American former professional baseball catcher. Between 2010 and 2021, he spent 12 seasons in Major League Baseball (MLB) playing for the Milwaukee Brewers, Texas Rangers, Colorado Rockies, Oakland Athletics, Los Angeles Angels, Chicago Cubs, Boston Red Sox, Washington Nationals, and Atlanta Braves.

Born in Eustis, Florida, Lucroy began catching for his Little League Baseball team before attending Umatilla High School, where he set a school record with 22 career home runs. After high school, Lucroy played college baseball for the Louisiana Ragin' Cajuns, serving as the team's starting catcher beginning during his sophomore season. In three seasons with Louisiana, Lucroy set a school record with 182 career runs batted in (RBI), 414 total bases, and 54 doubles. He also spent two seasons playing collegiate summer baseball with the Sanford River Rats and Winter Park Diamond Dawgs of the Florida Collegiate Summer League. Lucroy left the Cajuns after three seasons when he was taken by the Brewers in the third round of the 2007 MLB draft.

Lucroy had a quick rise through the Brewers' farm system, making his major league debut in 2010 after an injury to Gregg Zaun. He was supposed to return to the minor leagues shortly after this debut, but the severity of Zaun's injury forced the Brewers to keep Lucroy in Milwaukee for the remainder of the year, and he soon usurped George Kottaras as the Brewers' starting catcher. With the Brewers, Lucroy was a two-time MLB All-Star, and he became the face of the franchise after Ryan Braun was implicated in the Biogenesis scandal. By 2016, however, Lucroy began looking for a trade, and after an unsuccessful trade attempt by the Cleveland Indians due to Lucroy not waiving his no trade clause, he and Jeremy Jeffress were sent to the Rangers that July. While Lucroy's first season with Texas helped them capture the AL West title, and he won a gold medal at the 2017 World Baseball Classic during the offseason, Robinson Chirinos soon surpassed Lucroy as the Rangers' starting catcher in 2017, and he finished out the year with the Rockies.

After going unsigned during the usual free agency period, Lucroy joined the Athletics in March 2018, where his offensive difficulties were offset by his work with Oakland's pitching staff. When Lucroy and Oakland could not come to contractual terms for the 2019 season, he joined the Angels instead. Lucroy's tenure in Los Angeles was cut short by a concussion and broken nose in July, but he was able to finish the season with the Cubs, who had struggled to find a replacement for the injured Willson Contreras. Lucroy mostly missed the pandemic-shortened 2020 season, spending time at the Red Sox alternate training site, and had brief tenures with Washington and Atlanta when both teams were in need of a veteran catching presence.

== Early life ==
Lucroy was born on June 13, 1986, in Eustis, Florida. His father Steven worked as a greenskeeper for local golf courses, while his mother Karen stayed at home to take care of Lucroy and his two younger brothers, David and Matthew. He grew up supporting the Atlanta Braves of Major League Baseball (MLB), and one of his favorite players was Chipper Jones. Lucroy began catching around the age of 10, when he was playing Little League Baseball under a team coached by his father. He started in the position at the request of his father, as Lucroy was one of the only players unafraid of being hit by the ball, and he stayed there after developing a talent in the position.

Lucroy was an early standout at Umatilla High School, where he batted .310 with 10 doubles as a sophomore in 2002. He followed that performance by batting .500 with 10 home runs, nine doubles, and 35 runs batted in (RBI) as a junior, while committing only two errors behind the plate. He finished his high school baseball career with a .450 batting average and 10 home runs as a senior in 2004. In addition to holding the Umatilla record with 22 career home runs, Lucroy collected a number of honors throughout his career: he was an All-State honorable mention as a freshman, All-Area second team as a sophomore, and All-Area first team, All-State first team, and All-Central Florida second team as a junior. In 2011, Umatilla High School retired Lucroy's No. 6 jersey.

== College career ==
In November 2003, during senior year of high school, Lucroy committed to play college baseball for the Ragin' Cajuns of the University of Louisiana at Lafayette, beginning with their 2005 season. Lucroy was one of three catchers for the Cajuns during his freshman year, splitting time with seniors Adam Massiatte and Justin Morgan. Although preference was given to the two senior catchers, Lucroy was a strong enough hitter that his college coaches did not want him to stay on the bench, and so by April, he was promoted to the team's designated hitter. On April 18, 2005, Lucroy was named the Sun Belt Conference player of the week for picking up the 14th five-hit game in Louisiana–Lafayette history, against the rival New Orleans Privateers. Although he caught in only six games for the Cajuns, Lucroy's time as a designated hitter allowed him to bat .379 with five home runs and 48 RBI as a freshman, and he helped take the team to a 48–19 record and a Sun Belt Conference regular season championship. After the season, Lucroy was named to both the All-Sun Belt Conference Second Team and the Louisville Slugger Freshman All-American Team. After the regular season ended, Lucroy played collegiate summer baseball with the Sanford River Rats of the Florida Collegiate Summer League (FCSL), where his league-leading RBIs landed him a spot on the all-star team.

As the Cajuns' new starting catcher in 2006, Lucroy opened his sophomore season by kicking off a five-run comeback eighth inning for Louisiana–Lafayette with a bases-clearing double in their opening day 8–2 defeat of Louisiana–Monroe. Although the transition to full-time catching saw Lucroy's batting average drop to .243 through the end of March, he led Louisiana–Lafayette with four home runs in that same frame. He found his stride by the end of the season, finishing with a .333 average and a team-leading 12 home runs with 58 RBI. Although Louisiana–Lafayette lost both the regular season and Sun Belt Conference baseball tournament championship titles to Troy University, Lucroy was named to the All-Sun Belt Tournament team after recording 11 hits, including seven extra-base hits, and nine RBI in 17 tournament at bats. That summer, Lucroy returned to the FCSL, helping the Winter Park Diamond Dawgs to a championship title while leading the league with six home runs and 29 RBI. Between Sanford and Winter Park, Lucroy batted .325 in two seasons of collegiate summer baseball, with eight home runs and 41 RBI in 60 games.

During his junior year at Louisiana–Lafayette, Lucroy tied his own school record with five hits in a 10–6 win over South Alabama. That May, Lucroy received his second career Sun Belt Conference player of the week award when he went 8-for-14 with four extra-base hits and a 1.000 slugging percentage in a three-game sweep of Louisiana–Monroe. By the end of the month, Lucroy had helped take Louisiana–Lafayette to the Sun Belt Conference regular-season title, leading the team with a .373 batting average, 87 hits, 19 doubles, 59 RBI, and 155 total bases, the last of which was a school record. He was one of three Cajuns named to the All-Sun Belt Conference First Team that year, joining pitcher Buddy Glass and designated hitter Scott Hawkins. Despite falling to New Orleans in that year's Sun Belt Conference tournament, Lucroy was once again named to the All-Conference first team, while Louisiana–Lafayette clinched a spot in the 2007 NCAA Division I baseball tournament. Facing Texas A&M in the regional finals, Lucroy hit his 18th home run of the season and recorded his 182nd collegiate RBI, breaking Damian Grossie's all-time school record. Louisiana–Lafayette's tournament run came to an end the next night when Texas A&M defeated them 5–2 in the elimination game. Lucroy finished his collegiate career with a school-record 184 RBI, 414 total bases, and 54 doubles, and was also among the school's top hitters with 241 hits, 35 home runs, a .612 slugging percentage, and a .356 batting average.

On May 2, 2026, Lucroy’s No. 21 jersey was retired by the Louisiana baseball program in a ceremony at M. L. Tigue Moore Field at Russo Park before their scheduled Saturday afternoon game. Lucroy’s number joined former Cajun great Ron Guidry’s No. 3 and former Cajuns head coach Tony Robichaux’s No. 36. Lucroy is the first offensive player to have their number retired by the program.

== Professional career ==
=== Draft and minor leagues ===
Following his junior year of college, the Milwaukee Brewers selected Lucroy in the third round, 101st overall, of the 2007 MLB draft. He signed with the team only two days after the draft, agreeing to a signing bonus of $340,000 and beginning his professional baseball career. After signing with the Brewers, Lucroy joined the Rookie-level Helena Brewers of the Pioneer League, with whom he batted .342 with four home runs and 39 RBI in 61 games and 234 at bats. He was named both a Pioneer League Post-Season All-Star and a Baseball America Rookie All-Star for his performance that year. When the regular minor league season ended, Lucroy joined the North Shore Honu of the Hawaii Winter Baseball league, where he developed his defensive abilities in preparation for a promotion to Low-A for the 2008 season. He batted .299 in 23 winter league games, with eight RBI and 23 hits in 77 at bats. In addition to playing baseball, Lucroy, who had majored in environmental and sustainable resources at Louisiana, kept a blog about Hawaiian ecology for the Minor League Baseball website.

Lucroy started the 2008 minor league season with the Low-A West Virginia Power of the South Atlantic League. After batting .310 with 74 hits, 10 home runs and 33 RBI in West Virginia, Lucroy was promoted to the Brevard County Manatees of the Class A-Advanced Florida State League on June 19, the day after his appearance at the South Atlantic League All-Star Game. His offensive momentum did not slow with the promotion: by July 12, Lucroy was batting .338 with four home runs and 18 RBI in 21 Florida State League games. Batting third in the Manatees' lineup, Lucroy hit .292 with 10 home runs and 44 RBI in 64 games after his promotion. In addition to his offensive performance, Lucroy's coaches in West Virginia and Brevard County valued his defensive abilities. By 2008, Lucroy could complete a throw from home plate to second base in 1.68 seconds, with 1.8 seconds considered MLB-caliber. In a 2016 retrospective, longtime Brevard County public address announcer J. C. Meyerholz referred to Lucroy as "one of the best positional players in my 12 years with Manatees".

Lucroy received an invitation to the Brewers' spring training in 2009. Ultimately, the Brewers passed over Lucroy and Ángel Salomé in favor of promoting Carlos Corporan to the major leagues, and Lucroy spent the season with the Double-A Huntsville Stars of the Southern League. That July, Lucroy appeared in the Southern League All-Star Game, recording an RBI for the North Division in their 7–0 shutout of the South Division team. After a slow start to the season, Lucroy ultimately batted .267 with nine home runs, 66 RBI, and 112 hits in 419 at bats and 125 games, including a franchise record-tying 22-game hitting streak in August. After the conclusion of the regular minor league season, Lucroy joined the Peoria Javelinas of the Arizona Fall League, where his home run and two RBI within the first games helped push Lucroy over Salomé in the Brewers' farm system. Lucroy appeared in 17 fall league games, where he batted .310 with two home runs and 10 RBI in 58 at bats.

=== Milwaukee Brewers (2010–2016) ===
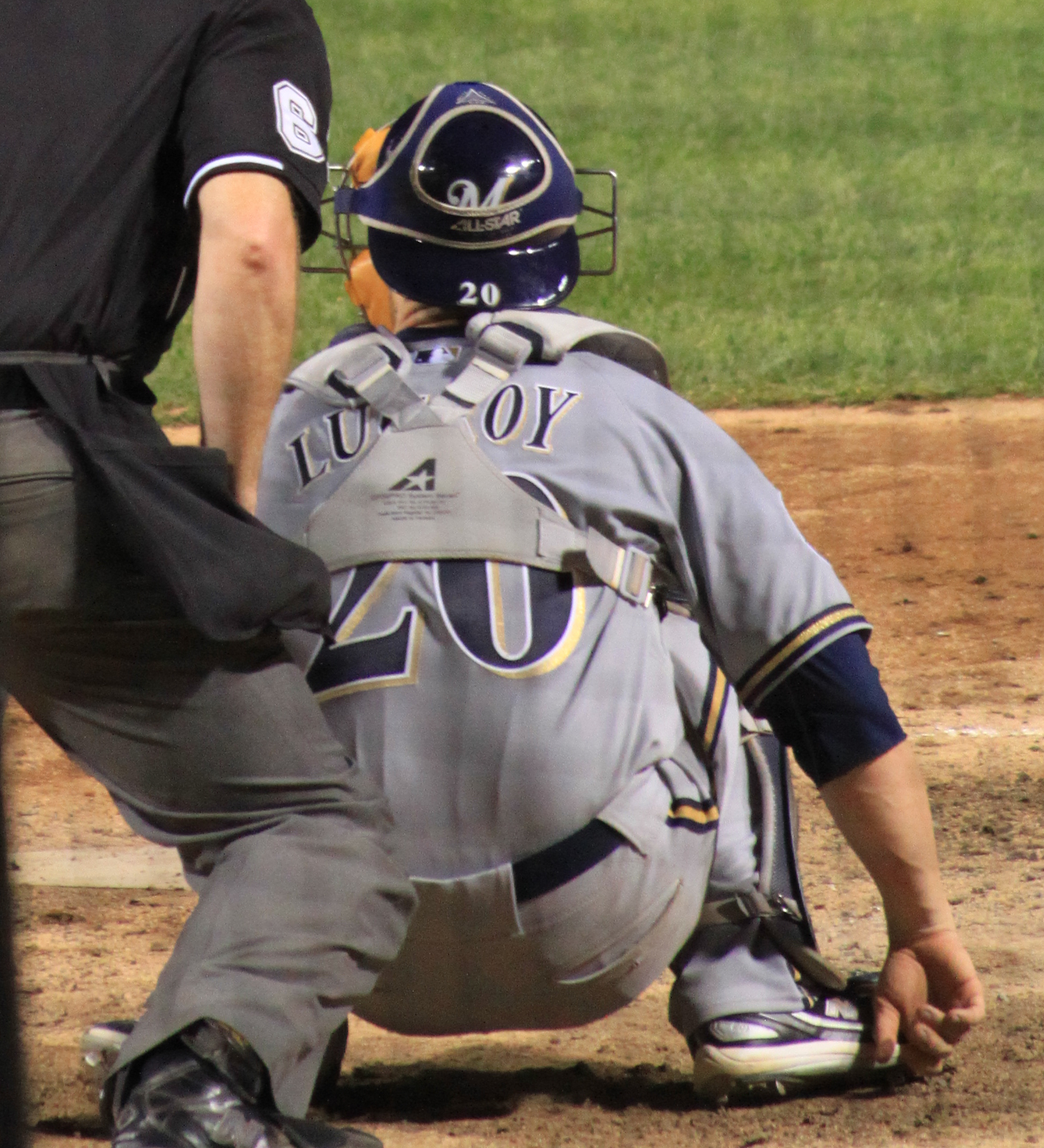
Lucroy with the Brewers in 2010

Lucroy opened the 2010 season with Huntsville, but was promoted to the Triple-A Nashville Sounds after only 10 games, during which he had at least one hit in every outing and 19 overall. When Gregg Zaun was placed on the 15-day disabled list with a shoulder injury on May 21, Lucroy, who had been hitting .238 with two home runs and 11 RBI in 21 minor-league games, was called up in his place. Lucroy made his MLB debut and recorded his first major league hit the next day, hitting a single in the eighth inning of a 15–3 loss to the Minnesota Twins. When it was revealed later that week that Zaun had torn his glenoid labrum and would likely miss the remainder of the season, the Brewers decided to keep Lucroy in the majors, with George Kottaras serving as the team's starting catcher. Lucroy's first major league home run came on June 25, a three-run blast off of Ryan Rowland-Smith of the Seattle Mariners in an 8–3 Milwaukee victory. As the season progressed, the Brewers determined that Lucroy was a better defensive player than Kottaras, and he stepped into the starting catcher role by the end of July. Lucroy appeared in 75 games during his rookie season, batting .253 with four home runs and 26 RBI in 277 at bats. Behind the plate, he had a fielding percentage of .992 and threw out 31 percent of attempted base stealers. Despite putting up above-average numbers for a rookie, particularly one thrust into a starting role, Lucroy was disappointed in his own season, telling reporters, "I have not shown my true worth ... I don't have any excuses for it. I just stunk – bottom line."

A number of Brewers suffered injuries during spring training in 2011, including Lucroy, who fractured the little finger on his throwing hand during a drill. The fracture required surgery to put a pin in the finger, and it was unclear if he would be available for Opening Day. The recovery process took two months, with Lucroy returning to the Brewers lineup on April 13. Although early discussions by team officials suggested easing Lucroy back into games, continuing to give the bulk of playing time to fill-ins Wil Nieves and George Kottaras, manager Ron Roenicke ultimately decided that Lucroy would immediately return to his role as the Brewers' everyday catcher. On May 28, Lucroy executed his first game-winning hit when he successfully completed a squeeze play in the bottom of the ninth inning to bring home Ryan Braun and help Milwaukee defeat the San Francisco Giants 3–2. Lucroy's ability to execute squeeze plays on bunts would become a defining characteristic of his approach at the plate, with his Brewers teammates nicknaming him "Mr. Squeeze". Lucroy, who primarily batted eighth in the Brewers' order, drew praise from retired players like Bob Uecker and Jamie Quirk both for his offensive improvement and for his preparation behind the plate. He played in 136 regular season games during his sophomore season, batting .265 with 12 home runs and 59 RBI in 430 at bats.

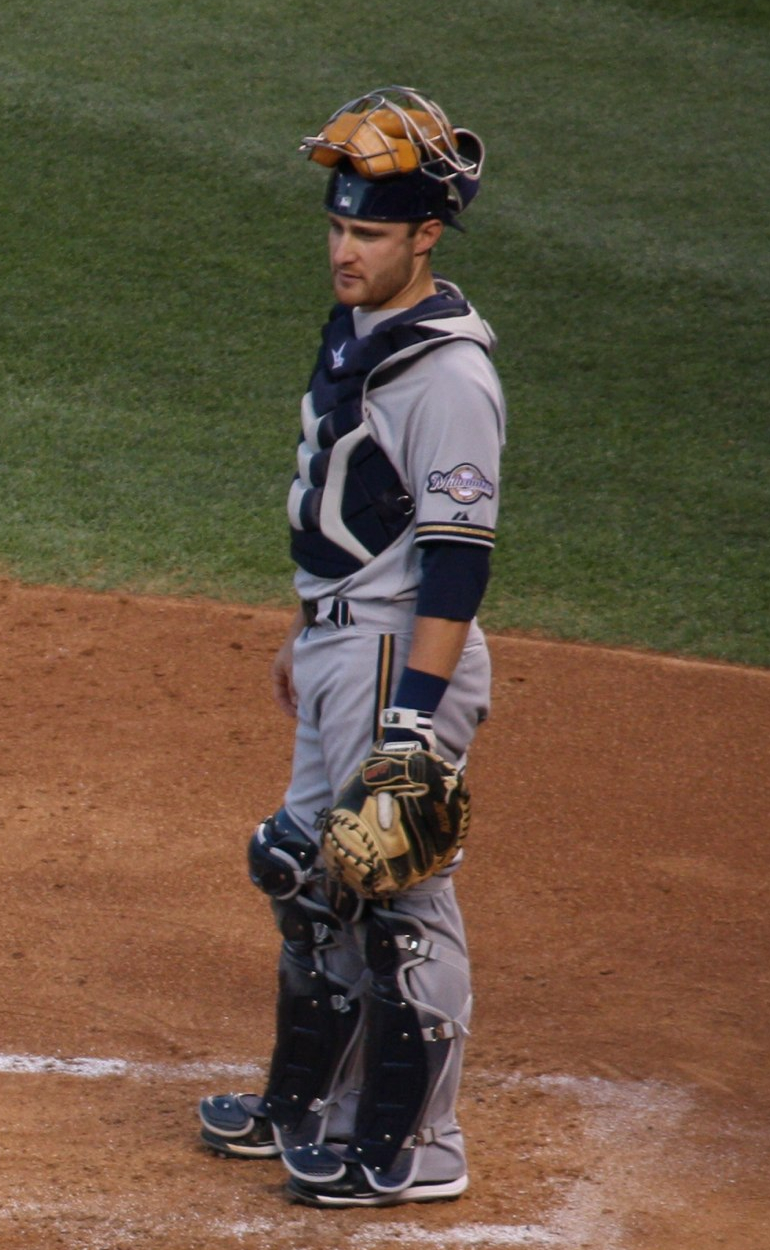
Lucroy with the Brewers in 2010

On September 23, 2011, the Brewers defeated the Florida Marlins 4–1 to clinch the National League (NL) Central title and a place in the 2011 MLB postseason. While facing the Arizona Diamondbacks in game 2 of the 2011 National League Division Series (NLDS), Lucroy once again executed a squeeze play on a bunt to drive in the go-ahead run and take the Brewers to a 2–0 series lead. Arizona battled back in Games 3 and 4, but the Brewers took the series in extra innings in the deciding game and advanced to the 2011 National League Championship Series (NLCS). Although the Brewers lost to the St. Louis Cardinals in six games, Lucroy recorded his first postseason home run in game 6.

On March 27, 2012, just before the start of the 2012 MLB season, the Brewers signed Lucroy to a five-year, $11 million contract extension, with additional incentives up to $13 million. At the end of May, Lucroy, who had been batting .345 with five homers and 30 RBI through the first two months of the season, suffered a boxer's fracture when his wife accidentally dropped a suitcase onto his hand. Although the team originally believed that his hand would heal without surgery, doctors later had to place a pin in the hand, and he was expected to spend six to eight weeks on the disabled list. Lucroy also had to tell Brewers fans to stop sending his wife hate mail for her perceived role in what he called a "freak thing". He missed 50 games before returning on July 26. Although Lucroy was disappointed in his own performance one month after his return, he batted .279 in that time frame. He finished the season batting .320 with 12 home runs and 58 RBI in 96 games. The Brewers, meanwhile, finished the season with an 83–79 record, third in the NL Central, and they did not appear in the playoffs.

Lucroy began the 2013 MLB season in a slump, with his batting average down to .208 by May 20, but he soon turned around his performance with 14 home runs and a .345 average in his next 46 games. Lucroy's hot streak was rewarded with a second-half bump up in the batting order. Injuries to Aramis Ramirez and Corey Hart, as well as the highly publicized suspension of Ryan Braun for his involvement with performance-enhancing substances had left the Brewers without their usual power hitters, and Lucroy often batted fourth or fifth in the lineup in their absence. Lucroy saw action at first base, a position that the Brewers struggled to fill with a regular starter, for the first time during the 2013 season. Lucroy and Roenicke's decision to learn first base derived in part from the fact that he did not catch for Wily Peralta, who was exclusively paired with backup Martin Maldonado, and Lucroy desired an avenue to remain in the game even when Peralta was pitching. Roenicke wanted to use Lucroy only sparingly during the 2013 season, while devoting the next year's spring training to teaching him the position in full. Although Lucroy was one of the best offensive catchers in 2013, batting .280 with 18 home runs, 82 RBI, and a .795 on-base plus slugging in 147 games, he struggled defensively: his 20.8 percent caught stealing rate was the lowest among MLB's starting catchers, while Lucroy's eight errors and seven passed balls were both career highs.

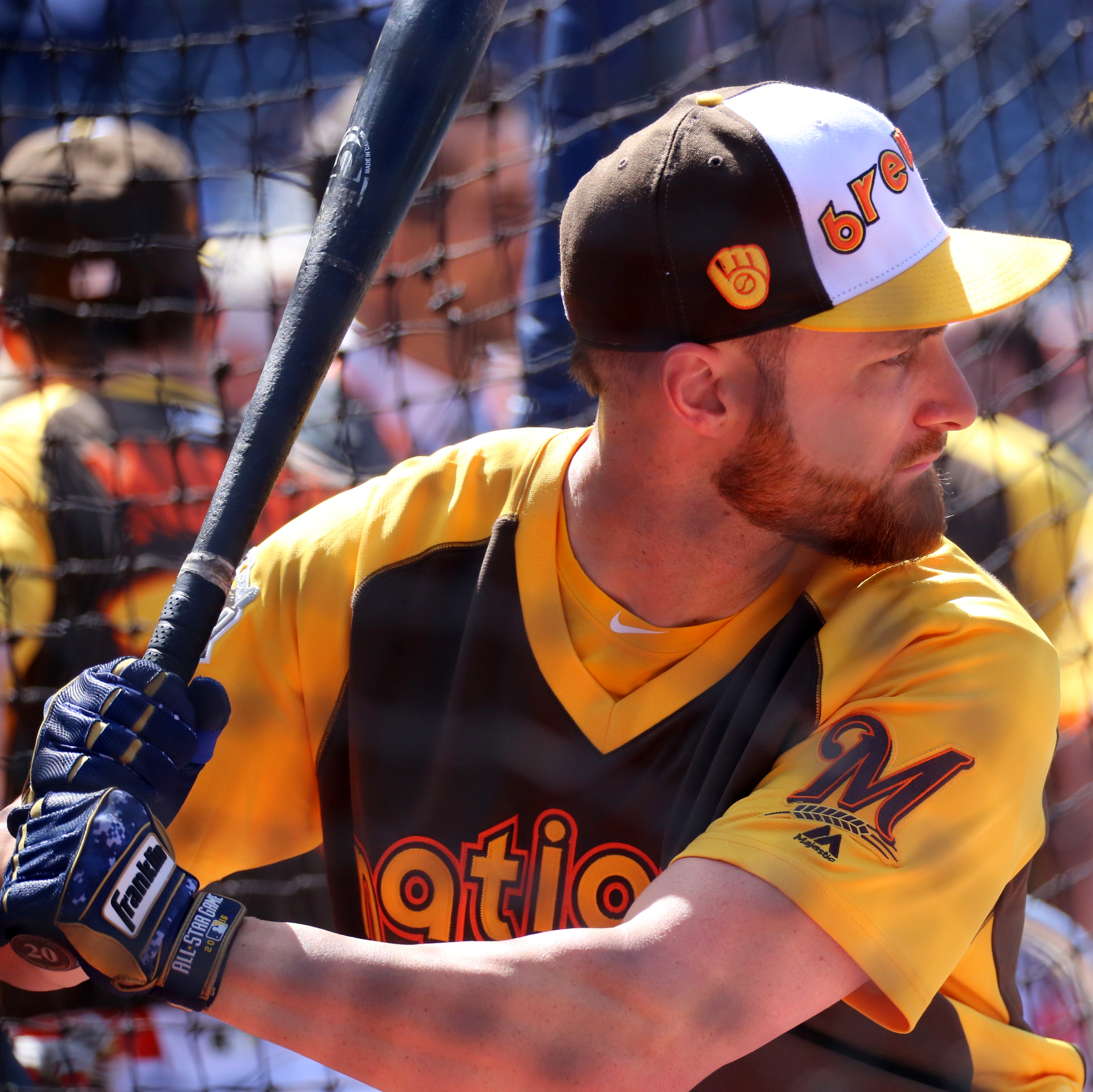
Lucroy at the 2016 MLB All-Star Game, representing the Brewers

Lucroy's strong first half of the 2014 season, with a .340/.403/.537 slash line, eight home runs, 37 RBI, and a Wins Above Replacement rating at or above 3.4, netted him his first MLB All-Star Game selection. (Note: Different sabermetrics organizations have different means of calculating Wins Above Replacement (WAR). Baseball Reference awarded Lucroy a 3.9 bWAR, while FanGraphs placed him at only 3.4 fWAR.) While both were named MLB All-Stars, Yadier Molina of the St. Louis Cardinals narrowly defeated Lucroy in a fan vote to determine the starting lineup for that year's game. When Molina tore a ligament in his thumb shortly before the All-Star Game, Lucroy was called to start, while Miguel Montero of the Diamondbacks filled Molina's roster spot. On September 27, Lucroy broke Iván Rodríguez's 18-year record of 46 doubles by a catcher in one season. While the hit was actually Lucroy's 53rd double of the year, seven of those came while he was playing first base. Knowing that Lucroy was close to breaking Rodríguez's record, the Brewers intentionally started Maldonado at first base. With a .301 average, 13 home runs, 69 RBI, and a league-leading 53 doubles in 153 games and 585 at bats, Lucroy came in fourth place in voting for the NL Most Valuable Player award, a title which ultimately went to Clayton Kershaw of the Los Angeles Dodgers. His defensive performance also won Lucroy the 2014 Fielding Bible Award at catcher.

When the extent of Ryan Braun's involvement in the Biogenesis scandal was revealed just prior to the 2015 season, Braun received an 85-game suspension, while Lucroy became the face of the Brewers franchise, featured in media advertisements and on the cover of Milwaukee's team media guide. This change coincided with a transfer of his responsibilities more towards first base. While Lucroy remained the Brewers' starting catcher, Adam Lind's poor performance against left-handed pitchers, as well as his recurring back pain, ensured that Lucroy would see more time at first base, in turn allowing Maldonado more time to catch. On April 20, however, Lucroy fractured the big toe on his left foot from a foul tip during a game against the Cincinnati Reds. Maldonado struggled in his absence, and upon Lucroy's June 1 return, the cumulative batting average for Milwaukee's catchers was only .162 through the first 51 games of the season. Lucroy also missed time at the end of the season when another foul tip resulted in a concussion during a September 8 game against the Marlins. Bookended by these two injuries, Lucroy's offensive metrics fell in 2015 to a .264 average with seven home runs and 43 RBI in 2013 games, and he attributed many of these difficulties to the altered mechanics caused by his injuries.

Coming off of a season in which the Brewers went 68–94 and headed into his 30th birthday, a point at which many catchers begin to decline and suffer more serious injuries, Lucroy told the Milwaukee Journal Sentinel that he was interested in being traded to a team with better chances of appearing in the 2016 postseason. As a result, the Brewers spent most of the first half of the season looking for a suitable trade target for Lucroy. Meanwhile, Lucroy, who entered the season determined to improve on his 2015 performance, received his second All-Star Game selection for batting .296 with 16 doubles, three triples, 10 home runs, and 39 RBI through the first half of the season. He was the third catcher selected for the NL team, joining Buster Posey and Wilson Ramos. He singled in his only plate appearance, preserving the 1.000 All-Star batting average that he had begun after recording two RBI doubles during the 2014 game. In 95 games and 338 at bats for the Brewers in 2016, Lucroy batted .299 with 13 home runs and 50 RBI.

=== Texas Rangers (2016–2017) ===
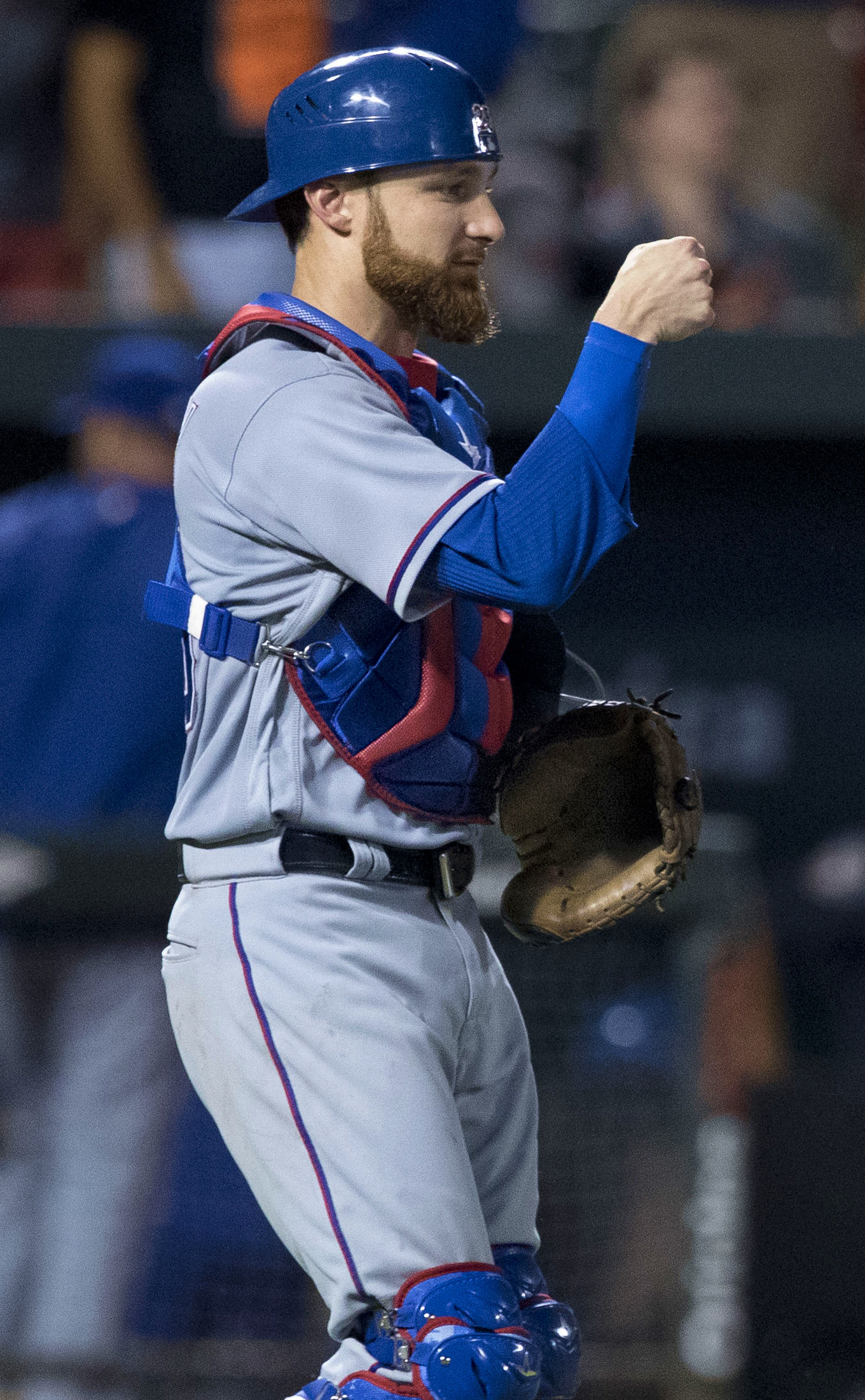
Lucroy with the Rangers in 2016

On July 30, 2016, shortly before the MLB trading deadline, Lucroy declined to move his no-trade clause to the Cleveland Indians for a deal that would have brought four prospects to Milwaukee. In his decision to veto the trade, Lucroy cited a lack of financial incentives from Cleveland, as well as their inability to guarantee that he would serve as the team's starting catcher in 2017. The next day, Lucroy and relief pitcher Jeremy Jeffress were sent to the Texas Rangers in exchange for Lewis Brinson, Luis Ortiz, and a player to be named later, ultimately Ryan Cordell. Lucroy and Jeffress formed two-thirds of the Rangers' trading deadline moves, with Carlos Beltran rounding out the acquisitions that general manager Jon Daniels hoped would take the team to the World Series.

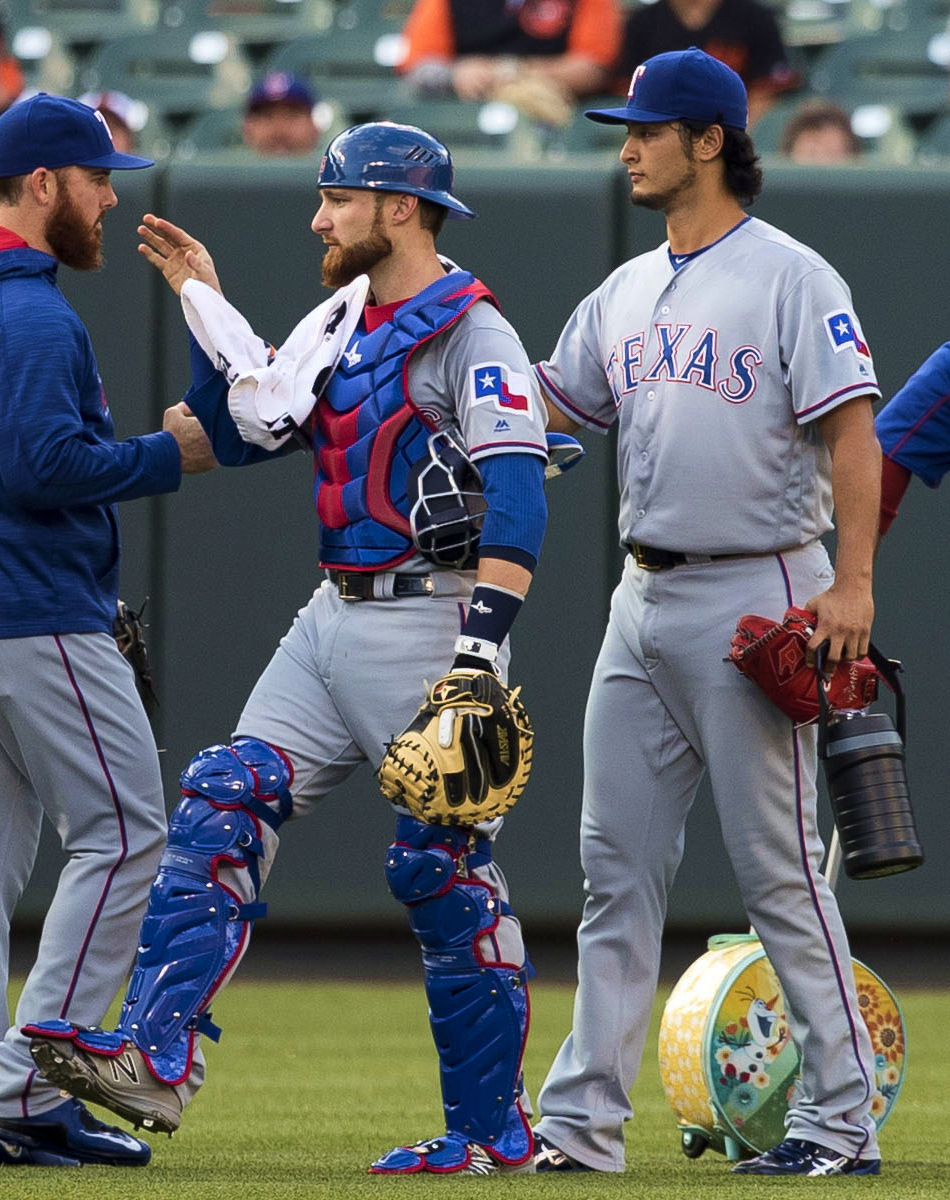
Lucroy with Yu Darvish in 2016

Bryan Holaday and Bobby Wilson, who had been platooning the catcher position in place of Robinson Chirinos while he was on the disabled list with a fractured right forearm, were both designated for assignment, while Chirinos dropped from the Rangers' primary catcher to Lucroy's backup. In his Texas debut, Lucroy caught for Yu Darvish, who allowed three solo home runs on the three pitch suggestions that he shook off from Lucroy. Outside of this first start, Lucroy had an immediate positive impact on the Rangers. In the first 14 games he started after being traded, Texas went 9–5, and the pitching staff had a cumulative 3.28 ERA, while as a batter, he had seven home runs and 14 RBI in his first 53 at bats. Lucroy attributed the pitching staff's turnaround to his use of the KISS principle, which forced the starting pitchers to rely more heavily on the stronger pitches in their repertoire than trying to trick batters with their less-developed secondary pitches. As the season progressed, Lucroy also became more adept at picking off attempted base stealers; by September 22, he had thrown out 42 baserunners in 109 attempts. Lucroy batted .276 in 47 games after his trade to Texas, with 11 home runs and 31 RBI in 152 at bats. As a catcher, he had a perfect fielding percentage and threw out 36 percent of attempted baserunners.

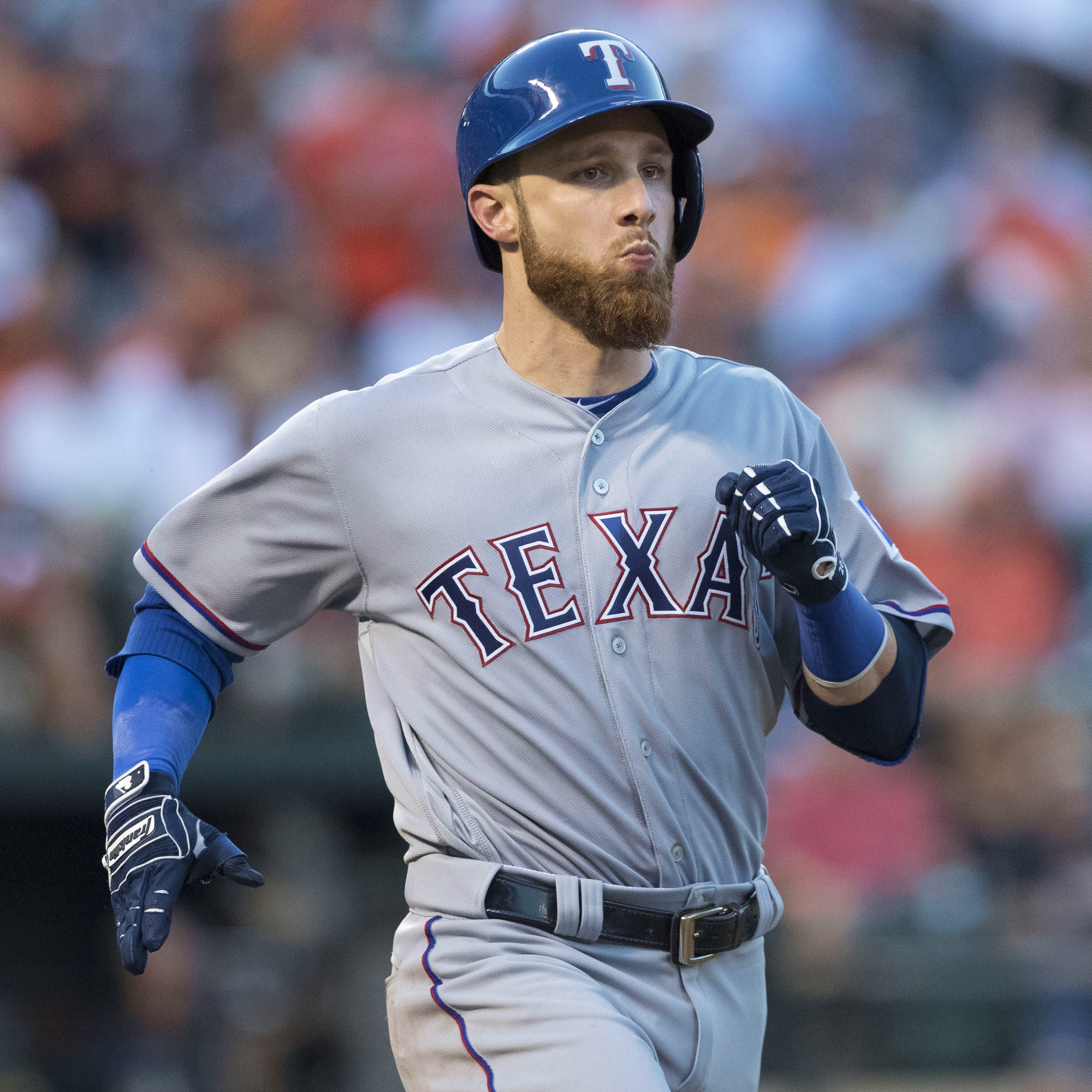
Lucroy with the Rangers in 2016

The Rangers clinched their second consecutive AL West title on September 23, 2016, with a 3–0 shutout win over the Oakland Athletics. They were then swept by the Toronto Blue Jays in the AL Division Series (ALDS), with Lucroy going only 1-for-12 in the three-game postseason matchup. He also struggled defensively during the series, allowing the game-tying passed ball in the sixth inning of Game 3. Despite the Rangers' early playoff exit, Lucroy said he had no regrets about rejecting a trade to the Indians, who clinched the AL pennant and went to the 2016 World Series, telling ESPN that his refusal to waive his no-trade clause was "an economic decision. Period."

Immediately after the conclusion of the World Series, the Rangers picked up Lucroy's $5.25 million contract option for the 2017 season, which they inherited in his trade from the Brewers. Coming directly off of his gold medal performance at the 2017 World Baseball Classic, Lucroy had a difficult readjustment to the MLB season. Through May 7, he was batting only .225, but turned the slump around with four multi-hit games the following week. By the end of June, however, Lucroy was steadily losing playing time to Chirinos, a decision that was made partially to keep both catchers healthy during a stretch of 20 games in as many days, but also in part because Chirinos was outperforming Lucroy offensively. Between the second week of the season and the third week of July, Lucroy did not catch more than three consecutive games. Chirinos's resurgence made Lucroy an attractive trade chip for a struggling Rangers bullpen, and rumors that he would be traded followed him throughout July. In his second season with the Rangers, Lucroy batted .242 with four home runs and 27 RBI in 77 games, while Chirinos had 12 home runs and 26 RBI in 46 games within that same time period.

=== Colorado Rockies (2017) ===
On July 30, 2017, the Rangers traded Lucroy to the Colorado Rockies in exchange for a player to be named later, confirmed the following month to be Rookie League prospect Pedro Gonzalez. Although Lucroy left the Rangers in an offensive slump, the Rockies were primarily interested in adding a defensive veteran to bolster their young pitching and catching staff. The starting rotation was especially young, with an average age of 23, and Lucroy was tasked with helping guide them through the final months of the season and into a potential postseason run. He was meant to start with the new team immediately, taking over the starting catcher role from Tony Wolters, but was a last-minute scratch on August 1 with a stomach illness. Although Lucroy continued to put up pedestrian numbers as a batter, his impact on the Rockies' pitching staff was immediate: the average ERA from the starting rotation dropped from 4.70 to 4.23 between July 30 and September 12, and the bullpen ERA similarly fell from 4.41 to 4.16 since Lucroy was traded to Colorado. The Rockies clinched one of two NL Wild Card spots on September 30, and although Lucroy had two doubles, two runs, and one RBI in that year's NL Wild Card Game, the Arizona Diamondbacks defeated Colorado 11–8. Lucroy appeared in 46 games for the Rockies after his midseason trade, batting .310 with two home runs and 13 RBI in 142 at bats. He became a free agent at the conclusion of the season.

=== Oakland Athletics (2018) ===
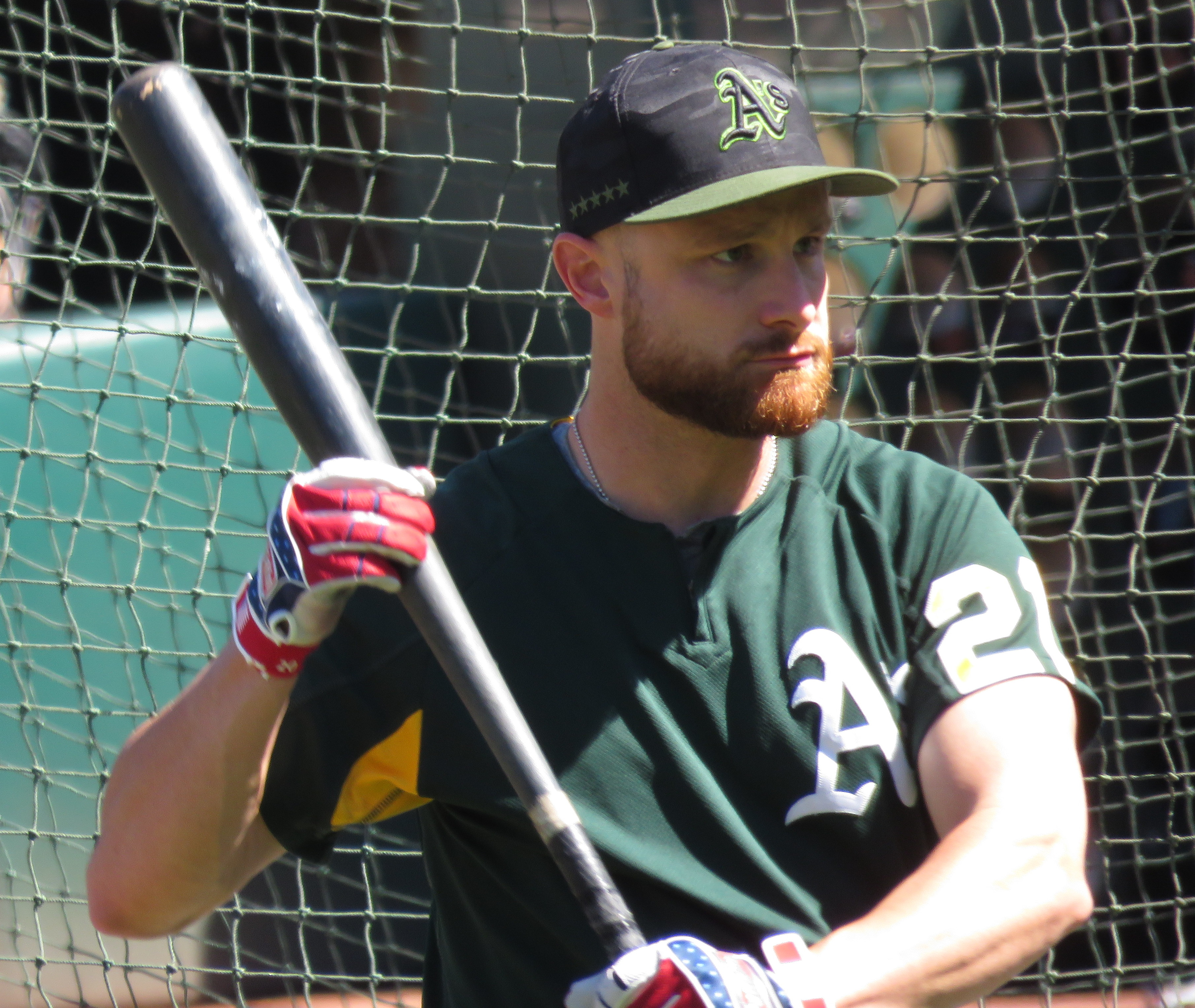
Lucroy with the Athletics in 2018

Although Oakland Athletics general manager David Forst had said throughout the offseason that he intended to carry Bruce Maxwell and Josh Phegley as the team's catchers into the 2018 season, when Lucroy remained unsigned throughout the usual free agency period, the Athletics reached out to him. On March 9, he signed a one-year contract with Oakland, moving Maxwell and Phegley down the depth chart and pushing pitcher Jairo Labourt off of the 40-man roster. On April 21, Lucroy caught his first no-hitter when Sean Manaea blanked the Boston Red Sox in 108 pitches. Lucroy, who had previously helped take no-hitters deep into games, referred to the game as the most well-executed pitching effort that he had ever caught. Although he did not hit a home run through his first 31 games, the longest drought in his MLB career, Lucroy produced at the plate in other ways, with a .295 batting average by May 15. His first home run of the season came two weeks later, a solo shot in a 2–1 defeat of the Diamondbacks on May 27. The 2018 season proved an overall step back for Lucroy at the plate, batting .241 with four home runs and 51 RBI, but the Athletics' front office praised his work with their pitching staff. Lucroy enjoyed his time in Oakland, particularly the chemistry built among the team, and in August he told reporters, "We're all running together. A bunch of rejects in Oakland, all having a good time."

The Athletics, who had finished last in the AL West for three seasons prior, clinched a playoff berth on September 24, with Lucroy providing a home run in their 7–3 defeat of the Seattle Mariners. Their brief postseason run was cut short, however, with a 7–2 defeat to the New York Yankees in the 2018 American League Wild Card Game. Despite the loss, Lucroy did break Luis Severino's no-hitter with a single to left field in the fifth inning. Lucroy became a free agent at the end of the season, and although he was open to returning to Oakland, the two parties could not compromise on contractual terms.

=== Los Angeles Angels (2019) ===
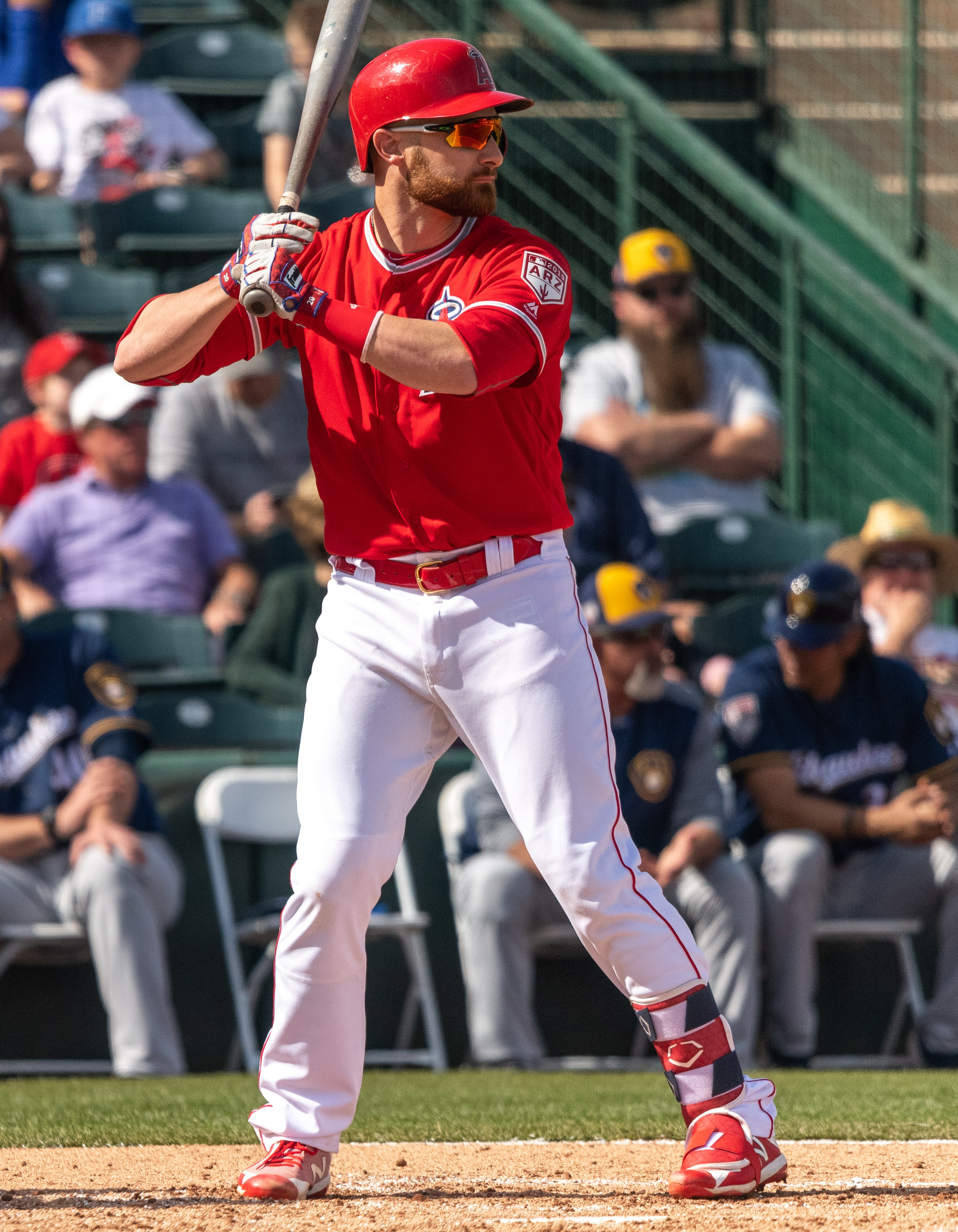
Lucroy with the Angels during spring training in 2019

The Los Angeles Angels, who were in need of a veteran supplement for young catchers José Briceño and Kevan Smith, signed Lucroy to a one-year, $3.35 million contract on December 28, 2018. Lucroy believed that his experience playing for the Athletics and Rangers, two teams that the Angels regularly faced as members of the AL West, would give him an advantage on his new team, and he also valued the opportunity to work under manager Brad Ausmus, a former MLB catcher. By May, Lucroy had become the team's starting catcher, receiving twice as much time at the plate as Smith, who became the backup. Lucroy caught in 67 games for the Angels, starting 61 behind the plate and posting a fielding percentage of .995 while throwing out 26 percent of attempted base runners. He also batted .242 in 74 games, with seven home runs and 30 RBI in 240 at bats.

On July 7, 2019, Jake Marisnick was attempting to score on a sacrifice fly from George Springer in a tied game between the Angels and Houston Astros when he collided with Lucroy, who had been waiting at home plate. Marisnick was ruled out on the play for colliding with the opposing team's catcher, while Lucroy had difficulty getting up and had to be carted off the field with a nosebleed. He left the game to go to the local hospital, where he was diagnosed with a concussion and a broken nose. Kevan Smith and Dustin Garneau split catching duties while Lucroy, who said that he had no memory of the actual collision, recovered. Both Ausmus and Yadier Molina criticized Marisnick for the play, Marisnick was ultimately suspended for two games for a violation of Rule 6.01 (i), which was designed to protect catchers blocking the plate from violent collisions. On August 2, 2019, only one game after Lucroy returned from the injured list, the Angels designated him for assignment in favor of Max Stassi, for whom they had traded while Lucroy was injured.

=== Chicago Cubs (2019) ===
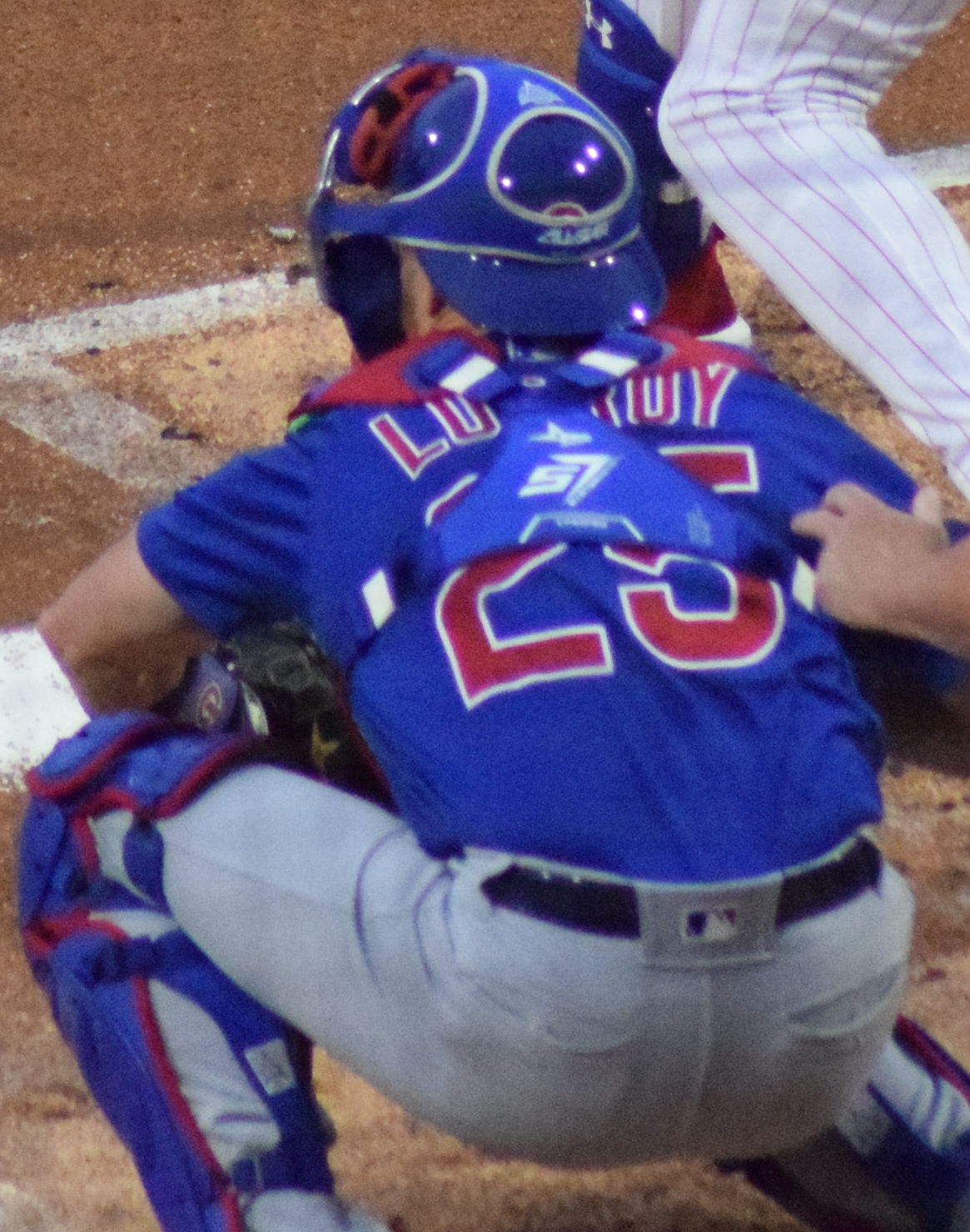
Lucroy with the Cubs in 2019

Only two days after Lucroy was released from the Angels, he was quickly signed to the Chicago Cubs, who were in need of a regular catcher to replace an injured Willson Contreras. Martin Maldonado, who had previously filled in for Contreras in times of injury, had just been traded to the Houston Astros in exchange for Tony Kemp, leaving the Cubs without a veteran catcher. Despite not having played in a major league game since his July concussion, Lucroy was added to the starting lineup the day after signing with the Cubs, batting eighth against Alex Wood of the Cincinnati Reds. When Contreras returned later in August, Lucroy was demoted to pinch hitter and third-string catcher, behind Contreras and backup Victor Caratini. On October 31, immediately after the conclusion of the 2019 World Series, Lucroy became a free agent. In his limited playing time with Chicago, Lucroy batted .189 in 53 at bats, with one home run and six RBI. He caught in 20 games, starting behind the plate for 14, and also made four appearances at first base.

=== Boston Red Sox (2020) ===
During the 2019–20 MLB offseason, Lucroy underwent surgery to place a titanium plate in his neck, which would repair the herniated disk that had affected him for the past few years. Lucroy was one of seven catchers that the Boston Red Sox brought to spring training in 2020, signing a minor league contract with the team on February 19. He was in competition with Kevin Plawecki and several others to back up Christian Vázquez, who was coming off of a breakout 2019 season. The COVID-19 pandemic caused a number of interruptions to the 2020 MLB season, however, and when the Red Sox submitted their list of 47 eligible players on July 20, Lucroy was omitted. It was believed that this omission was due to procedural issues, and that Lucroy would rejoin the team later that week. Lucroy appeared in only one game for the Red Sox, playing in the eighth and ninth inning of their 13–2 Opening Day rout of the Baltimore Orioles, before he was designated for assignment on July 29 to make room for pitcher Chris Mazza. With the cancellation of the 2020 Minor League Baseball season, Lucroy instead spent the month of August at the Red Sox' alternate training site, McCoy Stadium in Pawtucket, Rhode Island, where he mentored Boston's young pitching prospects and waited for another opportunity to play in the majors. On September 15, the Red Sox released Lucroy from his contract.

=== Philadelphia Phillies (2020) ===
Only hours after Lucroy's release from the Red Sox, the Philadelphia Phillies, who were in need of catching depth after J. T. Realmuto was sidelined with a hip injury, signed Lucroy to a minor league contract and assigned him to their alternate training site in the Lehigh Valley. The move was made just before MLB teams had to submit their postseason rosters, thus allowing the Phillies to carry an extra catcher into a potential playoff run. Philadelphia did not reach the 2020 MLB postseason, and Lucroy became a free agent after the World Series without having appeared in a game for the team.

=== Washington Nationals (2021) ===
Lucroy signed a minor league contract with the Chicago White Sox on February 11, 2021, where he was placed in competition with Zack Collins, Yermín Mercedes, and Seby Zavala for a chance to back up Yasmani Grandal, who was promoted to starting catcher after James McCann joined the New York Mets in free agency. Although Lucroy did well in spring training, going 6 for 18 in 14 Cactus League games, he was released from the White Sox on March 29 to clear room on the 40-man roster for utility infielder Jake Lamb.

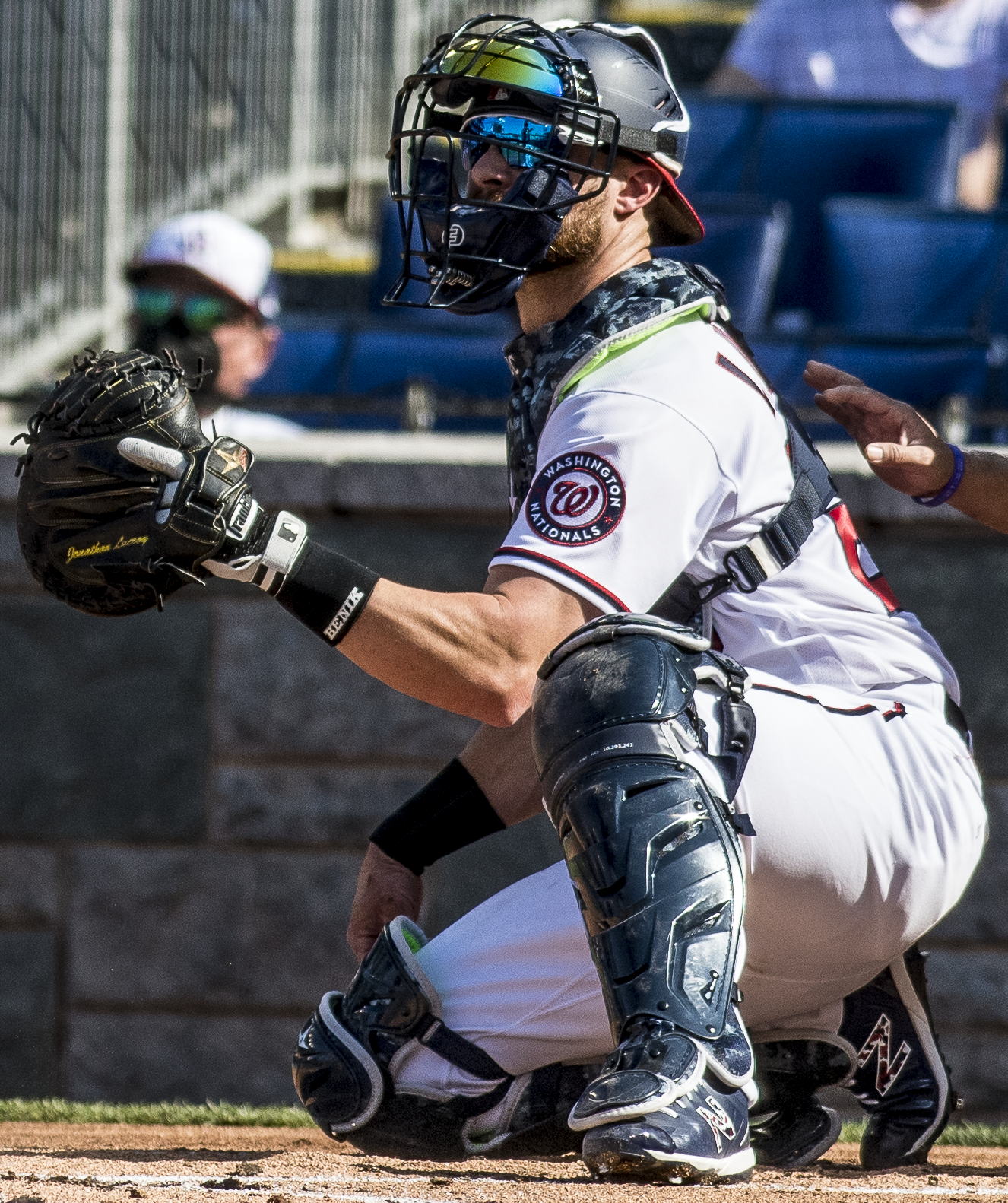
Lucroy with the Nationals in 2021

The Washington Nationals, whose 2021 season was delayed due to an outbreak of the COVID-19 virus, signed Lucroy to a minor league contract on April 3. With starting and backup catchers Yan Gomes and Alex Avila both sidelined with injuries, Lucroy was tasked with starting the Nationals' season. His Opening Day two-RBI double against Drew Smyly of the Atlanta Braves was both Lucroy's first major league hit since 2019 and provided the first two runs of the Nationals' season. His stint with Washington was short-lived: after going 5 for 14 through the first five games of the season, Lucroy was designated for assignment on April 12 to clear room for Josh Bell, Kyle Schwarber, and Josh Harrison, all of whom were returning from the COVID-19 list. He cleared waivers and was outrighted to the Nationals' alternate training site, but opted to become a free agent and find an opportunity with another team.

=== Atlanta Braves (2021) ===
On May 15, 2021, one month after leaving the Nationals, Lucroy signed a minor league contract with the Atlanta Braves, who were in need of added catching depth behind rookie starter William Contreras and veteran backup Jeff Mathis. Their previous starter Travis d'Arnaud was on the 60-day injured list with a torn thumb ligament, while third-string Tyler Flowers had just announced his retirement from MLB. On July 7, the Braves sent Contreras back down to the minor leagues in order to give him more time to develop, and Lucroy, who had been batting .220 in 114 plate appearances with the Triple-A Gwinnett Stripers, was promoted to Atlanta in his place. He appeared in only two games for Atlanta, recording one RBI in the process, before a trade with the Diamondbacks brought Stephen Vogt to the Braves on July 17. With the acquisition of Vogt, Lucroy was designated for assignment. He was once again outrighted, this time back to Gwinnett, but rejected the assignment and elected free agency. Although Lucroy did not play with the Braves during their 2021 World Series championship run, he was invited to throw out the ceremonial first pitch for Game 2 of the 2021 NLDS, in which the Braves played his longtime team, the Brewers.

=== Retirement ===
Lucroy announced his retirement from professional baseball on August 2, 2022. He finished his career with a lifetime .274 batting average in 4,140 at bats. In 1,210 games across 12 seasons, Lucroy recorded 108 home runs and 548 RBI. At the time of his retirement, he led all Brewers catchers with a .288 batting average, 752 hits, 143 doubles, 77 homers, 358 RBI, and 326 runs scored, and was second with 725 games caught.

== International career ==
Lucroy was one of 14 Brewers selected for the 2013 World Baseball Classic, where he caught for the United States national baseball team. He went 2-for-5 with an RBI in five tournament games before the United States was eliminated by Puerto Rico in the second round. Four years later, Lucroy rejoined Team USA for the 2017 World Baseball Classic. This time, Lucroy and the United States team defeated Puerto Rico 8–0 in the championship game to take home their first World Baseball Classic gold medal.

== Coaching career ==
In July 2025, Lucroy served as a coach for the United States national under-18 baseball team's development program in Cary, North Carolina.

== Awards and honors ==
On August 6, 2022, Lucroy was formally inducted into the Milwaukee Brewers Wall of Honor. At the time his addition was announced, he led all catchers in franchise history with a career .288 batting average, 752 hits, 143 doubles, 77 home runs, 358 RBI, and 326 runs scored.

== Personal life ==
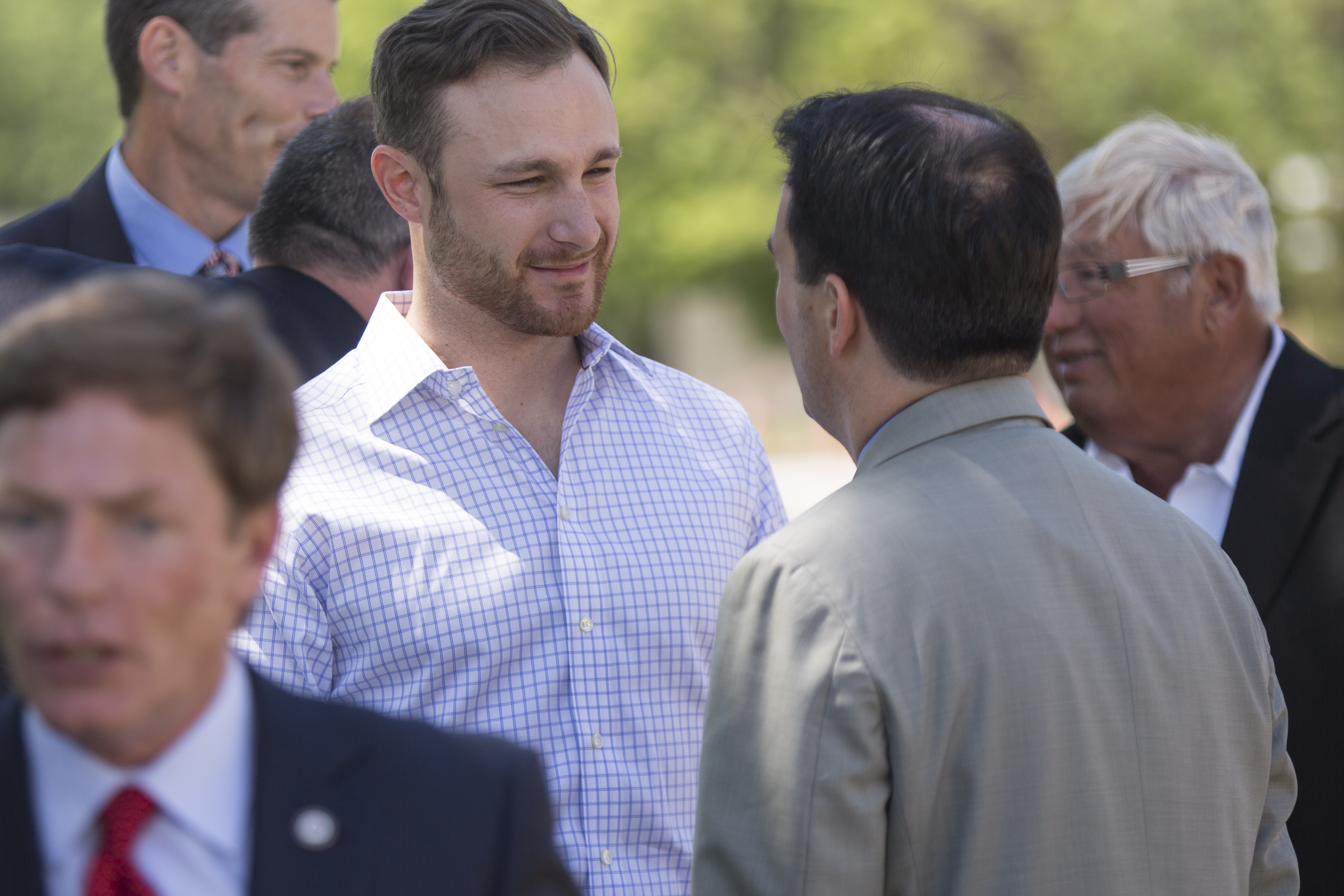
Lucroy in 2014 at an event for the Fisher House Foundation

Lucroy's younger brother David is also a professional baseball player. He pitched in college for the East Carolina Pirates before being taken in the 20th round of the 2015 MLB draft by the Brewers. Their other brother Matthew is not involved in athletics, and works as an emergency medical technician and firefighter. Lucroy's cousin Jeremy, meanwhile, was also a college baseball pitcher who served as Jonathan's batterymate throughout high school and during one season with Louisiana–Lafayette.

Lucroy's wife Sarah is also an alumna of Louisiana–Lafayette, and the couple met when they were both attending the university. They have two children together, a daughter named Ellia and a son named Easton. Although Lucroy was raised as a Christian, he did not fully identify with the religion until after his daughter was born in 2010. The Lucroys were close family friends with former Louisiana coach Tony Robichaux until his death in 2019.

After his college teammate and best friend was permanently paralyzed while serving in the Oklahoma National Guard during the War in Afghanistan, Lucroy became an advocate for veterans' affairs. During his tenure with the Brewers, he performed charity work for the Fisher House Foundation, Honor Flight, and providing scholarship opportunities to military families. In 2015, Lucroy accompanied Wisconsin Sen. Ron Johnson, who was impressed with his charity work, to Washington for then-President of the United States Barack Obama's State of the Union Address. That same year, Lucroy received the Bob Feller Act of Valor Award, presented annually to an MLB player affiliated with military and veteran philanthropy. Lucroy is politically conservative and supported Donald Trump's campaign for presidency in 2024.
