= FCSL =

FCSL may refer to:

- Florida Collegiate Summer League, A collegiate summer baseball league located in Central Florida, United States
- Florida Coastal School of Law, A law school located in Jacksonville, Florida, United States
