= Alfond Stadium (Rollins College) =

Stadium in Winter Park, Florida

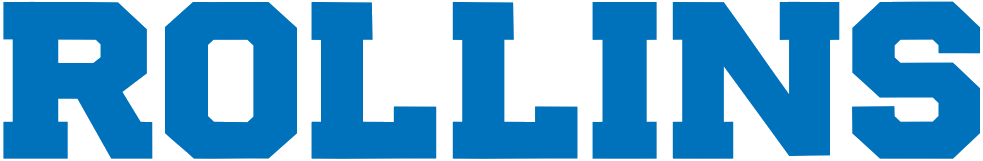

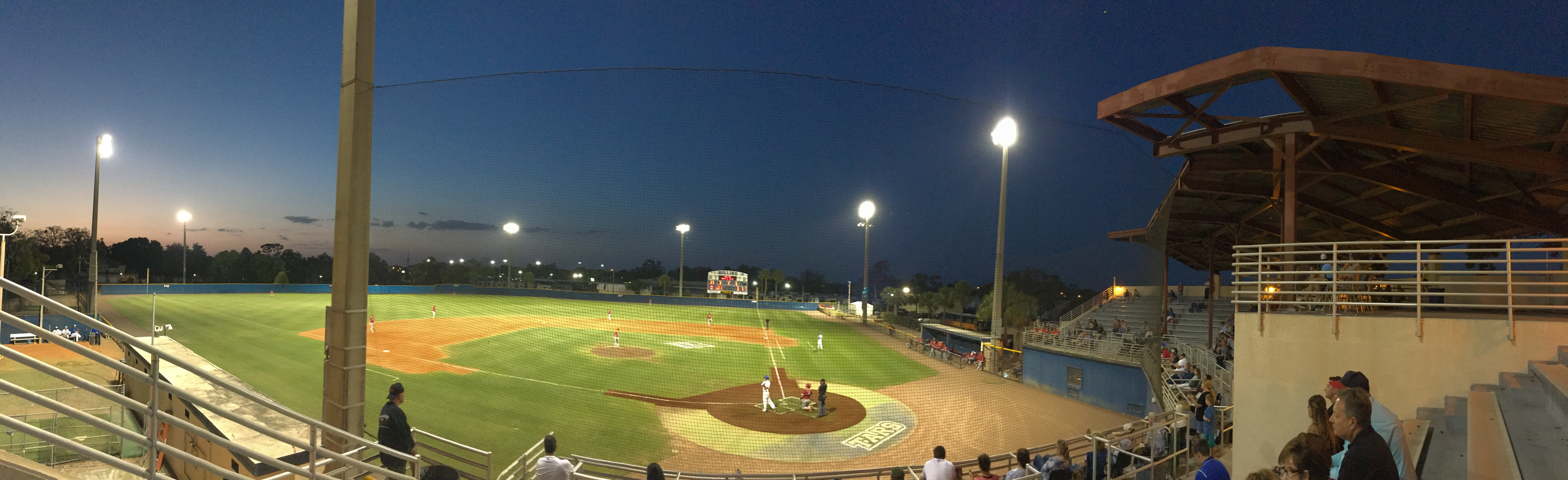
- View of the stadium in 2018

- Location within Florida Location within the United States
- Interactive map of Alfond Stadium
- Full name: Alfond Stadium at Harper-Shepherd Field
- Address: 801 N. Orange Ave. Winter Park, FL; U.S.
- Coordinates: 28.591272°N 81.359505°W
- Owner: Rollins College
- Operator: Rollins College Athletics
- Capacity: 1,000
- Surface: FieldTurf

Construction
- Opened: 1933; 93 years ago
- Renovated: 1983; 2002; 2004; 2012; 2018; 2019
- Expanded: March 8, 1983

Tenants
- Rollins Tars (NCAA DII, SSC) 1933-present Winter Park Diamond Dawgs (FCSL) 2004-2015

Website
- rollinssports.com/alfond-stadium

Alfond Stadium at Harper-Shepherd Field is a baseball stadium in Winter Park, Florida. It is home to the Rollins Tars baseball and softball teams. The stadium was home to the Winter Park Diamond Dawgs wood bat collegiate summer baseball league team from 2004 to 2015.

The stadium is named for Harold Alfond, a longtime Rollins College booster. The land was donated it to the City of Winter Park in 1926 by local merchants James E. Harper and F.W. Shepherd. Rollins obtained the property in 1933.

Past renovations included the clubhouse in 1983 and in 2002; a new scoreboard in 2004; and updated lighting in 2012. 2018 improvements include a FieldTurf infield; safety netting; covered batting cages; a JV locker room; and a newly paved parking lot with new lighting. 2019 renovations will include improvements to the stadium and clubhouse.

In 2014 the site was considered for a new ballpark to host the Brevard County Manatees (Class A-Advanced; Florida State League) but the financial details didn't work out.
