= Leesburg Lightning =

Collegiate summer baseball team in Florida

- Logo

Information
- League: FCSL
- Location: Leesburg, Florida
- Ballpark: Pat Thomas Stadium
- Founded: 2007
- League championships: 5 (2007, 2009, 2021, 2023, 2024)
- Colors: Black, Gold
- Mascot: Striker
- Management: Bruce Ericson
- Manager: Rich Billings

Current uniforms
Home	Away

The Leesburg Lightning are a wood bat collegiate summer baseball league team located in Leesburg, Florida. The team is a member of the Florida Collegiate Summer League (FCSL) and plays its home games at Pat Thomas Stadium. The team joined the FCSL in the 2007 season, and won their first championship the same year. They have won two more titles since. The Lightning are currently the only FCSL team to offer free admission to home games.

== History ==
The Lightning joined the FCSL in 2007 as an expansion team. According to league officials, Leesburg was a natural pick due to its rich baseball history. This gave the league five franchises. In their inaugural season, the Lightning reached the FCSL championship game at Tropicana Field where they defeated the Altamonte Springs Snappers 6-0 to win the FCSL championship. The team did not enjoy the same success in its second season however, finishing third in the regular season and losing in the semifinal playoff round to the eventual champions, the Clermont Mavericks.

2009 brought a new head coach to the Lightning, former Major League Baseball World Series MVP and Cy Young Award winner Frank Viola. Frank's knowledge of the game helped transform the group into a winner, as they finished with a 21-18 record. The Lightning led the league in batting average (.274) and home runs (19). After defeating the Belleview Bulldogs 2-0 in the semifinal, they went on to bring home the championship vs. the team that knocked them out the previous year (the Clermont Mavericks) by a score of 5-1. This made them the first team to win multiple FCSL titles.

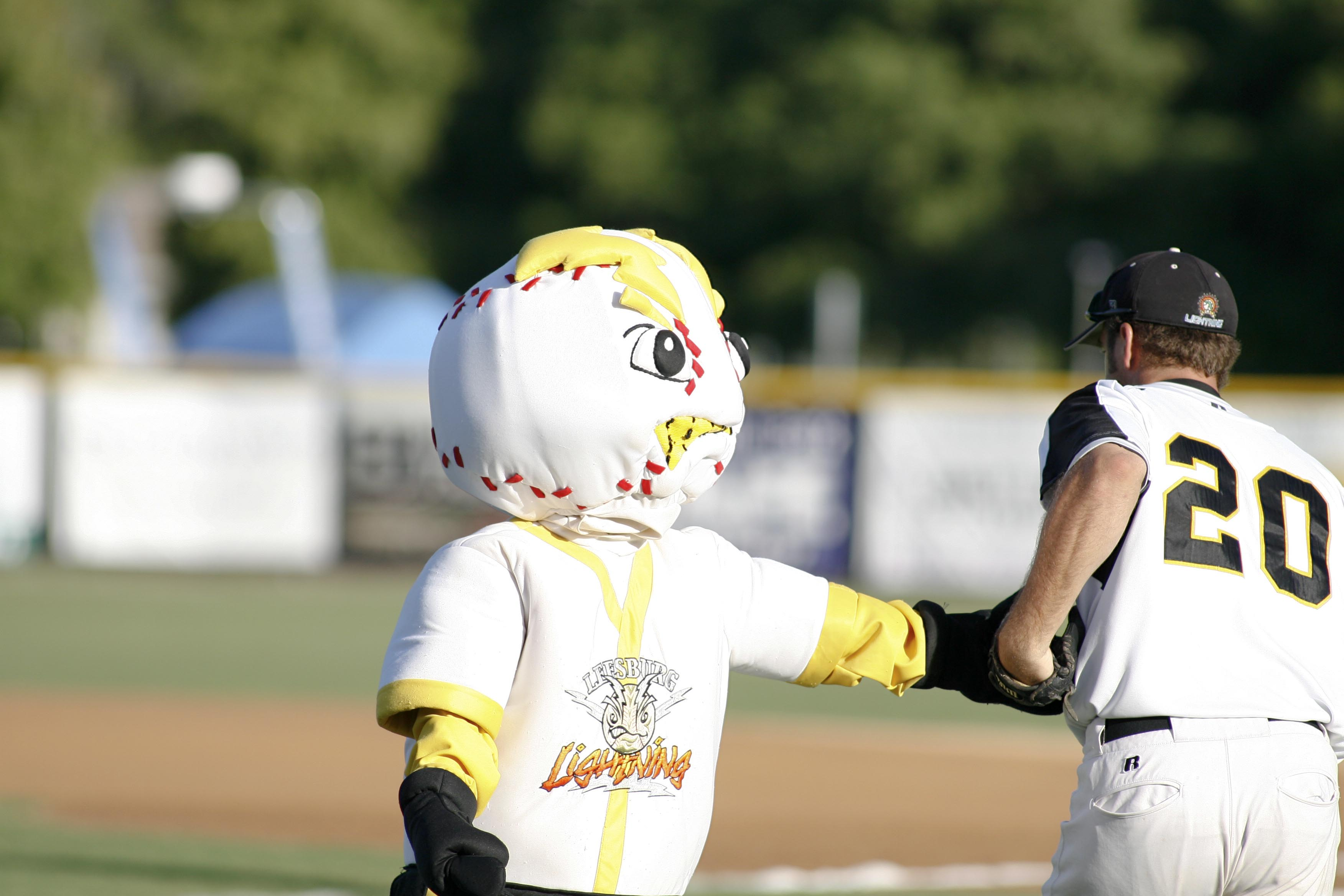
Lightning mascot, Striker

Viola returned in 2010 and helped the Lightning to their second straight 3rd place finish. They finished first in the league in hits with 361, and second in the league in doubles (73), home runs (12), and total bases (478). After disposing of the Sanford River Rats in the playoffs semifinals 2-0, the Lightning headed back to the championship game vs. the Winter Park Diamond Dawgs. In a hard fought game, the Diamond Dawgs defeated the Lightning by a score of 1-0.

In January 2011, the Brooklyn Cyclones offered Viola a coaching position. Dave Therneau stepped in to coach the Lightning for the 2011 season. He wasted little time proving that he could match Viola's success, leading the Lightning to a FCSL record 29-12 record. On offense, the team led the league in hits (392), runs (241), doubles (66), RBI (195), total bases (498), and walks (88). Shortstop Jake Tillotson set an FCSL record with 63 and scored a league high 42 runs while batting .371 at the plate. The pitching staff was equally impressive, posting league highs in ERA (3.28) and saves (12) and was 2nd in strikeouts (317) and WHIP (1.35). Relief pitcher Ethan Bader was named reliever of the year, leading the entire league in strikeouts with 47 in only 30.2 innings pitched. He had an ERA of 0.29 on the season. Despite the great balance on both sides of the ball, the Lightning fell in a three-game series to the #4 seed Sanford River Rats.

In 2014, the Lightning finished third in the league, with an 18–17 win–loss record. They also led the league in attendance by averaging 1,297 fans per game. In 2015, nine Lightning players were selected as FCSL All-Stars.

In 2021, the Lightning finished the season as the league's second seed. In the postseason, Leesburg defeated fifth-seeded Winter Park in a best-of-three championship series to win their third FCSL title.

== Playoff appearances ==
Year	First round		Semifinals (best-of-3)		FCSL championship game	
2007					Altamonte Springs Snappers	W (6-0)
2008	Sanford River Rats	W (3-1)	Clermont Mavericks	L (0-5), L (7-3)		
2009			Sandford River Rats	W (5-1), W (5-0)	Clermont Mavericks	W (5-1)
2010			Sanford River Rats	W (3-0), W (9-8)	Winter Park Diamond Dawgs	L (1-0)
2011			Sanford River Rats	W (2-1), L (4-3), L (9-2)		
2012			Sanford River Rats	W (14-8), L (8-7), W (5-1)	DeLand Suns	L (10-7)
2013			Sanford River Rats	W (1-0), W (6-4)	Winter Park Diamond Dawgs	L (3-0)
2014	DeLand Suns	W (5-3)	Sanford River Rats	L (15-3), L (8-4)		
2015			Altamonte Springs Boom	W (1-0), W (5-4)	Sanford River Rats	L (1-0)
2016	Winter Garden Squeeze	W (2-1)	Sanford River Rats	L (6-5), L (4-2)		
2017	Winter Garden Squeeze	L (9-4)				
2018			Winter Park Diamond Dawgs	W (1-0), L (3-2), L (7-6)		
2019	Seminole County Scorpions	W (4-2)	Winter Park Diamond Dawgs	L (8-4)		
2020	Seminole County Snappers	W (9-0)	Sanford River Rats	L (8-6), L (6-3)	Sanford River Rats	
2021			DeLand Suns	W (10-2), W (7-5)	Winter Park Diamond Dawgs	L (8-4), W (6-4), W (9-1)
2022			Sanford River Rats	L (9-1), W (6-2), W (6-3)	Winter Park Diamond Dawgs	L (6-1), W (6-5), L (11-3)
2023			Winter Park Diamond Dawgs	W (7-3), W (6-5)	Winter Garden Squeeze	W (5-4), L (4-3), W (7-2)
2024			Sanford River Rats	L (7-2), W (22-3), W (5-4)	DeLand Suns	W (7-2), W (3-2)
