= Ballpark (disambiguation) =

A ballpark (or ball park, also known as a baseball park or baseball stadium), is a venue where baseball is played.

Ball park or ballpark may also refer to:

== Venues ==
- The Ballpark at Hallsville, Hallsville, Texas
- The Ballpark at Harbor Yard, Bridgeport, Connecticut
- The Ballpark at Jackson, Jackson, Tennessee
- The Ballpark of the Palm Beaches, West Palm Beach, Florida
- The Ballpark (Gainesville), Gainesville, Florida
- The Ballpark (Old Orchard Beach), Old Orchard Beach, Maine
- The Ballpark at Arlington, now Choctaw Stadium, Arlington, Texas
- The Ballpark at Disney's Wide World of Sports, now The Stadium at the ESPN Wide World of Sports, Kissimmee, Florida
- The Ballpark in Grand Prairie, now AirHogs Stadium, Grand Prairie, Texas
- The Ballpark at St. Johns, now Jack Kaiser Stadium, New York City
- The Ballpark at Venetian Gardens, now Pat Thomas Stadium, Leesburg, Florida

== Other uses ==
- Ball Park Franks, the name of a brand of hot dogs made by Hillshire Brands
- Ballpark estimate, a rough estimate
- Ballpark model, a system under which users of a facility do so at their own risk

== See also ==
- Ball Park Music, a five-piece indie rock/pop band based in Brisbane, Australia
- Lists of baseball parks
- Ballpark station (disambiguation)
