= Altamonte Springs Boom =

Floridian collegiate summer baseball league team

Information
- League: FCSL
- Location: Altamonte Springs, Florida
- Ballpark: Lake Brantley High School
- Founded: 2015
- League championships: 1 (2016)
- Colors: Red, white, silver
- Ownership: Florida Collegiate Summer League

The Altamonte Springs Boom are a wood bat collegiate summer baseball league team located in Altamonte Springs, Florida. The team is a member of the Florida Collegiate Summer League (FCSL) and plays its home games at Lake Brantley High School Stadium. The club's inaugural season took place in 2015. The next season, the Boom finished with a record of 22–19, earning the league's second seed. The team then won a best-of-three playoff series against the DeLand Suns and defeated the Sanford River Rats in the title game to win their first FCSL championship, their only title to date.

== Playoff appearances ==
Year	First round	Semifinals (best-of-3)		FCSL championship game	
2015		Leesburg Lightning	L (1-0), L (5-4)		
2016		DeLand Suns	W (2-0), L (7-6), W (6-3)	Sanford River Rats	W (5-4)
