= Orlando Mavericks =

Defunct collegiate summer baseball team

Information
- League: FCSL
- Location: Orlando, Florida (2010); Clermont, Florida (2008–09)
- Ballpark: The First Academy (2010)
- Founded: 2008
- Folded: 2010
- League championships: 1 (2008)
- Former name(s): Clermont Mavericks (2008–09)
- Former ballparks: East Ridge High School (2008–09)
- Colors: Carolina Blue, Black
- Management: Jon Wano
- Manager: Scott Makarewicz

Current uniforms
Home	Away

The Orlando Mavericks were a wood bat collegiate summer baseball league team located in Orlando, Florida. The team is a member of the Florida Collegiate Summer League (FCSL) and plays its home games at The First Academy. The team joined the FCSL in the 2008 season, under the name the Clermont Mavericks and played their home games at East Ridge High School.

== History ==
The Mavericks joined the FCSL in 2008 as an expansion team, one of three franchises joining the league that year. This brought the total number of FCSL franchises to six. In their inaugural season, the Mavericks reached the FCSL championship game at Tropicana Field where they defeated the Belleview Bulldogs 9–1 to win the FCSL championship. Under their second season the Mavericks once again made it to the FCSL Championship Game but lost to the Leesburg Lightning 5–1. In their third season the Clermont Mavericks moved to The First Academy near Downtown Orlando and became the Orlando Mavericks.

== Playoff Appearances ==
Year	First round		Semifinals (best-of-3)		FCSL championship game	
2008	BYE		Leesburg Lightning	W (2–0)	Belleview Bulldogs	W (9–1)
2009			DeLand Suns	W (2–1)	Leesburg Lightning	L (5–1)
2010	DeLand Suns	W (3–2)	Winter Park Diamond Dawgs	L (10–2), L (8–2)		
