= Ballpark station =

Ballpark station may refer to:

- Ballpark station (Utah Transit Authority), a light rail station in Salt Lake City, Utah
- Richmond County Bank Ballpark station, a former railroad station in Staten Island, New York, sometimes referred to as "Ballpark"

== See also ==
- Ballpark (disambiguation)
