= Earl Inmon =

American football player (born 1954)

No. 59
- Position: Linebacker

Personal information
- Born: March 21, 1954 (age 72); Umatilla, Florida, U.S.
- Listed height: 6 ft 1 in (1.85 m)
- Listed weight: 215 lb (98 kg)

Career information
- High school: Umatilla
- College: Bethune–Cookman
- NFL draft: 1978: 7th round, 192nd overall pick

Career history
- Tampa Bay Buccaneers (1978)

Career NFL statistics
- Games played: 2
- Stats at Pro Football Reference

Earl G. Inmon (born March 21, 1954) is an American former professional football player who was a linebacker for the Tampa Bay Buccaneers of the National Football League (NFL) in 1978. He played college football for the Bethune–Cookman Wildcats.
