= Umatilla High School (Florida) =

Location
- 320 N. Trowell Avenue; Umatilla, Lake County, Florida 32784; United States; 28.9308086°N 81.6649397°W

Information
- Type: Public high school
- Established: 1910; 116 years ago
- School district: Lake County Schools
- NCES District ID: 120105001105
- Principal: Brent Frazier
- Staff: 44.00 (FTE)
- Grades: 9–12
- Enrollment: 861 (2022–2023)
- Student to teacher ratio: 19.57
- Campus type: Midsized Suburb
- Colors: Orange and Black
- Nickname: Bulldogs
- Accreditation: Southern Association of Colleges and Schools (part of Cognia)
- USNWR ranking: #462 in Florida
- National ranking: #11,109
- Website: uhs.lake.k12.fl.us

Umatilla High School is an American four-year comprehensive high school in Umatilla, Florida, United States. It is one of fifteen high schools in the Lake County Schools district, and opened in 1910 as a public school.

== History ==
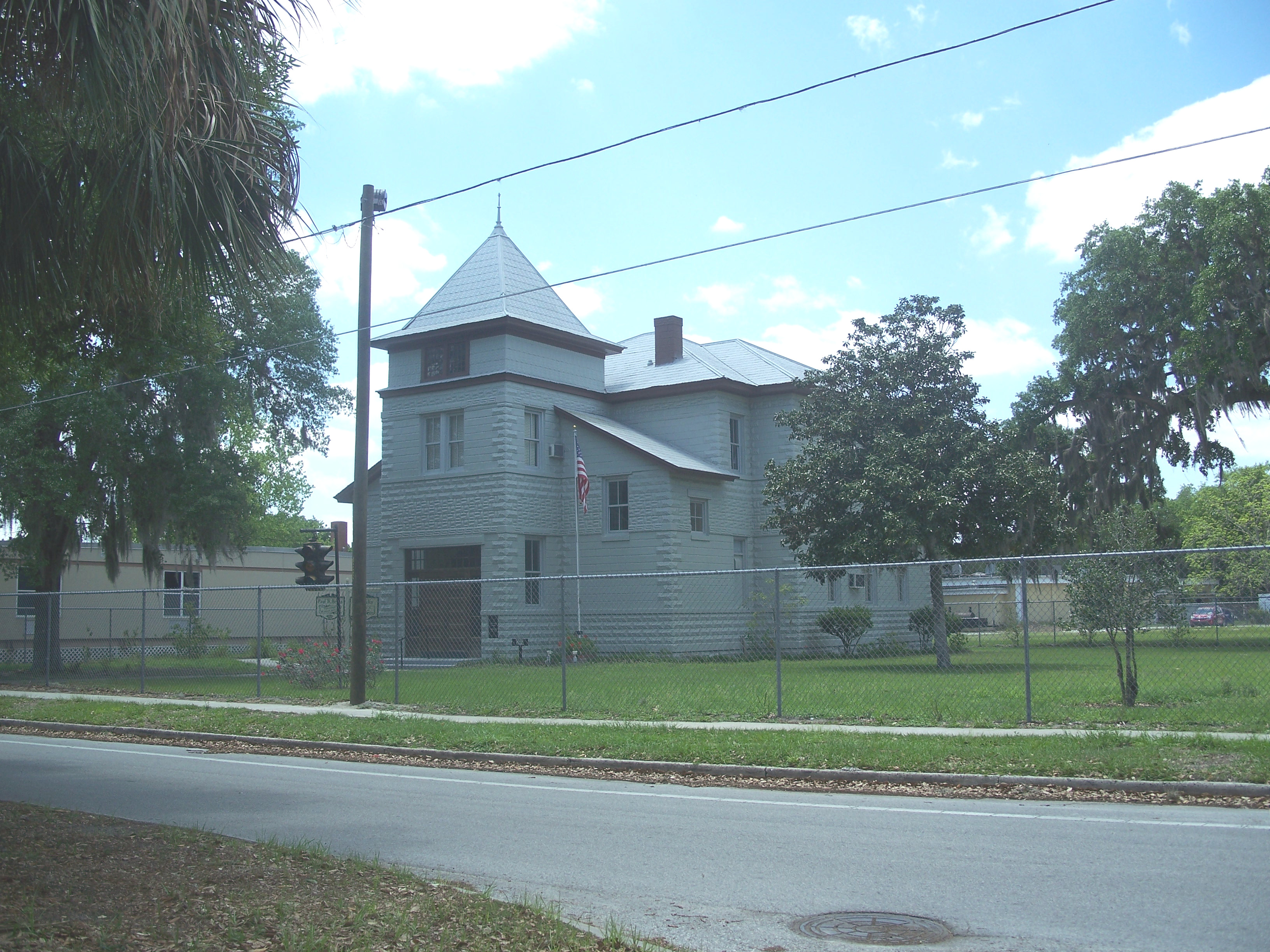
The original Umatilla High School, now known as the Paul W. Bryan Historic Schoolhouse and home to the Umatilla Historical Society Museum

Umatilla High School opened in 1910 as a junior high school and by 1912 had ten grades. The school was built for over $4,000 using funds from the Umatilla Special Tax District and was a two-story, five room concrete building. By 1914 Umatilla High School was considered an intermediate high school and between 1920 and 1922 became a senior high school.

Due to increasing enrollment a larger school was built in 1923 at a cost of $35,000. The original 1911 schoolbuilding is still standing, and is now known as the Paul W. Bryan Historic Schoolhouse and since 2002 has been the location of the Umatilla Historical Society Museum.

A new school was built between 1961 and 1962 with a new wing of the building constructed in 1967.

== Enrollment ==
As of the 2020–2021 school year, the school had an enrollment of 747 students and 40 full-time classroom teachers for a student–teacher ratio of 18.68. 325 of the students (or approximately 44% of the enrolled students) were eligible for free school meals, while none were eligible for reduced-price meals,

The AP participation rate is 59% and the graduation rate for the 2021–2022 school year was 91%.

== Academics ==
Since 1923 the school has been accrediated through the Southern Association of Colleges and Schools (SACS was later merged into AdvancED and is now called Cognia).

The school's cirriculum offers Teen Parent Program classes that teach relevant parenting and health materials to help prevent students from dropping out.

== Notable alumni ==
- Earl Inmon, former NFL linebacker for the Tampa Bay Buccaneers
- Jaclyn Stapp, American beauty queen, author, and actress
