= Tavares High School =

High school in Tavares, Florida, United States

Location
- 603 N. New Hampshire; Tavares, FL 32778; United States; 28.807°N 81.729°W

Information
- Type: Public
- Established: c. 1926
- School district: Lake County Schools
- Principal: Stacy Keaveny
- Faculty: 68.13 FTE
- Grades: 9 to 12
- Enrollment: 1,507 (2022-2023)
- Student to teacher ratio: 22.12
- Colors: Red, White
- Mascot: Bulldog
- Website: ths.lake.k12.fl.us/o/ths

Tavares High School is a high school located in Tavares, Florida, United States, and is one of seven public high schools operated by Lake County Schools in Lake County, Florida. The school was built in 1926 and originally housed grades 9 and 10. In 1927, grades 11 and 12 were added, making it a true high school. It is made up of approximately 2,000 students. The current principal is Jacob Stein

== Sports ==
- Baseball
- Basketball
- Bowling
- Cross country
- Football
- Golf
- Marching band
- Softball
- Swimming
- Track and field
- Tennis
- Volleyball
- Weightlifting

== Notable alumni ==
- Jermaine Taylor - Professional basketball player
- Brady Singer - Major League Baseball player
- Mark Kolozsvary - Major League Baseball player
