= Mark Kolozsvary =

American baseball player (born 1995)

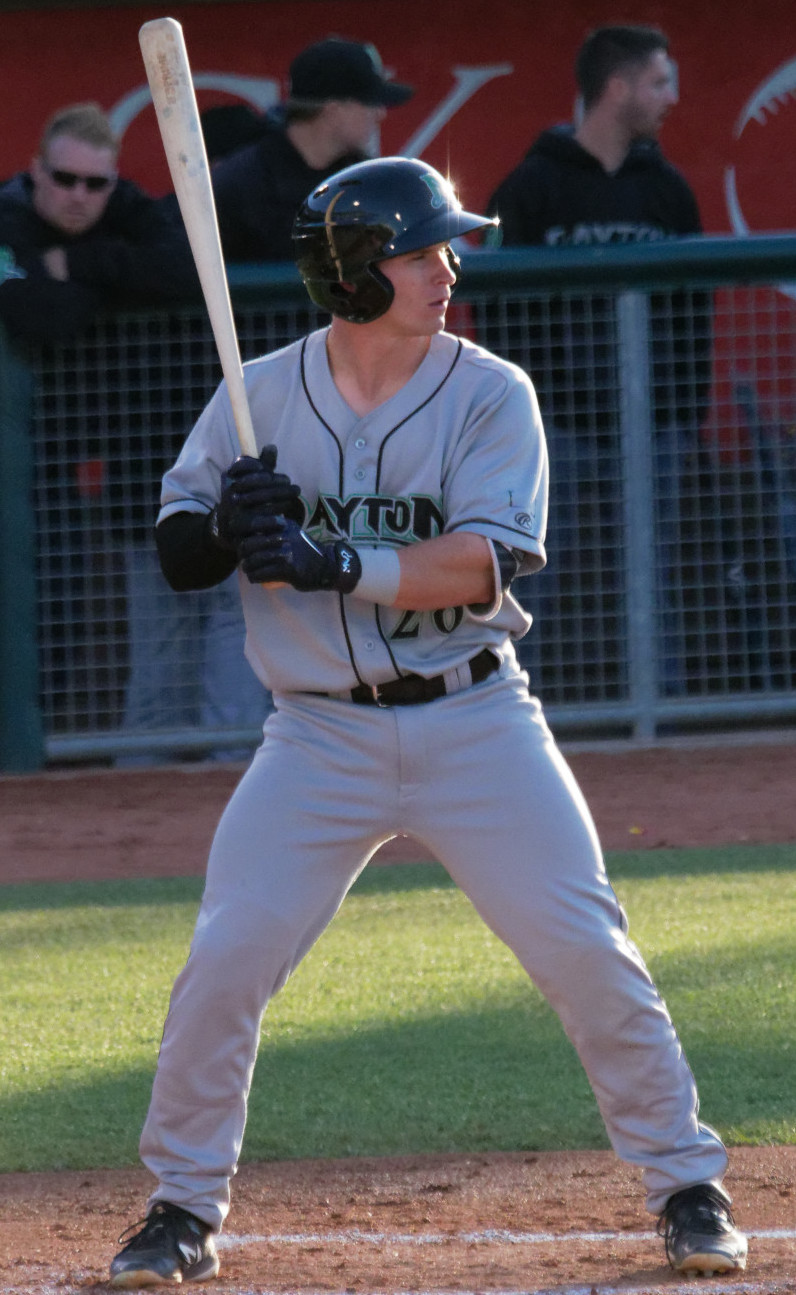
- Kolozsvary with the Dayton Dragons in 2018

Free agent
- Catcher
- Born: September 4, 1995 (age 31); Eustis, Florida, U.S.
- Bats: Right Throws: Right

MLB debut
- April 20, 2022, for the Cincinnati Reds

MLB statistics (through 2023 season)
- Batting average: .200
- Home runs: 1
- Runs batted in: 3
- Stats at Baseball Reference

Teams
- Cincinnati Reds (2022); Baltimore Orioles (2023)
Medals
Men's baseball
Representing United States
Olympic Games
Silver medal – second place	2020 Tokyo	Team

Mark Daniel Kolozsvary (/ˈkoʊloʊzvɑːriː/ KOH-lohz-var-ee; born September 4, 1995) is an American professional baseball catcher who is a free agent. He has previously played in Major League Baseball (MLB) for the Cincinnati Reds and Baltimore Orioles. He was drafted by the Reds in the seventh round of the 2017 MLB draft.

== Career ==
=== Amateur career ===
Kolozsvary attended Mount Dora Christian Academy in Mount Dora, Florida, and transferred to Tavares High School in Tavares, Florida, for his senior year. He enrolled at the University of Florida, where he played college baseball for the Florida Gators. With the Gators, he was a member of the 2017 College World Series (CWS). Kolozsvary had one plate appearance during the CWS, hitting a single off of Nick Lodolo.

=== Cincinnati Reds ===
The Cincinnati Reds selected Kolozsvary in the seventh round, 197th overall, of the 2017 MLB draft, and he signed with the team. He made his professional debut with the rookie-level Billings Mustangs, posting a .305/.362/.411 slash in 28 games. In 2018, Kolozsvary played for the Single-A Dayton Dragons, where he hit .225/.310/.324 with 3 home runs and 27 RBI. The following season, Kolozsvary received a promotion to the High-A Daytona Tortugas, and slashed .188/.341/.321 in 79 games with the team.

During the COVID-19 pandemic, which resulted in the cancellation of the 2020 minor league season, the Reds included Kolozsvary in their 60-man player pool at their alternate site, but did not see any game time in the major leagues. Kolozsvary was assigned to the Double-A Chattanooga Lookouts to begin the 2021 season. In August, the Reds promoted him to the Triple-A Louisville Bats. On September 20, 2021, Cincinnati selected Kolozsvary's contact and added him to the active roster, but he was optioned back on September 22 without making an appearance with the Reds.

Kolozsvary began the 2022 season with Chattanooga. He was selected to the 40-man roster and made his major league debut on April 20, appearing as a defensive substitute for the Reds. On April 28, Kolozsvary collected his first MLB hit and RBI, lacing a double off of San Diego Padres starter and former Team USA teammate Nick Martinez. On July 23, Kolozsvary hit his first career home run, a solo shot off of Junior Fernández of the St. Louis Cardinals.

=== Baltimore Orioles ===
On October 14, 2022, Kolozsvary was claimed off waivers by the Baltimore Orioles. On November 19, he was removed from the 40-man roster and sent outright to the Triple-A Norfolk Tides.

Kolozsvary was assigned to the Double–A Bowie Baysox to begin the 2023 season, and was quickly elevated to Triple–A Norfolk. In 20 games for Norfolk, he struggled to a .162/.250/.265 batting line with 2 home runs and 7 RBI. On June 13, 2023, Kolozsvary was selected to the major league roster after Ryan Mountcastle was placed on the injured list with vertigo. He appeared as a defensive replacement for Adley Rutschman in that day's game against the Toronto Blue Jays, and was optioned to Triple–A the following day. Kolozsvary was designated for assignment by the Orioles on June 14, following the promotion of Reed Garrett. On June 16, he cleared waivers and elected free agency in lieu of an outright assignment.

=== Minnesota Twins ===
On June 20, 2023, Kolozsvary signed a minor league contract with the Minnesota Twins. He played in six games for the Triple–A St. Paul Saints, going 3–for–14 (.214) with one home run and four RBI. Kolozsvary elected free agency following the season on November 6.

=== Boston Red Sox ===
On December 22, 2023, Kolozsvary signed a minor league contract with the Boston Red Sox. He played in 27 games for the Triple-A Worcester Red Sox in 2024, slashing .185/.349/.354 with three home runs, 10 RBI, and two stolen bases. Kolozsvary elected free agency following the season on November 4, 2024.

On January 23, 2025, Kolozsvary re-signed with the Red Sox on a new minor league contract. He made 30 appearances for Worcester and the Double-A Portland Sea Dogs, hitting .253/.336/.495 with five home runs and 17 RBI. On June 30, Kolozsvary was placed on the full-season injured list, ending his season. He elected free agency following the season on November 6.

=== Philadelphia Phillies ===
On December 26, 2025, Kolozsvary signed a minor league contract with the Philadelphia Phillies. In 18 games split between Single-A, High-A and Double-A he batted .185/.436/.370 with 3 home runs, 8 RBIs and one stolen base. He elected free agency on November 2.

== International career ==
Kolozsvary played for the United States national baseball team for qualifying for baseball at the 2020 Summer Olympics. After the team qualified, he was named to the Olympics roster on July 2. The team went on to win silver, falling to hosts Japan in the gold-medal game.

== Personal life ==
Kolozsvary's paternal grandfather was a Hungarian immigrant.
