= Historic Sanford Memorial Stadium =

Baseball stadium in Sanford, Florida

- Sanford Memorial Stadium
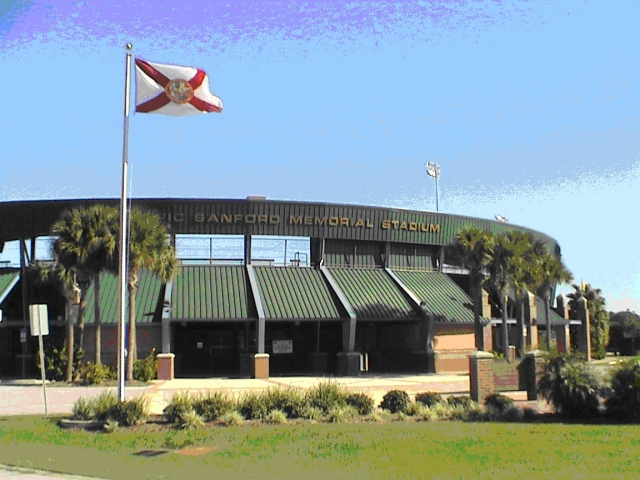
- Interactive map of Historic Sanford Memorial Stadium
- Location: 1201 S. Mellonville Avenue; Sanford, Florida 32771
- Coordinates: 28.80333°N 81.25485°W
- Owner: City of Sanford, Florida
- Capacity: 2,015

Construction
- Built: 1951
- Renovated: 2001

Tenants
- Sanford Babe Ruth Baseball; Sanford River Rats (FCSL) (2007–present); Seminole County Naturals (FWBL) (2009)

Historic Sanford Memorial Stadium is a baseball stadium located in Sanford, Florida. The ballpark is located just south of Lake Monroe on Mellonville Avenue, less than a mile from Historic Downtown Sanford. The stadium stands at the site of the old Sanford Field, which was originally built in 1926. The stadium was built on the old site in 1951 as the Spring Training Facility of the New York Giants. Many Major League stars have played in the stadium including Babe Ruth, Jackie Robinson, Willie Mays, Tim Raines, and David Eckstein. The Stadium was refurbished in 2001 at a cost of two million dollars, and now offers many modern amenities along with the classic architecture typical of stadiums built in the early to mid 1900s.

The Stadium is currently home to the Orlando Baseball Association (OBA), 25t, 35t and 45t leagues, as well as Sanford Babe Ruth Baseball and the Sanford River Rats of the Florida Collegiate Summer League. It was also home to the Seminole County Naturals of the Florida Winter Baseball League during the 2009 season; the league subsequently suspended operations during the season due to a lack of funding. The stadium previously served as a spring training facility for the New York Giants and Atlanta Braves. In 1942, the Boston Braves used the old field as its primary facility.

Sanford Stadium is the location where Jackie Robinson first took to the field in 1946 to play baseball as a member of a white Class AAA International League Team in Daytona Beach, Florida, which was partnered with the Montreal Royals. Unfortunately, this was also during an era of racial segregation and racial tensions, especially in that part of the Southern United States which made up the former Confederacy. By the time Robinson took the field, the crowd of local white citizens in the stands ended up booing him off the field and he was not able to play. The then-Sanford police chief had actually threatened to cancel the game if Robinson took the field.

On April 20, 1997, fifty years after Robinson had broken the color barrier in major league baseball, Mayor Larry Dale of Sanford issued a proclamation honoring Jackie Robinson and apologizing for the City of Sanford's, "...regrettable actions in 1946," when the city forced Robinson off Municipal Athletic Field. However, per author Chris Lamb's book, Blackout: The Untold Story of Jackie Robinson's First Spring Training, despite the passage of over half a century, Mayor Dale's proclamation still didn't sit well with all residents of Sanford, especially those long-time residents or their descendants who were present or traced their lineage back to the city in 1946. Many believed that the city had let Robinson play and therefore had no reason to apologize, while others saw no reason to dredge up the sins of the past.

== Stadium features ==
The ballpark features 415 box seats and bleacher seating for 1600 putting the total capacity at 2,015. The block outfield wall is 330 feet down the lines and 385 feet to center field. There are also two locker rooms, batting cages and bullpens for both home and visiting teams. There is a fully operational concession stand in the concourse area, along with the Buddy Lake Community Room, which offers food and beverage choices for fans and players. The press box is air conditioned, with phone and data lines, public address system and scoreboard controls.

Sanford Memorial Stadium is a non-smoking facility. No coolers, food, pets or weapons of any kind are permitted inside the Stadium.
