= Florida Winter Baseball League =

- Sport: Baseball
- Founded: 2009
- No. of teams: 4
- Country: USA
- Website: fwbl.com This domain is not valid in USA. (controversy)

The Florida Winter Baseball League, based in Miami, Florida, is a professional baseball organization located in Florida. It is based in Pompano Beach, Florida.

== History ==
The Florida Winter Baseball League (FWBL) was a professional sports league, which began its inaugural season in October 2009.

The FWBL was a four team league which planned to play a 60-game schedule through the winter months in various Floridian markets. It was planned to feature players from the low levels of the minors, rookie leagues and A ball. The league featured teams from Cocoa, Miami, Lake County and Seminole County.

The FWBL suspended operations on November 18, 2009 after completing 25% of its inaugural season, or 15 games. The organization did not raise all of the initial startup capital it required. The poorly run league had trouble paying the players and reports existed of player paychecks bouncing.

A separate league, called Florida Winter League Baseball, featuring overlooked college players or released pro players is scheduled to open in January 2012. It is unclear if the leagues have any connection other than similar names.

A league by this name resurfaced in 2015 and featured four teams: The Broward Waverunners, the Collier County Loggerheads, the Miami-Dade Red Snappers and the Palm Beach Spoonbills. It is based in Pompano Beach, Florida.

League commissioner Jamie Siragusa had been a player in the independent Empire State League in 1987 and reorganized the FWBL in 2015, following the Empire State League's single complex format.

== Teams ==
Team	City	Stadium
Miami Diamantes	Miami, Florida	University Park Stadium
Lake County Black Bears	Leesburg, Florida	Pat Thomas Stadium
Seminole County Naturals	Sanford, Florida	Historic Sanford Memorial Stadium
Space Coast Surge	Cocoa, Florida	Cocoa Expo Sports Center

== 2015–2016 season ==
The season was completed. Miami-Dade Red Snappers Won FWBL Championship 2015

Team	Win	Loss	Ties	Games
Miami Dade Red Snappers	11	2	1	14
Broward Waverunners	6	8	1	15
Collier County Loggerheads	6	8	0	14
Palm Beach Spoonbills	5	10	0	15

== 2009–2010 season ==
The season was incomplete and interrupted after 30 games played

Team	Win	Loss	Streak
Lake County Black Bears	11	4	W3
Seminole County Naturals	9	6	W5
Miami Diamantes	8	7	L3
Space Coast Surge	2	13	L5
