= Lake County Schools =

School district in Florida, United States

Location
- Lake County, Florida United States

District information
- Type: Public school district
- Grades: Pre-K to 12
- Superintendent: Diane Kornegay

Students and staff
- Students: 48,285
- Teachers: 2,696 (on FTE basis)

Other information
- Student:teacher ratio: 17.91
- Website: www.lake.k12.fl.us

Lake County Schools is a public school district located in Lake County, Florida, U.S.. The district operates 49 schools, including 20 elementary schools, 9 middle schools, 8 high schools. The district educates over 48,200 students in pre-kindergarten through twelfth grade.

As of 2017, the superintendent is Diane Kornegay, M.Ed.

== Elementary schools ==
- Astatula Elementary
- Aurelia M. Cole Academy (Pre-K - 8th grade)
- Beverly Shores Elementary
- Cypress Ridge Elementary
- Eustis Elementary
- Eustis Heights Elementary
- Fruitland Park Elementary
- Grassy Lake Elementary
- Groveland Elementary
- Lake Pointe Academy (Pre-K - 8th grade)
- Leesburg Elementary
- Lost Lake Elementary
- Pine Ridge Elementary
- Rimes Early Learning Center (Pre-K - 2nd grade)
- Sawgrass Bay Elementary
- Seminole Springs Elementary
- Sorrento Elementary
- Tavares Elementary
- Treadway Elementary
- Triangle Elementary
- Umatilla Elementary
- Villages Elementary of Lady Lake

== Middle schools ==
- Aurelia M. Cole Academy (Pre-K - 8th grade)
- Carver Middle
- Cecil E. Gray Middle
- East Ridge Middle
- Eustis Middle
- Lake Pointe Academy (Pre-K - 8th grade)
- Mount Dora Middle
- Oak Park Middle
- Tavares Middle
- Umatilla Middle
- Windy Hill Middle

== High schools ==
- East Ridge High (Knight)
- Eustis High (Panther)
- Lake Minneola High (Hawk)
- Leesburg High (Yellow Jacket)
- Mount Dora High (Hurricane)
- South Lake High (Eagle)
- Tavares High (Bulldog)
- Umatilla High (Bulldog)

== Conversion charter schools ==
- Mascotte Charter
- Minneola Charter
- Round Lake Charter
- Spring Creek Charter

== Other schools ==
- Academy of Lake Hills South
- Lake County Virtual School
- Lake Hills School
- Lake Success Academy
- Lake Success Elementary
- Lincoln Park Education Center
