= Pat Thomas Stadium =

Baseball stadium in Leesburg, Florida

Pat Thomas Stadium-Buddy Lowe Field
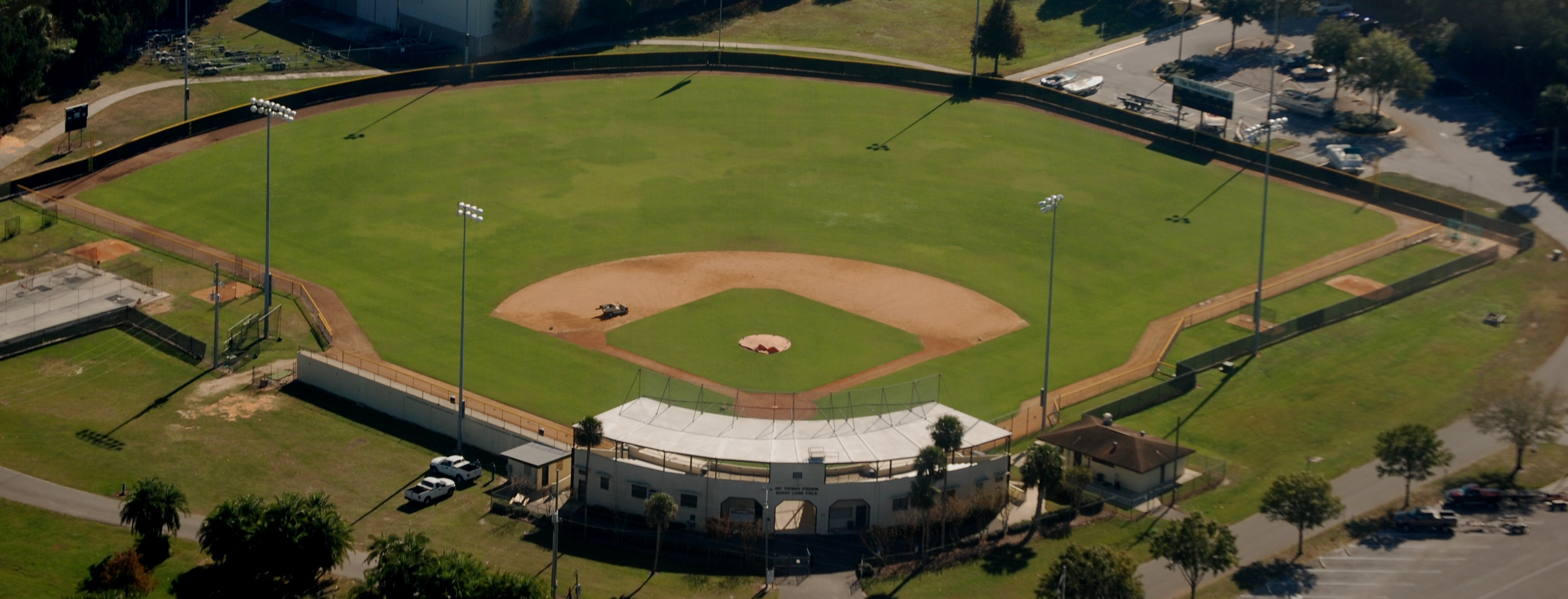
- Interactive map of Pat Thomas Stadium-Buddy Lowe Field
- Full name: Buddy Lowe Field at Pat Thomas Stadium
- Former names: Pat Thomas Stadium (1972–2003); The Ballpark at Venetian Gardens (1937–1972)
- Location: 240 Ball Park Road; Leesburg, Florida
- Coordinates: 28.80546°N 81.87265°W
- Owner: City of Leesburg
- Capacity: Baseball – 4,000
- Surface: Grass
- Field size: Left Field: 325ft Center Field: 375ft Right Field: 325ft

Construction
- Opened: 1937
- Expanded: 1940
- Cost: $44,000 (NOTE: Including a $25,000 expansion in 1940)

Tenants
- Rochester Red Wings (AA) Spring training (1937); Leesburg Gondoliers (FSL) (1937–1938); Leesburg Anglers (FSL) (1938–1941) (1946); Philadelphia Phillies Minor League spring training (1946–1968); Leesburg Pirates (FSL) (1947–1948); Leesburg Dodgers (FSL) (1949); Leesburg Packers (FSL) (1950–1952); Leesburg Lakers (FSL) (1953); Leesburg Braves (FSL) (1956–1957); Leesburg Orioles (FSL) (1960–1961); Leesburg A's (FSL) (1965–1968); Leesburg Lightning (FCSL) (2007–present); Lake County Black Bears (FWBL) (2009)

Pat Thomas Stadium-Buddy Lowe Field is a baseball stadium located in Leesburg, Florida. The Stadium has a capacity of about 2,000 people and was a former minor league baseball stadium and current amateur baseball stadium. The park was the first lighted baseball stadium in Florida and home to several minor and major league spring training camps. The stadium is located in the city's Venetian Gardens, on the shore of Lake Harris.

== Stadium history ==
The stadium was built in 1937 as the Ballpark at Venetian Gardens, with the first game held on March 21, 1937. From 1937–1938 was the home of the Leesburg Gondoliers a Florida State League team that did not share an affiliation with a big-league club. From 1939–1941 it would host the Leesburg Anglers of the FSL, who again were a non-affiliated minor league team. After not hosting a team from 1942–1945 the Anglers would return in 1946. Around this same time the Philadelphia Phillies started to host their Minor League spring training camps at the stadium. From 1947–1948 the stadium would play host to the Leesburg Pirates, who were a Single A affiliate of the Pittsburgh Pirates. In 1949 the Brooklyn Dodgers would use the stadium to play host to the Leesburg Dodgers. From 1950–1952 they would again become an un-affiliated team known as the Leesburg Packers. In 1953 the team would change its name to the Leesburg Lakers but would remain independent of any affiliation. The team would go on hiatus for two seasons and would then emerge in 1956 as an affiliate of the Milwaukee Braves, known as the Leesburg Braves. They would remain that way until the end of the 1957 season. After that, they would become the Leesburg Orioles from 1960–1961 and were affiliated with the Baltimore Orioles. Again breaking for a few years the team would re-emerge for a final time, this time as the Leesburg A's from 1965–1968, they would be an affiliate of the Kansas City/Oakland A's during this stint. In 1968 the Phillies would also finally move their minor league spring training away from Leesburg and the stadium as well. On March 11, 1972 the field was renamed Pat Thomas Stadium, in honor of the former Leesburg City Manager, who served for 13 years and was a big supporter of baseball in Leesburg. The stadium is renamed again in 2003, Buddy Lowe Field at Pat Thomas Stadium, in honor of the high school's baseball coach Buddy Lowe.

Although the Stadium had no permanent residents for quite some time, it would play the occasional host to major league exhibition games. The stadium would lie dormant for about 35 years, primarily hosting Leesburg High School and Lake–Sumter Community College games. However, thanks to City efforts not letting the Stadium deteriorate it was able to become the home of the Leesburg Lightning of the Florida Collegiate Summer League in 2007. The Lightning, coached by former Cy Young Award winner Frank Viola have been a huge success, drawing near sellout crowds. The Stadium was also the home of the Lake County Black Bears in the inaugural season of the Florida Winter Baseball League. Unfortunately, the league would fold after only about 1/4 of the season taking place.
