= Belleview Bulldogs =

Former American collegiate baseball team

Information
- League: FCSL
- Location: Ocala, Florida
- Ballpark: Ocala Rotary Sportsplex
- Founded: 2008
- Runners-up championships: 2008
- Colors: Blue, Orange
- Management: Bob Dobkowski, John Ragasta
- Manager: Ricky Plante

Current uniforms
Home	Away

The Belleview Bulldogs were a wood bat collegiate summer baseball league team located in Ocala, Florida. The team was a member of the Florida Collegiate Summer League (FCSL) and played its home games at the Ocala Rotary Sportsplex. The team joined the FCSL in the 2008 season. The franchise was disbanded following its inaugural 2008 season.

== History ==
The Bulldogs joined the FCSL in 2008 as an expansion team, one of three franchises joining the league that year. This brought the total number of FCSL franchises to six. In their inaugural season, the Bulldogs reached the FCSL championship game at Tropicana Field. However, they were defeated by the Clermont Mavericks 9-1.

== Playoff Appearances ==
Year	First round	Semifinals (best-of-3)		FCSL championship game	
2008	BYE	Winter Park Diamond Dawgs	W (2-0)	Clermont Mavericks	L (1-9)
