= Winter Park Diamond Dawgs =

Collegiate summer baseball team in Florida

Information
- League: FCSL
- Location: Winter Park, Florida
- Ballpark: Alfond Stadium
- Founded: 2004
- League championships: 6 (2006, 2010, 2013, 2014, 2019, 2022)
- Colors: Red, Dark Blue, white
- Manager: Cheryl Lacey

Current uniforms
Home	Away

The Winter Park Diamond Dawgs are a wood bat collegiate summer baseball league team located in Winter Park, Florida. The team is a member of the Florida Collegiate Summer League (FCSL) and plays its home games at Alfond Stadium. The team is an inaugural member of the FCSL.

== History ==
The Winter Park Diamond Dawgs and the Sanford River Rats were two of the inaugural teams of the FCSL. The team did not qualify for the championship game in 2004 or 2005. In 2006, however, the team won the FCSL championship game 4-3 over the Altamonte Springs Snappers. The team finished fourth in the league in both 2007 and 2008, not qualifying for the championship game in either season.

== Playoff appearances ==
Year	First round		Semifinals (best-of-3)		FCSL championship game	
2004			Double-Elimination	L (0-4), W (1-0), L (5-10)		
2006			Double-Elimination	L (4-6), W (4-2), W (4-2)	Altamonte Springs Snappers	W (4-3)
2007			Double-Elimination	L (3-6), L (2-3)		
2008	Orlando Suns	W (5-4)	Belleview Bulldogs	L (10-15)		
2010			Orlando Mavericks	W (10-2), W (8-2)	Leesburg Lightning	W (1-0)
2011			DeLand Suns	W (3-2), L (4-1), W (6-2)	Sanford River Rats	L (7-5)
2012			DeLand Suns	L (4-3), W (8-0), L (8-7)		
2013			Orlando Monarchs	W (6-2), W (19-7)	Leesburg Lightning	W (3-0)
2014			Winter Garden Squeeze	L (5-4), W (8-1), W (5-1)	Sanford River Rats	W (6-4)
2015	DeLand Suns	W (2-1)	Sanford River Rats	W (4-0), L (9-5), L (13-5)		
