= Florida Collegiate Summer League =

American collegiate summer baseball league

- Sport: Baseball
- Founded: 2003
- Motto: Pure Baseball
- No. of teams: 6
- Country: United States
- Most recent champion: Orlando Snappers (2025)
- Most titles: Winter Park Diamond Dawgs (6)
- Website: www.floridaleague.com

The Florida Collegiate Summer League (FCSL) is a six-team wood bat collegiate summer baseball league located in the Central Florida region of the southeastern United States. The league was founded in the fall of 2003 and began play in the summer of 2004. It is a 501(c)(3) non-profit organization whose mission is to "advance college players toward their futures in professional baseball." 360 players have been drafted in the first thirteen seasons including 33 in the 2016 MLB Draft. FCSL has had 16 alumni play in Major League Baseball, including New York Mets pitcher Jacob deGrom, Milwaukee Brewers catcher Jonathan Lucroy, Miami Marlins second baseman Dee Gordon, Colorado Rockies pitcher Mike McClendon, Milwaukee Brewers pitcher Jimmy Nelson, and San Francisco Giants pitcher Chris Heston. The FCSL is one of twelve leagues in the National Alliance of College Summer Baseball.

== Teams ==
Team	City	Stadium	Head Coach
Orlando Snappers	Orlando, Florida	Lake Highland Preparatory School	Terry Abbott
DeLand Suns	DeLand, Florida	Melching Field at Conrad Park (Stetson University)	Cameron Jergens
Leesburg Lightning	Leesburg, Florida	Pat Thomas Stadium	Rich Billings
Sanford River Rats	Sanford, Florida	Historic Sanford Memorial Stadium	Jesse Litsch
Winter Garden Squeeze	Winter Garden, Florida	Olympia High School	Mike McDaniel
Winter Park Diamond Dawgs	Winter Park, Florida	Alfond Stadium	Jim Newlin

Timeline of Teams

League members Future members

== Alumni (top-five round picks and notables) ==
Player	FCSL Team	Years Played	Year Drafted	Round	MLB team
Mike McClendon*	Winter Park	2006	2006	10th	Milwaukee Brewers
Corey Brown*	Orlando Shockers	2006	2007	1st	Oakland Athletics
Jonathan Lucroy*	Sanford	2005–06	2007	3rd	Milwaukee Brewers
Alan Farina	Orlando Shockers	2005	2007	3rd	Toronto Blue Jays
Jonathan Holt	Leesburg	2006-07	2007	5th	Cleveland Indians
Johnny Monell*	Winter Park	2006	2007	30th	San Francisco Giants
Dee Gordon*	Belleview	2008	2008	4th	Los Angeles Dodgers
Mycal Jones	Leesburg	2007-08	2009	4th	Atlanta Braves
Kent Matthes	Winter Pines	2008	2009	4th	Colorado Rockies
Thomas Berryhill	DeLand	2008	2009	5th	Atlanta Braves
Jimmy Nelson*	DeLand	2009	2010	2nd	Milwaukee Brewers
Dante Bichette, Jr.	Winter Park	2011	2011	1st	New York Yankees
Peter O'Brien	DeLand	2010	2012	2nd	New York Yankees
Brandon Thomas	Sanford	2010	2012	4th	Pittsburgh Pirates
Tucker Donahue	Winter Park	2010	2012	4th	Toronto Blue Jays
Myles Smith	DeLand	2011	2013	4th	Boston Red Sox
Zane Evans	Leesburg	2011	2013	4th	Kansas City Royals
Aaron Slegers	Orlando	2012	2013	5th	Minnesota Twins
Ian McKinney	Winter Park	2013	2013	5th	St. Louis Cardinals

(*) = Reached the Major Leagues

== Champions ==
Year	Winning team	Runs	Losing team	Runs
2004	Sanford River Rats	10	Daytona Beach Barracudas	0
2005	Zephyrhills Snappers	2	Sanford River Rats	1
2006	Winter Park Diamond Dawgs	4	Altamonte Springs Snappers	3
2007	Leesburg Lightning	6	Altamonte Springs Snappers	0
2008	Clermont Mavericks	9	Belleview Bulldogs	1
2009	Leesburg Lightning	5	Clermont Mavericks	1
2010	Winter Park Diamond Dawgs	1	Leesburg Lightning	0
2011	Sanford River Rats	7	Winter Park Diamond Dawgs	5
2012	DeLand Suns	10	Leesburg Lightning	7
2013	Winter Park Diamond Dawgs	3	Leesburg Lightning	0
2014	Winter Park Diamond Dawgs	6	Sanford River Rats	4
2015	Sanford River Rats	1	Leesburg Lightning	0
2016	Altamonte Springs Boom	6	Sanford River Rats	5
2017	Sanford River Rats	6	Winter Park Diamond Dawgs	5
2018	DeLand Suns	12	Winter Park Diamond Dawgs	1
2019	Winter Park Diamond Dawgs	4	DeLand Suns	0
2020	Sanford River Rats	6	Leesburg Lightning	3
2021	Leesburg Lightning	9	Winter Park Diamond Dawgs	1
2022	Winter Park Diamond Dawgs	11	Leesburg Lightning	3
2023	Leesburg Lightning	7	Winter Garden Squeeze	2
2024	Leesburg Lightning	3	DeLand Suns	2
2025	Orlando Snappers	11	Sanford River Rats	6

== Award winners ==
Year	MVP	Cy Young	Best Pro Prospect
2004	Kyle Patrick, Sanford	Drew Shetrone, Sanford	N/A
2005	Lee Cruz, Zephyrhills	Ty Pryor, Winter Park	N/A
2006	Anthony Ottrando, Altamonte Springs	Ryan Horton, Winter Park	Jonathan Lucroy, Winter Park
2007	Tyler McCarty, Winter Springs	John Durham, Altamonte Springs	Aaron Tullo, Winter Park
2008	Andy Mee, Belleview	Bo O'Dell, Belleview	Jeff Walters, Winter Park
2009	Anthony Figliolia, Winter Park	Trey Ferrano, Sanford	Jabari Blash, DeLand
2010	LB Dantzler, Winter Park	Bobby Bolling, Winter Park	Brandon Thomas, Sanford
2011	Ted Blackman, Winter Park	Ben Brown, Winter Park	Garrett Nuss, Orlando
2012	Michael Danner, Winter Park	Evan Incinelli, Winter Park	David Lee, Orlando
2013	Tyler Palmer, Sanford	Emilio Ogando, Winter Park	Tyler Palmer, Sanford
2014	Austin Hays	Arturo Martoral	Austin Hays
2015	Santiago Espinal	Brett Morales	Austin Glorius
2016	Harrison Scanlon	Jarred Neal	Carlos Cortes
2017	Sadler Goodwin	David Litchfield	Garrett Zech
2018	Aaron Anderson	Vlad Nunez	Zebulon Vermillion
2019	Mark Townsend	Jack Wolgast	Gunnar Hoglund
2020	Lucas Dunn	Parker Messick	Dylan Crews
2021	Josh Pearson	Gerry Kelly	Sterlin Thompson
2022	Jeff Liquori	Jacob Burr	Brody Danay
2023	Gabriel Santiago	Jacob Burr	Connor Hujsak
2024	Titan Kamaka	Micah Takac	Collin Priest
2025	Dawson Mock	Ryland Bozenhard	Blake Fields

== Celebrity golf tournament ==
Every November, the Florida League hosts a celebrity golf tournament at Interlachen Country Club in Winter Park, FL. Money raised from the event helps fund the League throughout the year. The weekend-long event includes a hitting & pitching clinic for kids, a catered pairings dinner, a meet-and-greet with the celebrities, a silent auction and the round of golf. Celebrity appearances have been made by dozens of current and former MLB players including: Davey Johnson, Frank Viola, Hunter Pence, José Bautista, Ray Lankford, Gary Carter, Fred McGriff, Jeff Bagwell, B.J. Upton, Tim Wakefield, Zack Greinke, Andrew McCutchen, Tim Raines, Vince Coleman and many others.

== High school invitational ==
In an effort to reach out to baseball players of all levels, the FCSL also hosts multiple spring break tournaments during the month of March. All games are held at Historic Sanford Memorial Stadium in Sanford, FL. These tournaments, known as the Florida High School Invitational, bring in teams from all over the United States. The 2013 tournament featured twenty-three teams from across the country. Notable prospects who have participated in the FHSI include Albert Almora (#6 overall pick, 2012, Chicago Cubs), Dante Bichette, Jr. (1st round pick, 2011, New York Yankees), Francisco Lindor (#8 overall pick, 2011, Cleveland Indians), Javier Baez (#9 overall pick, 2011, Chicago Cubs), Greg Bird (5th round, 2011, New York Yankees), Tomas Nido (8th round, 2012, New York Mets), Chris Okey (All-American), and Touki Toussaint (All-American).

Year	Champion	Location
2008	St. Cloud Bulldogs	St. Cloud, FL
2009	All Saints Academy Saints	Winter Haven, FL
2010	Timber Creek Wolves	Orlando, FL
2011 (Week 1)	Timber Creek Wolves	Orlando, FL
2011 (Week 2)	Bryant Hornets	Bryant, AR
2012	Palm Beach Gardens Gators	Palm Beach Gardens, FL
2013 (Classic)	Lake Brantley Patriots	Altamonte Springs, FL
2013 (Showcase)	Seminole Seminoles	Sanford, FL
