= Sanford River Rats =

Collegiate summer baseball team in Florida

Information
- League: FCSL
- Location: Sanford, Florida
- Ballpark: Historic Sanford Memorial Stadium
- Founded: 2004
- League championships: 3 (2004, 2011, 2015)
- Colors: Blue, White
- Mascot: Ralphie
- General manager: Michael Lieberman

Current uniforms
Home	Away

The Sanford River Rats are a wood bat collegiate summer baseball league team located in Sanford, Florida. The team is a member of the Florida Collegiate Summer League (FCSL) and plays its home games at Historic Sanford Memorial Stadium. The team is an inaugural member of the FCSL.

== History ==
The River Rats were one of the inaugural teams of the FCSL. The team won the FCSL championship in the league's inaugural 2004 season and was the runner-up in the following 2005 season. After that, the team went into a bit of a slide, finishing fifth in 2006, fifth in 2007, and sixth in 2008.

In 2009, the Rats finished with a 23–17 record, good enough for a 2nd-place finish. On offense, they tied for the league lead in home runs (19) and led the league with a whopping 93 stolen bases. Jordan Yost led the team with a league high 7 HR and 35 RBI. On the defensive side, the Rats led the league in team ERA (3.50) and fielding percentage (.962). Pitcher Bryan Brown tied for the league lead in wins (5) and was 2nd in strikeouts with 52. The #2 seed Rats lost in a three-game series to the Belleview Bulldogs in the playoffs that year.

2010 brought on a change in regime as Davey Johnson was hired to be the head coach. His professional demeanor took a very talented Rats roster to a 28–13 record, good for 2nd place in the league. On offense, they finished first in the league in triples, walks and steals. College teammates Kelvin Clark (.333 avg, 1 HR, 21 RBI, 31 runs) and Tyler Benzel (.321 avg, 3 HR, 26 RBI, 32 runs), both from Florida Southern University, led the team at the plate. The pitching staff led the league in WHIP (1.32), opponent average (.232) and ERA (3.44). Starting pitcher Jeremy Strawn led the team in wins (4), innings pitched (46.1), and ERA (1.75). The season ended in disappointment however, as the Leesburg Lightning swept the Rats in the playoffs semifinals two games to zero.

After Johnson took the manager position with the Washington Nationals, the Rats turned to Steve Piercefield to lead them in the 2011 season. The regular season was a roller coaster of good play and poor effort. Entering the last week of the season, the Rats were in last place in the standings. After finishing 5–2 in the last week of the season, they earned the 4th seed with a 16–22 record.

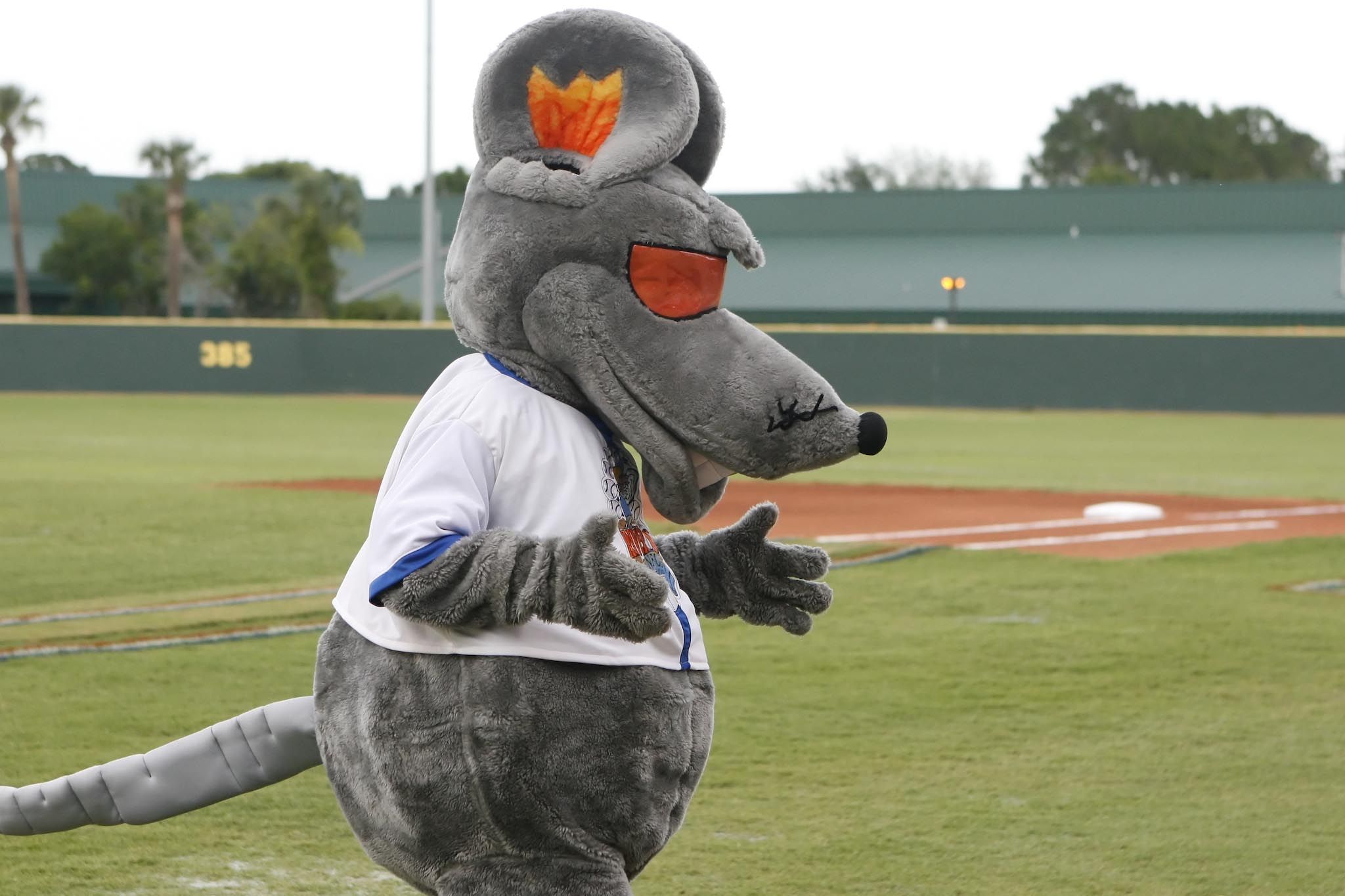
Ralphie the River Rat

Offensively, they were led by University of South Florida teammates Alex Mendez (.326 avg, 1 HR, 12 RBI, 28 runs) and James Ramsay (.326 avg, 1 HR, 11 RBI, 13 runs). In the play-in game of the playoffs, the Rats defeated the Orlando Freedom 12-2. This put them into a three-game series vs. the #1 seed Leesburg Lightning. After losing game 1 by a score of 2-1, the Rats were able to score two runs in the bottom of the 11th with 2 outs to take game 2 by a score of 4-3. They went on to win game 3 in Leesburg by a score of 9-2. This put them in the championship game vs. the #2 seed Winter Park Diamond Dawgs. After giving up four runs in the first inning, the Rats were able to put together an incredible comeback, winning the game 7-5. James Ramsay was named the championship game MVP. On October 10, 2011 the city of Sanford presented the River Rats with the key to the city and proclaimed that day to be "Sanford River Rats Day".

== Playoff Appearances ==
Year	First round		Semifinals (best-of-3)		FCSL championship game	
2004			Double-Elimination	W (4-0), W (5-3)	Daytona Beach Barracudas	W (10-0)
2005			Double-Elimination	W (5-3), L (8-1), W(3-2)	Zephyrhills Snappers	L (1-2)
2006			Double-Elimination	W (6-0), L (1-5), L (2-4)		
2008	Leesburg Lightning	L (1-3)				
2009			Belleview Bulldogs	(0-2)		
2010			Leesburg Lightning	L (3-0), L (9-8)		
2011	Orlando Freedom	W (12-2)	Leesburg Lightning	L (2-1), W (4-3), W (9-2)	Winter Park Diamond Dawgs	W (7-5)
2012	Orlando Monarchs	W (8-3)	Leesburg Lightning	L (14-8), W (8-7), L (5-1)		
2013			Leesburg Lightning	L (1-0), L (6-4)		
2014			Leesburg Lightning	W (15-3), W (8-4)	Winter Park Diamond Dawgs	L (6-4)
2015			Winter Park Diamond Dawgs	W (4-0), L (9-5), W (13-5)	Leesburg Lightning	W (1-0)

== The Fans: Rowdy Rats ==
A part of knowing the Sanford River Rats is knowing the fan club known as the "Rowdy Rats." The Rowdy Rats have been a group that has been attending the games since the summer of 2015. The fan group has no affiliation with the team or anyone on the team but it doesn't stop them from coming to games. When asked why they come, Jake Uttich, Co-founding member said "I don't know man, I just love coming out, watching baseball and talking trash. There isn't much out there like it." To show its appreciation, on June 16 of 2015, The River Rats gave free admission to everyone in the fan group. The fan group takes up over half of the crowd population with its 15+ members and seldom misses games.
