= Lisbon, Florida =

- Census-designated place
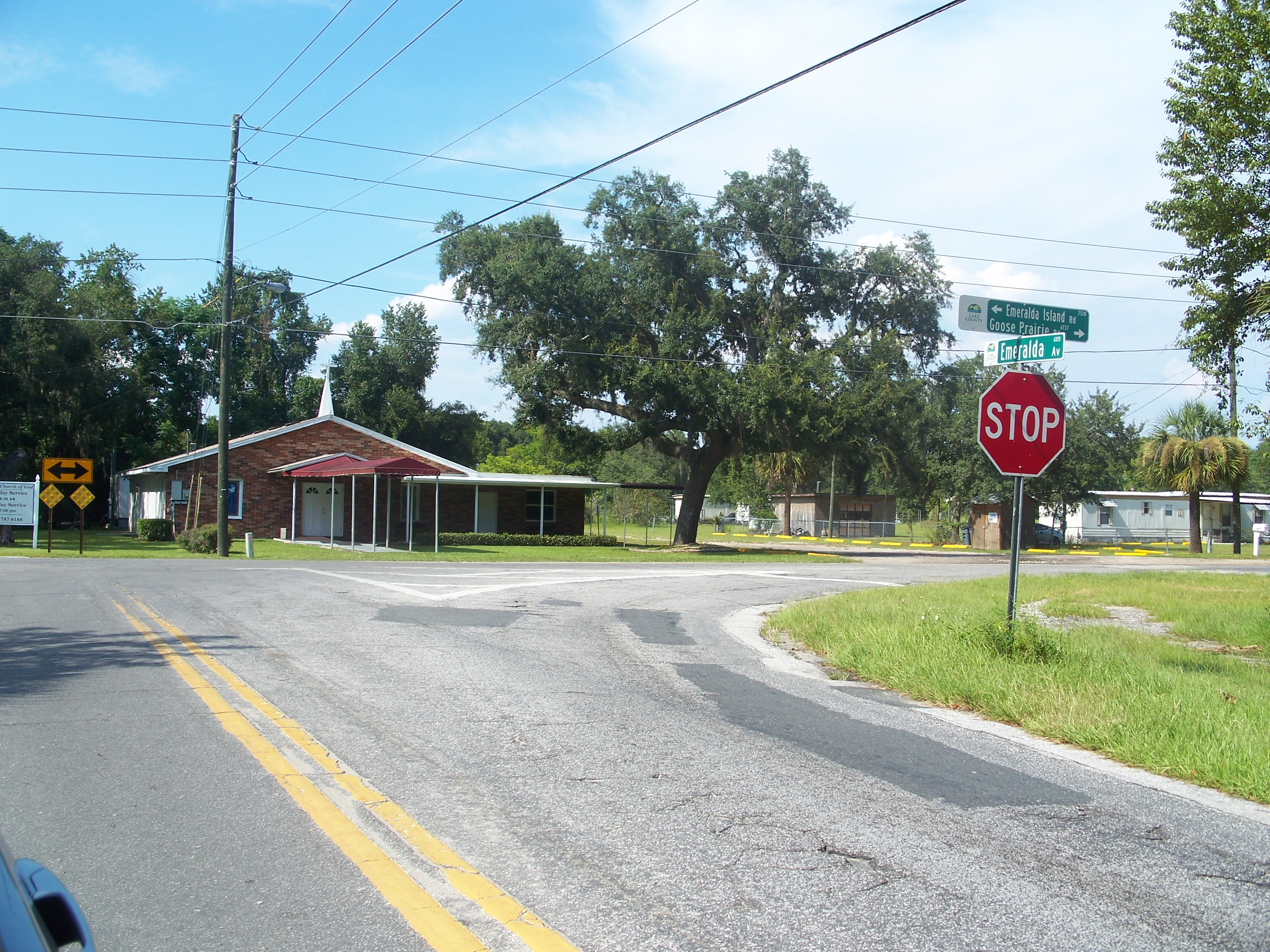
- Intersection of Emeralda Avenue and Emeralda Island Road/Goose Prairie Road

- Location in Lake County and the state of Florida
- Coordinates: 28°52′40″N 81°46′47″W
- Country: United States
- State: Florida
- County: Lake

Area
  - Total: 1.93 sq mi (5.01 km^{2})
  - Land: 1.79 sq mi (4.64 km^{2})
  - Water: 0.14 sq mi (0.37 km^{2})
- Elevation: 69 ft (21 m)

Population (2020)
  - Total: 229
  - Density: 127.7/sq mi (49.32/km^{2})
- Time zone: UTC-5 (Eastern (EST))
  - Summer (DST): UTC-4 (EDT)
- ZIP code: 34788
- Area code: 352
- FIPS code: 12-40750
- GNIS feature ID: 2403236

Lisbon is an unincorporated community and census-designated place (CDP) in Lake County, Florida, United States. As of the 2020 census, Lisbon had a population of 229. It is part of the Orlando–Kissimmee Metropolitan Statistical Area.

== Geography ==
Lisbon is located in central Lake County in an area between Lake Yale to the northeast, Lake Eustis to the southeast, and Lake Griffin to the southwest. It is 8 miles (13 km) northwest of Tavares, the Lake county seat, 8 miles west of Eustis, and 8 miles northeast of Leesburg.

According to the United States Census Bureau, the CDP has a total area of 1.9 square miles (4.9 km^{2}), of which 1.7 square miles (4.5 km^{2}) are land and 0.2 square miles (0.4 km^{2}), or 7.63%, are water.

Lisbon has low rolling landscape with elevations ranging from 30 to 60 feet.

=== Climate ===
Climate data for Lisbon, Florida, 1991–2020 normals, extremes 1958–present
Month	Jan	Feb	Mar	Apr	May	Jun	Jul	Aug	Sep	Oct	Nov	Dec	Year
Record high °F (°C)	86 (30)	89 (32)	92 (33)	95 (35)	99 (37)	100 (38)	100 (38)	101 (38)	100 (38)	97 (36)	89 (32)	88 (31)	101 (38)
Mean maximum °F (°C)	80.0 (26.7)	82.6 (28.1)	85.9 (29.9)	89.0 (31.7)	93.3 (34.1)	94.8 (34.9)	95.5 (35.3)	95.7 (35.4)	93.1 (33.9)	89.1 (31.7)	83.3 (28.5)	81.1 (27.3)	96.7 (35.9)
Mean daily maximum °F (°C)	67.0 (19.4)	70.4 (21.3)	75.4 (24.1)	80.5 (26.9)	85.7 (29.8)	88.5 (31.4)	89.5 (31.9)	89.5 (31.9)	86.9 (30.5)	81.2 (27.3)	74.0 (23.3)	69.1 (20.6)	79.8 (26.6)
Daily mean °F (°C)	56.5 (13.6)	59.6 (15.3)	64.1 (17.8)	69.6 (20.9)	75.5 (24.2)	79.6 (26.4)	81.1 (27.3)	81.1 (27.3)	78.9 (26.1)	72.5 (22.5)	64.2 (17.9)	59.1 (15.1)	70.1 (21.2)
Mean daily minimum °F (°C)	45.9 (7.7)	48.8 (9.3)	52.8 (11.6)	58.7 (14.8)	65.2 (18.4)	70.7 (21.5)	72.7 (22.6)	72.8 (22.7)	71.0 (21.7)	63.8 (17.7)	54.3 (12.4)	49.1 (9.5)	60.5 (15.8)
Mean minimum °F (°C)	30.1 (−1.1)	34.2 (1.2)	38.9 (3.8)	47.2 (8.4)	56.1 (13.4)	66.7 (19.3)	69.2 (20.7)	70.1 (21.2)	65.5 (18.6)	50.6 (10.3)	40.1 (4.5)	34.9 (1.6)	28.7 (−1.8)
Record low °F (°C)	16 (−9)	23 (−5)	25 (−4)	32 (0)	46 (8)	53 (12)	61 (16)	62 (17)	52 (11)	39 (4)	24 (−4)	16 (−9)	16 (−9)
Average precipitation inches (mm)	2.81 (71)	2.49 (63)	3.49 (89)	2.64 (67)	3.37 (86)	7.51 (191)	6.50 (165)	7.46 (189)	6.32 (161)	2.94 (75)	2.24 (57)	2.26 (57)	50.03 (1,271)
Average precipitation days (≥ 0.01 in)	8.0	6.6	6.6	6.0	6.7	15.3	16.0	16.8	13.2	8.4	7.1	7.4	118.1
Source: NOAA

== Demographics ==
Historical population
Census	Pop.	Note	%±
2020	229		—
U.S. Decennial Census

As of the census of 2000, there were 273 people, 107 households, and 81 families residing in the CDP. The population density was 144.9 inhabitants per square mile (55.9/km^{2}). There were 147 housing units at an average density of 78.0 per square mile (30.1/km^{2}). The racial makeup of the CDP was 92.31% White, 0.73% Native American, 6.96% from other races. Hispanic or Latino of any race were 9.89% of the population.

There were 107 households, out of which 23.4% had children under the age of 18 living with them, 59.8% were married couples living together, 7.5% had a female householder with no husband present, and 23.4% were non-families. 19.6% of all households were made up of individuals, and 9.3% had someone living alone who was 65 years of age or older. The average household size was 2.55 and the average family size was 2.84.

In the CDP, the population was spread out, with 21.2% under the age of 18, 6.2% from 18 to 24, 28.2% from 25 to 44, 24.5% from 45 to 64, and 19.8% who were 65 years of age or older. The median age was 40 years. For every 100 females, there were 111.6 males. For every 100 females age 18 and over, there were 104.8 males.

The median income for a household in the CDP was $22,875, and the median income for a family was $33,984. Males had a median income of $33,281 versus $21,750 for females. The per capita income for the CDP was $13,635. None of the families and 7.5% of the population were living below the poverty line.
