= Arching Oaks Japanese Arts and Culture Center =

Japanese cultural center in Eustis, Florida

- かしもん日本美術会館
- Formation: 2019
- Founders: Sabastian Velilla; Chelsey Velilla
- Type: Non-profit cultural center
- Legal status: 501(c)(3)
- Location: 37114 Thrill Hill Road, Eustis, Florida, U.S.
- Coordinates: 28°53′23″N 81°36′54″W
- Website: archingoaks.org floridabudokan.org

Arching Oaks Japanese Arts and Culture Center (kashimon nihon bijutsu kaikan) is a non-profit educational organization in Eustis, Florida, that focuses on the preservation and instruction of traditional Japanese arts, crafts, and martial arts. Arching Oaks is situated on 20 acres, making it one of the largest zoned Japanese cultural centers in the U.S.

It was established in 2019 by Sabastian and Chelsey Velilla. The center is located at 37114 Thrill Hill Road in Lake County. The campus includes multiple traditional Japanese-style buildings and gardens, dōjō (training halls) known as the Florida Budokan (martial art center), a tatami room for tea ceremonies, and a studio for Japanese arts and crafts.

== History ==
Arching Oaks was founded in 2019 by Sabastian and Chelsey Velilla. Sabastian Velilla is a U.S. Army veteran and martial artist who was the Florida state karate champion in 1988 and later became a certified instructor in karate, Kyūdō, and iaidō. During his military service, he trained in martial arts in Japan and instructed members of the Japan Self-Defense Forces while working for the Department of Defense. Chelsey Velilla previously worked for 12 years as an elementary art teacher and was a gallery manager at the Mount Dora Center for the Arts. The founders established the center on their property in Eustis, constructing facilities in a traditional Japanese style.

The center opened to the public in February 2019. By 2024, Arching Oaks had received formal recognition from Eustis city officials, who invited the Velillas to present the center's mission at a City Commission meeting and included information about the center on the city's website. In 2026, Arching Oaks received a proclamation from the Lake County Board of County Commissioners recognizing its contributions to Japanese arts, cultural education, and community engagement in Lake County.

== Operations ==
Arching Oaks Japanese Arts and Culture Center is registered as a 501(c)(3) non-profit organization. The center is located approximately 40 miles northwest of Orlando. Its facilities include the Florida Budokan, a complex of two traditional dōjō for martial arts practice. One structure is a dedicated kyūdōjō with a 28-meter archery range and is the only traditional kyūdō range in the state of Florida. The main dōjō is used for karate and swordsmanship training. The campus also contains a traditional tatami room used for chanoyu (tea ceremonies) and Kodo (incense ceremonies).

In addition to martial arts facilities, the property has an art studio and pottery workshop for instruction in Japanese ceramics and ink painting. The grounds feature walking trails, a koi pond, and gardens used for activities such as shinrin-yoku (forest bathing). In 2024, the center received a grant to fund accessibility improvements on the property.

== Programs ==
Arching Oaks provides instruction in Budō (martial arts) and bunka (cultural arts). Martial arts classes include Shotokan karate, Kyūdō (Japanese archery), and Iaidō (traditional swordsmanship). Cultural arts programs include classes and workshops in Origami, shodō (calligraphy), Ikebana (flower arranging), Bonsai, seihōn (bookbinding), Shibori dyeing, and Nerikomi pottery. The center also offers meditation sessions and guided shinrin-yoku walks on the property.

The center’s annual Shugyō Matsuri, originally developed as a local celebration of Japanese martial arts, traditional arts, and cultural education, grew into the inaugural Japan Festival Eustis in 2026. Held in partnership with the City of Eustis, the festival expanded the center’s cultural outreach into a larger community event and drew more than 8,000 attendees. The event featured martial arts demonstrations, traditional Japanese arts, performances, family activities, and public cultural programming. Arching Oaks also conducts year-round outreach through collaborations with local schools, libraries, and community centers.

In 2026, Japan Festival Eustis received three second-place SUNsational Awards from the Florida Festivals and Events Association, in the categories of Best New Event, Community Outreach Program, and PR / Media Campaign. Arching Oaks also received a Bronze Flagler Award from VISIT FLORIDA in the Special Event category for the festival.,
