= Ferran Park and the Alice McClelland Memorial Bandshell =

Historic site in Eustis, Florida

- U.S. National Register of Historic Places
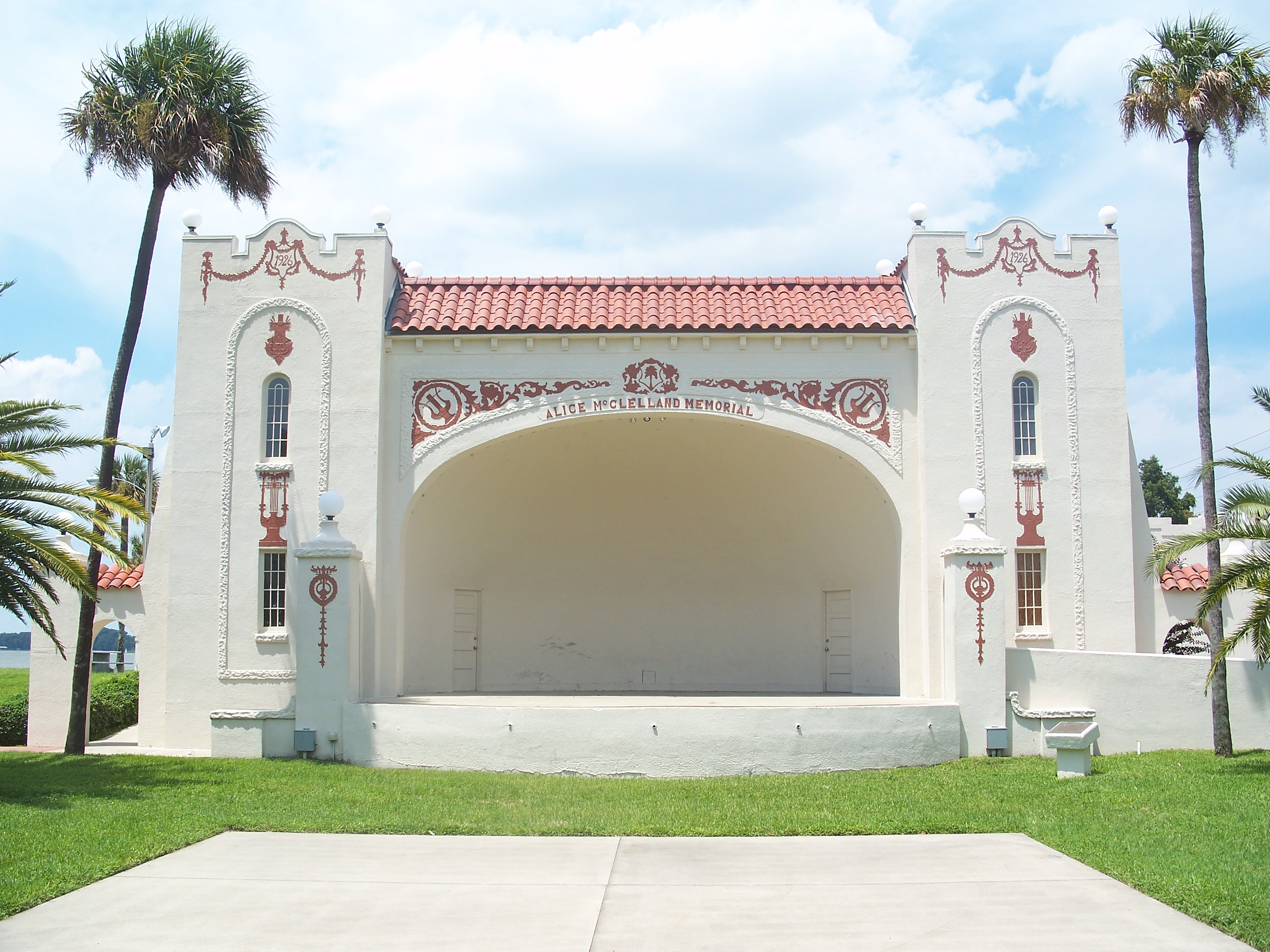
- Bandshell in Ferran Park

- Location within Florida Location within the United States
- Location: Eustis, Florida
- Coordinates: 28°51′14″N 81°41′12″W
- Architect: Alan J. MacDonough
- Architectural style: Mission/Spanish Revival
- NRHP reference No.: 94000625
- Added to NRHP: June 23, 1994

Ferran Park and the Alice McClelland Memorial Bandshell (also known as the Eustis Bandshell) is a historic site in Eustis, Florida. It is located at the junction of Ferran Park Road and Orange Avenue, on Lake Eustis. On June 23, 1994, it was added to the U.S. National Register of Historic Places. On July 6, 2005, it became a contributing property to the Eustis Commercial Historic District.
