= Richard Williams (American football) =

American football player (born 1960)

No. 22, 35
- Position: Running back

Personal information
- Born: August 13, 1960 (age 66); Eustis, Florida, U.S.
- Listed height: 6 ft 0 in (1.83 m)
- Listed weight: 205 lb (93 kg)

Career information
- High school: Eustis
- College: Memphis
- NFL draft: 1983: 2nd round, 56th overall pick

Career history
- Washington Redskins (1983)*; Atlanta Falcons (1983–1984); Houston Oilers (1984)
- * Offseason or practice squad member only

Career NFL statistics
- Rushing yards: 5
- Rushing average: 5
- Return yards: 545
- Stats at Pro Football Reference

Richard Keith Williams (born August 13, 1960) is an American former professional football player who was a running back in the National Football League (NFL). He played college football for the Memphis Tigers. He was selected by the Washington Redskins in the second round of the 1983 NFL draft and played for the Atlanta Falcons and Houston Oilers.
