= Patricia Sullivan (politician) =

American, a resident of Florida

Patricia Sullivan is an American, a resident of Florida, who became a leader in the modern Tea Party movement.

== Career ==
Sullivan ran for the United States House of Representatives under the Tea Party banner in 2010. The Orlando Sentinel quoted her opinion over proposed Congressional redistricting.

In February 2011, Florida Governor Rick Scott traveled to Sullivan's hometown of Eustis, Florida to release the state's 2011 budget. Scott's office sought out Tea Party leaders for suggestions for where he should release the budget. The Orlando Sentinel described his choice of Sullivan's town as a political coup on her part. Scott's decision was described by the chair of the Lake County Democrats as an attempt "to get an army together to back his tax cuts." 7,000 people came to Eustis for the budget.

On November 30, 2011, when the resignation of Herman Cain, a Republican Presidential contender, seemed imminent, the Boston Globe sought Sullivan's opinion as to who would replace him as a lead contender. She didn't state who she would support as an alternative to Cain, but she offered criticism of Mitt Romney.

Six days later, following the Cain's resignation, Marc Caputo, of the Miami Herald sought Sullivan's opinion as a key member of Cain's support team. At that time she ruled out Mitt Romney, Ron Paul, Jon Huntsman and Michele Bachmann. Sullivan came second to Blaise Ingoglia in the Florida Republican Party's choice of chairman.
