= Lake Griffin State Park =

Florida State Park

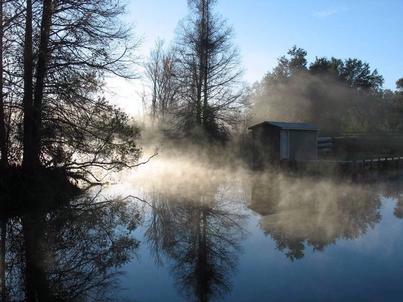
- The boathouse at Lake Griffin State Park in the early morning

- Location within Florida Location within the United States
- Interactive map of Lake Griffin State Park
- Location: Lake County, Florida, USA
- Nearest city: Fruitland Park, Florida
- Coordinates: 28°51′50″N 81°53′38″W
- Area: 500 acres (200 ha)
- Governing body: Florida Department of Environmental Protection

Lake Griffin State Park is a Florida State Park located two miles (3 km) north of Leesburg, in Fruitland Park and 30 miles (48 km) south of Ocala on U.S. Highway 441. It is home to one of the state's largest live oak trees, estimated to be about 400 years old. The park is unique in connecting to Lake Griffin, the Ocklawaha River and thence to the Harris Chain of Lakes, and is made up of 577.63 acres (2.33758 km^{2}) of swampland and hardwood upland.

Activities include boating and canoeing, kayaking, hiking, fishing, camping, and wildlife viewing. Among the wildlife of the park are osprey, bald eagle, blue heron, anhinga, ibis, American alligator, and river otter.

Amenities include a full-facility campground, a half-mile nature trail, a boat ramp that provides access to the Dead River, and a playground for small children as well as kayak and canoe rentals, a forty site campground, and a picnic area. The park is open from 8:00 am until sundown year-round.
