= Yalaha, Florida =

- Census-designated place
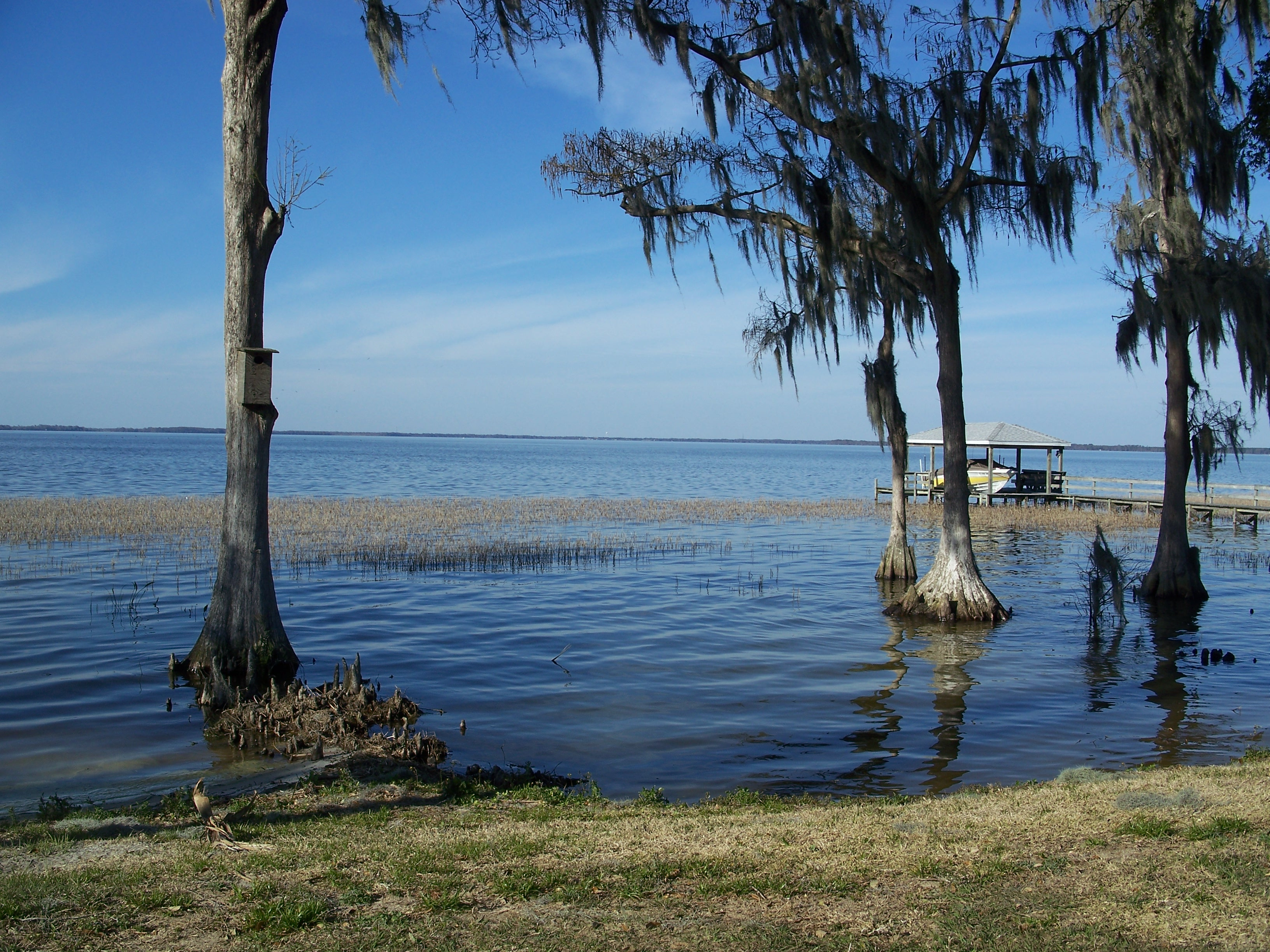
- A view of Yalaha on Lake Harris

- Location in Lake County and the state of Florida
- Coordinates: 28°44′40″N 81°48′54″W
- Country: United States
- State: Florida
- County: Lake

Area
  - Total: 14.40 sq mi (37.30 km^{2})
  - Land: 5.68 sq mi (14.70 km^{2})
  - Water: 8.73 sq mi (22.61 km^{2})
- Elevation: 62 ft (19 m)

Population (2020)
  - Total: 1,505
  - Density: 265.2/sq mi (102.41/km^{2})
- Time zone: UTC-5 (Eastern (EST))
  - Summer (DST): UTC-4 (EDT)
- ZIP code: 34797
- Area code: 352
- FIPS code: 12-78900
- GNIS feature ID: 2403046

Yalaha is an unincorporated area and census-designated place (CDP) in Lake County, Florida, United States. As of the 2020 census, Yalaha had a population of 1,505. It is part of the Orlando–Kissimmee Metropolitan Statistical Area.

== Geography ==
Yalaha is located in central Lake County on the south shore of Lake Harris. It is bordered to the west by the Leesburg city limits and to the southeast by the town of Howey-in-the-Hills. The center of Yalaha is 9 miles (14 km) southeast of the center of Leesburg, 16 miles (26 km) north of Groveland, and 10 miles (16 km) southwest of Tavares, the Lake county seat.

According to the United States Census Bureau, the Yalaha CDP has a total area of 14.4 square miles (37.3 km^{2}), of which 5.7 square miles (14.7 km^{2}) are land and 8.7 square miles (22.6 km^{2}), or 60.60%, are water. Most of the water area is part of Lake Harris, part of the upper Ocklawaha River basin.

== Demographics ==
Historical population
Census	Pop.	Note	%±
2020	1,505		—
U.S. Decennial Census

=== 2020 census ===
As of the 2020 census, Yalaha had a population of 1,505. The median age was 57.2 years. 13.0% of residents were under the age of 18 and 35.0% of residents were 65 years of age or older. For every 100 females there were 100.4 males, and for every 100 females age 18 and over there were 100.8 males age 18 and over.

3.5% of residents lived in urban areas, while 96.5% lived in rural areas.

There were 650 households in Yalaha, of which 12.0% had children under the age of 18 living in them. Of all households, 59.1% were married-couple households, 15.5% were households with a male householder and no spouse or partner present, and 19.4% were households with a female householder and no spouse or partner present. About 25.5% of all households were made up of individuals and 17.0% had someone living alone who was 65 years of age or older.

There were 763 housing units, of which 14.8% were vacant. The homeowner vacancy rate was 3.2% and the rental vacancy rate was 15.6%.

Racial composition as of the 2020 census
Race	Number	Percent
White	1,197	79.5%
Black or African American	100	6.6%
American Indian and Alaska Native	6	0.4%
Asian	32	2.1%
Native Hawaiian and Other Pacific Islander	0	0.0%
Some other race	48	3.2%
Two or more races	122	8.1%
Hispanic or Latino (of any race)	152	10.1%

=== 2000 census ===
As of the census of 2000, there were 1,175 people, 521 households, and 385 families residing in the CDP. The population density was 188.0 inhabitants per square mile (72.6/km^{2}). There were 601 housing units at an average density of 96.2 per square mile (37.1/km^{2}). The racial makeup of the CDP was 83.66% White, 11.83% African American, 0.17% Native American, 0.77% Asian, 2.38% from other races, and 1.19% from two or more races. Hispanic or Latino of any race were 4.68% of the population.

There were 521 households, out of which 18.2% had children under the age of 18 living with them, 64.7% were married couples living together, 6.1% had a female householder with no husband present, and 26.1% were non-families. 23.8% of all households were made up of individuals, and 15.0% had someone living alone who was 65 years of age or older. The average household size was 2.24 and the average family size was 2.62.

In the CDP, the population was spread out, with 17.1% under the age of 18, 3.7% from 18 to 24, 20.8% from 25 to 44, 29.0% from 45 to 64, and 29.4% who were 65 years of age or older. The median age was 50 years. For every 100 females, there were 94.2 males. For every 100 females age 18 and over, there were 96.4 males.

The median income for a household in the CDP was $31,940, and the median income for a family was $38,026. Males had a median income of $31,932 versus $22,829 for females. The per capita income for the CDP was $19,734. About 6.0% of families and 11.2% of the population were below the poverty line, including 21.2% of those under age 18 and 11.5% of those age 65 or over.
