= Eustis Commercial Historic District =

Historic district in Florida, United States

- U.S. National Register of Historic Places
- U.S. Historic district
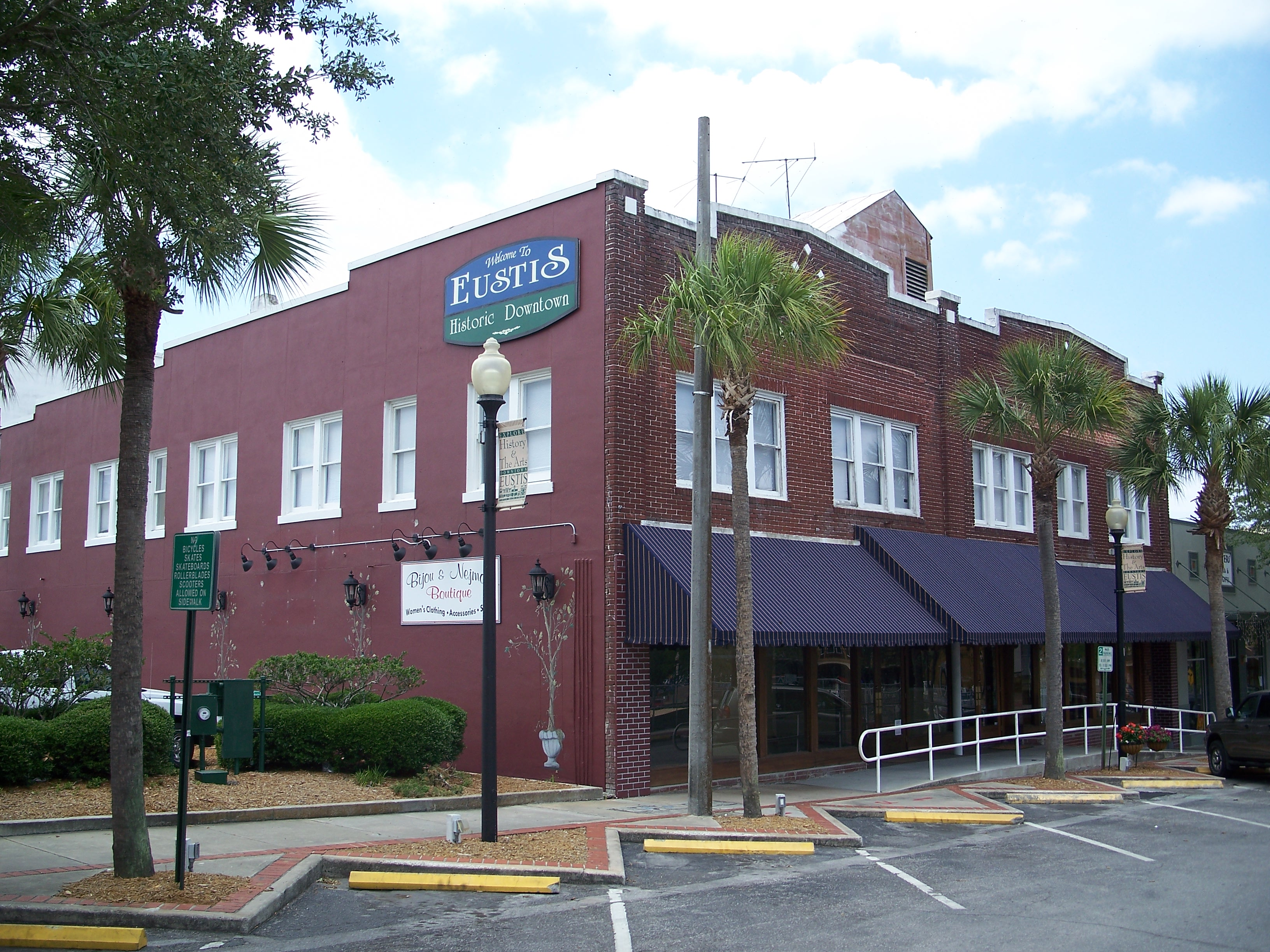
- Building in the district

- Location within Florida Location within the United States
- Location: Eustis, Florida
- Coordinates: 28°51′13″N 81°41′7″W
- Architectural style: Early Commercial, Classical Revival
- NRHP reference No.: 05000654
- Added to NRHP: July 6, 2005

The Eustis Commercial Historic District is a U.S. historic district (designated as such on July 6, 2005) located in Eustis, Florida. The district is bounded roughly by Lake Eustis, McDonald Avenue, Grove Street and Orange Avenue.
