= Fort Hembree =

Coordinates: 35.0372°N 83.8231°W

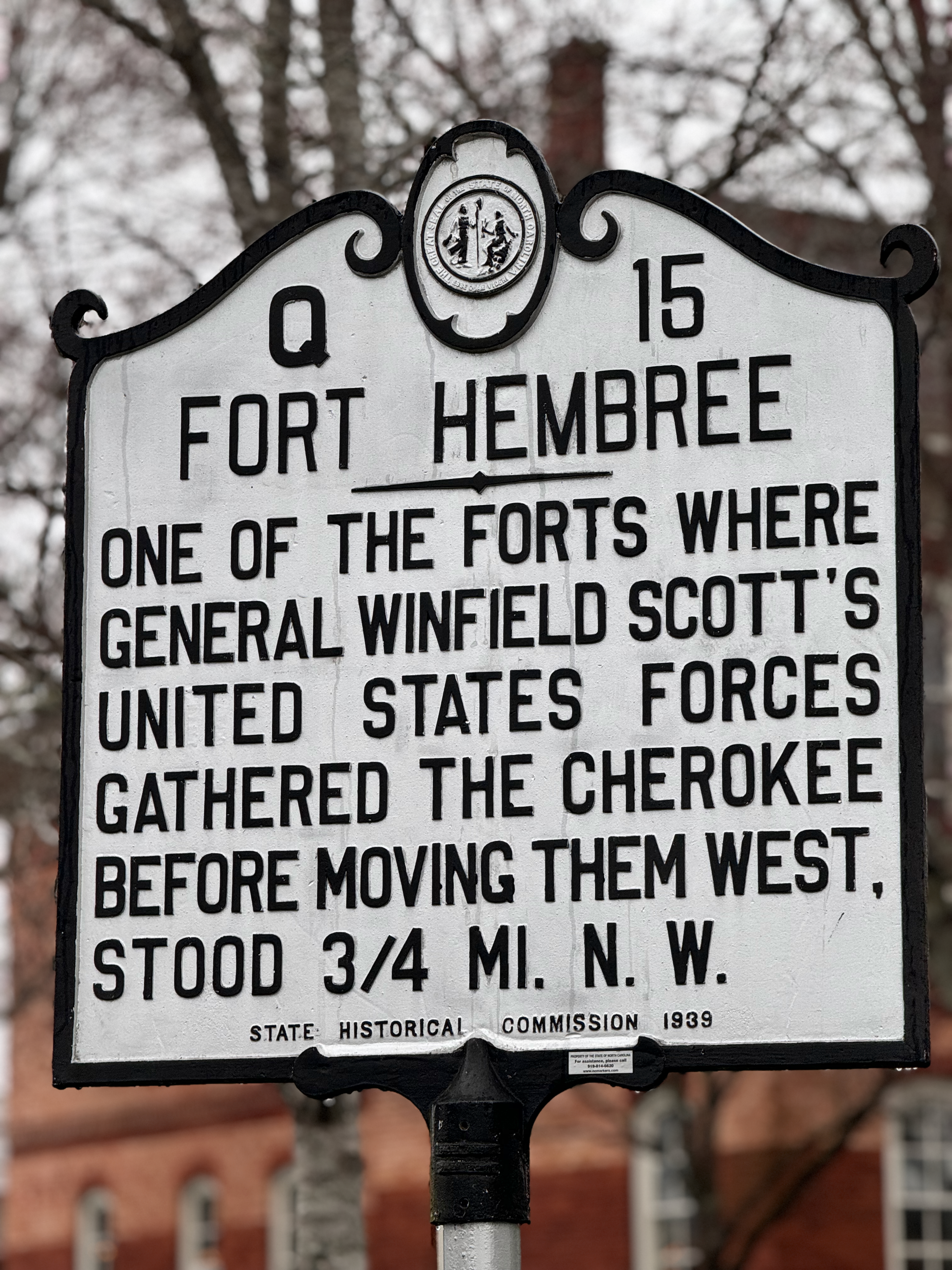
A state historical marker for Fort Hembree in downtown Hayesville

Tennessee militia established Fort Hembree 1 mile (1.6 km) southwest of the present town of Hayesville, North Carolina, in October 1837 to prepare for deporting local Cherokee Native Americans during the Trail of Tears. The fort was under the command of General Winfield Scott. Within two week Scott's forces captured around 1,000 Cherokee people who were held prisoner at the fort. A number of Cherokees were stricken with illness (thought to be measles) while at Fort Hembree and died at the site. The remainder were marched from there to Fort Butler near present-day Murphy and then to deportation camps in Tennessee.

== Background ==
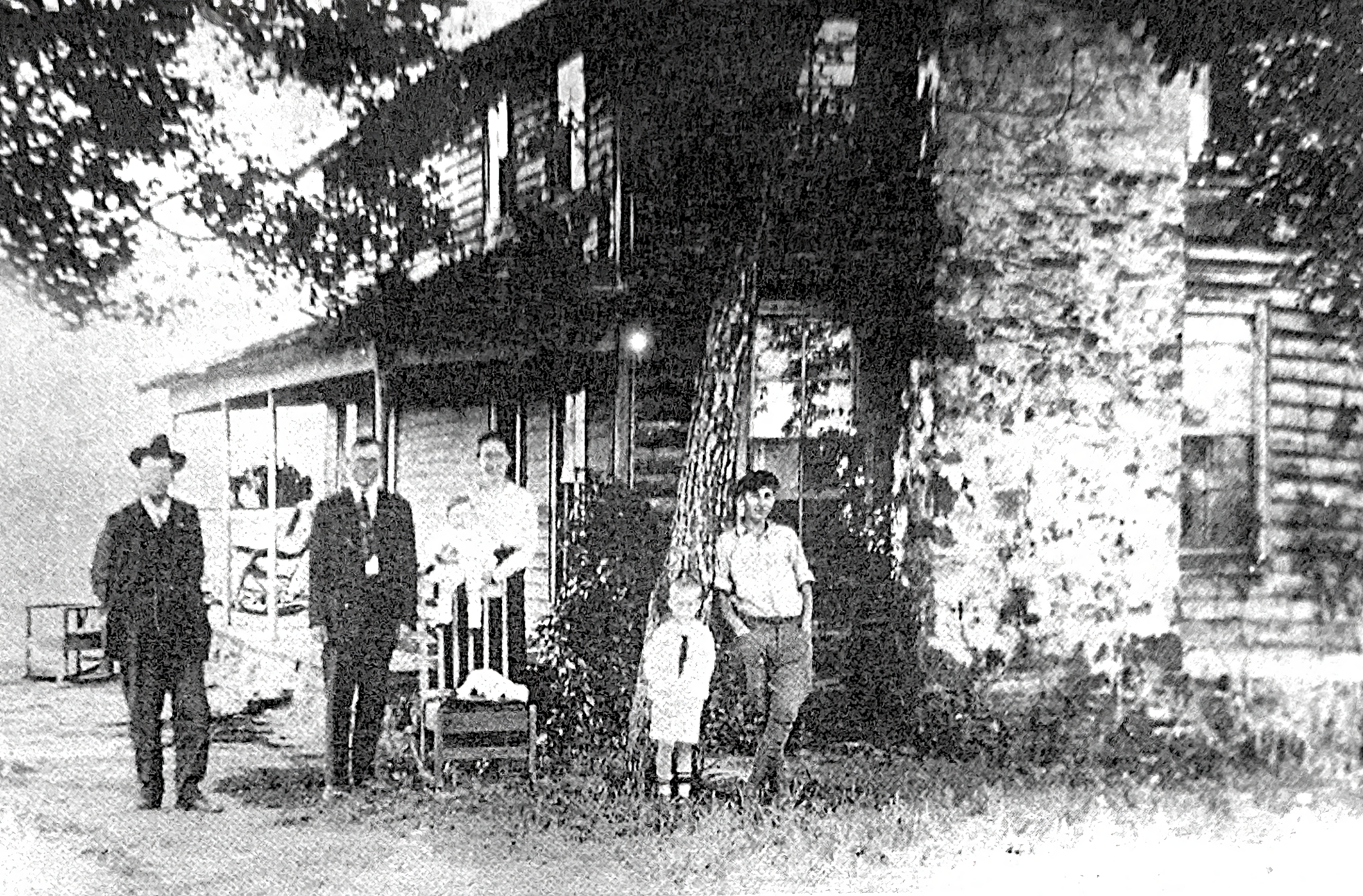
Fort Hembree's main building as seen around 1920 with members of the Scroggs family

Fort Hembree was designed by John C. Fremont, the first Republican nominee for president of the U.S. The fort was built on “Fort Hill” between Blair Creek and Town Creek near the Unicoi Turnpike. The facility was approximately 200 by 600 feet in size. It was named in honor of Captain Joel Hembree, who served in the Tennessee Volunteer Militia under General Scott’s command. The fort contained multiple blockhouses and a T-shaped log building with a large dining hall and cellar. Rocks from the four chimneys dated to 1817.

A hand-dug well supplied the fort with water. The fort was a place where settlers could go during emergencies, like conflicts with Native Americans. It also provided housing for soldiers and officers and their families. Near the fort was a barn where Cherokee people were held captive on the second level. The fort was abandoned by the military in June 1838. The first post office to open in what became Clay County began service at Fort Hembree on January 8, 1844. It also included a general store. By 1850 the building housed an academy run by John Oliver Hicks. Hicks went on to establish what would become the nearby Hayesville High School in 1870. The fort was reactivated in 1860 to train soldiers for the Civil War.

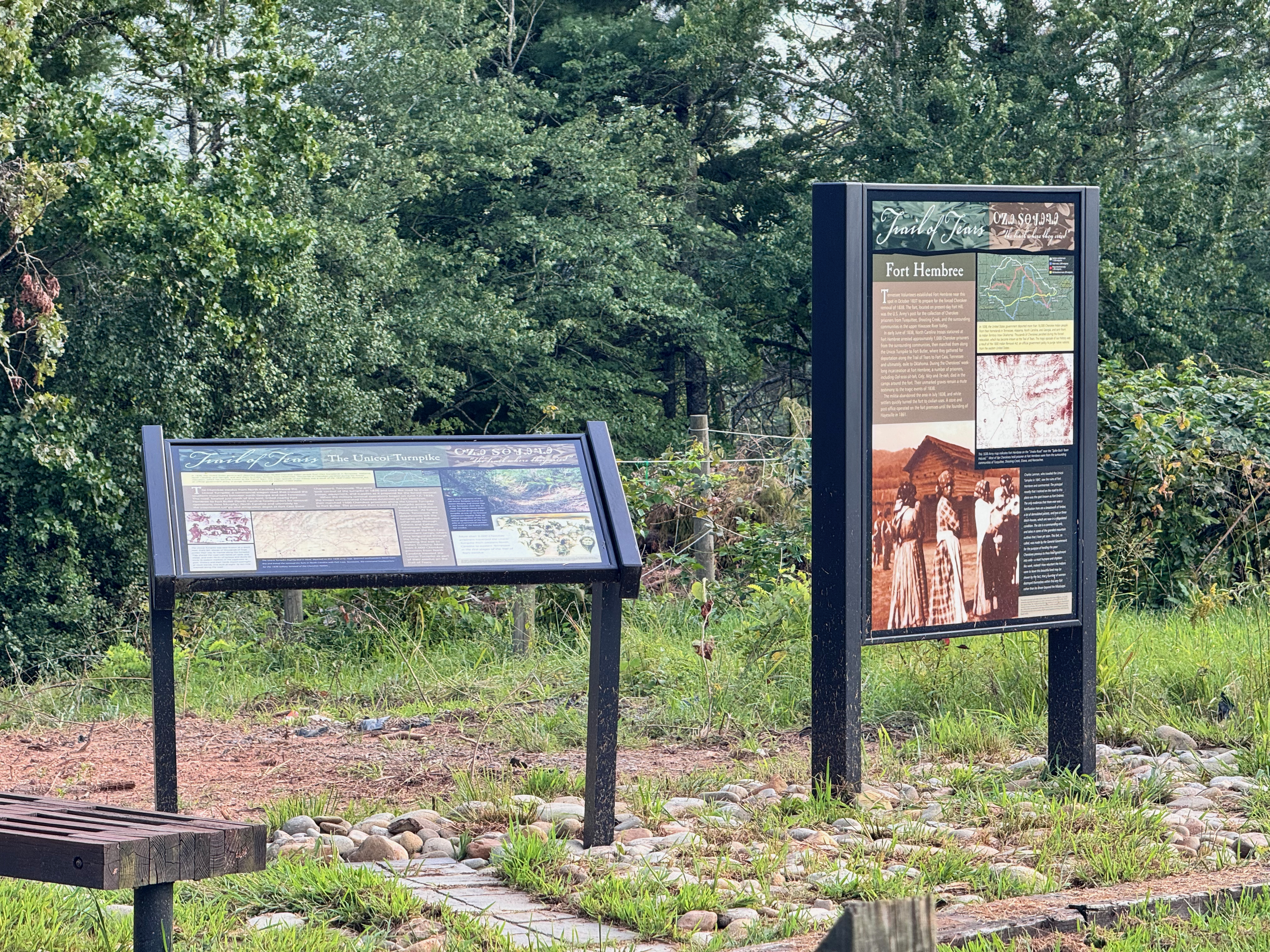
Historical markers near the Fort Hembree site in 2026

The town of Hayesville was established nearby in 1861 after Clay County was formed out of Cherokee County. Early Clay County court trials and the first county commissioners’ meetings were held at the fort. Before it was Hayesville the area was known as Fort Hembree Township. The small town of Hayesville became county seat instead of Fort Hembree mainly because whiskey was too easily available to soldiers at the fort. The fort later became a private home owned by the Garth Thompson family in the early 1900s. The fort was demolished around 1934. Some of its materials were used to construct local homes. Rocks from the cellar and foundation were donated to build Hayesville's First United Methodist Church. The site is now owned by a private citizen and today the area remains known by Fort Hembree Road.
