= Anthony Fieldings =

American gridiron football player (born 1971)

No. 50, 54
- Position: Linebacker

Personal information
- Born: July 9, 1971 (age 55); Eustis, Florida, U.S.
- Listed height: 6 ft 1 in (1.85 m)
- Listed weight: 237 lb (108 kg)

Career information
- High school: Eustis
- College: Morningside
- NFL draft: 1993: undrafted

Career history
- Buffalo Bills (1993)*; Rhein Fire (1995); Dallas Cowboys (1995); Rhein Fire (1996–1997); Saskatchewan Roughriders (1998)*
- * Offseason or practice squad member only

Awards and highlights
- All-NCC (1991)

Career NFL statistics
- Games played: 4
- Stats at Pro Football Reference

Anthony Fieldings (born July 9, 1971) is an American former professional football player who was a linebacker in the National Football League (NFL) for the Buffalo Bills and Dallas Cowboys. He also was a member of the Rhein Fire in the World League of American Football (WLAF). He played college football for the Morningside Mustangs.

== Early life ==
Fieldings attended Eustis High School. He accepted a football scholarship from Division II Morningside College. As a junior in 1991, he was a starter at inside linebacker and set a school single-season record with 151 tackles. He also set a school single-game record with 24 tackles against the University of South Dakota. He left as the school's all-time leader in career tackles.

== Professional career ==
Fieldings was signed as an undrafted free agent by the Buffalo Bills after the 1993 NFL draft on May 7. He was waived on August 24. On December 30, 1993, he was re-signed to the practice squad. He was released on August 22, 1994.

On July 31, 1995, he signed as a free agent with the Dallas Cowboys. He was a reserve player, registering one defensive tackle and 5 special teams tackles. He appeared in 4 games and was released on October 4. The team would go on to win Super Bowl XXX.

In 1998, he was signed as a free agent by the Saskatchewan Roughriders of the Canadian Football League. He was released on June 9.

== Personal life ==
In 2016, he was a part of a group of former players that filed a civil suit against the NFL, requesting it to recognize brain injury disease for workers' compensation.
