= Clifford House (Eustis, Florida) =

Historic house in Florida, United States

- U.S. National Register of Historic Places
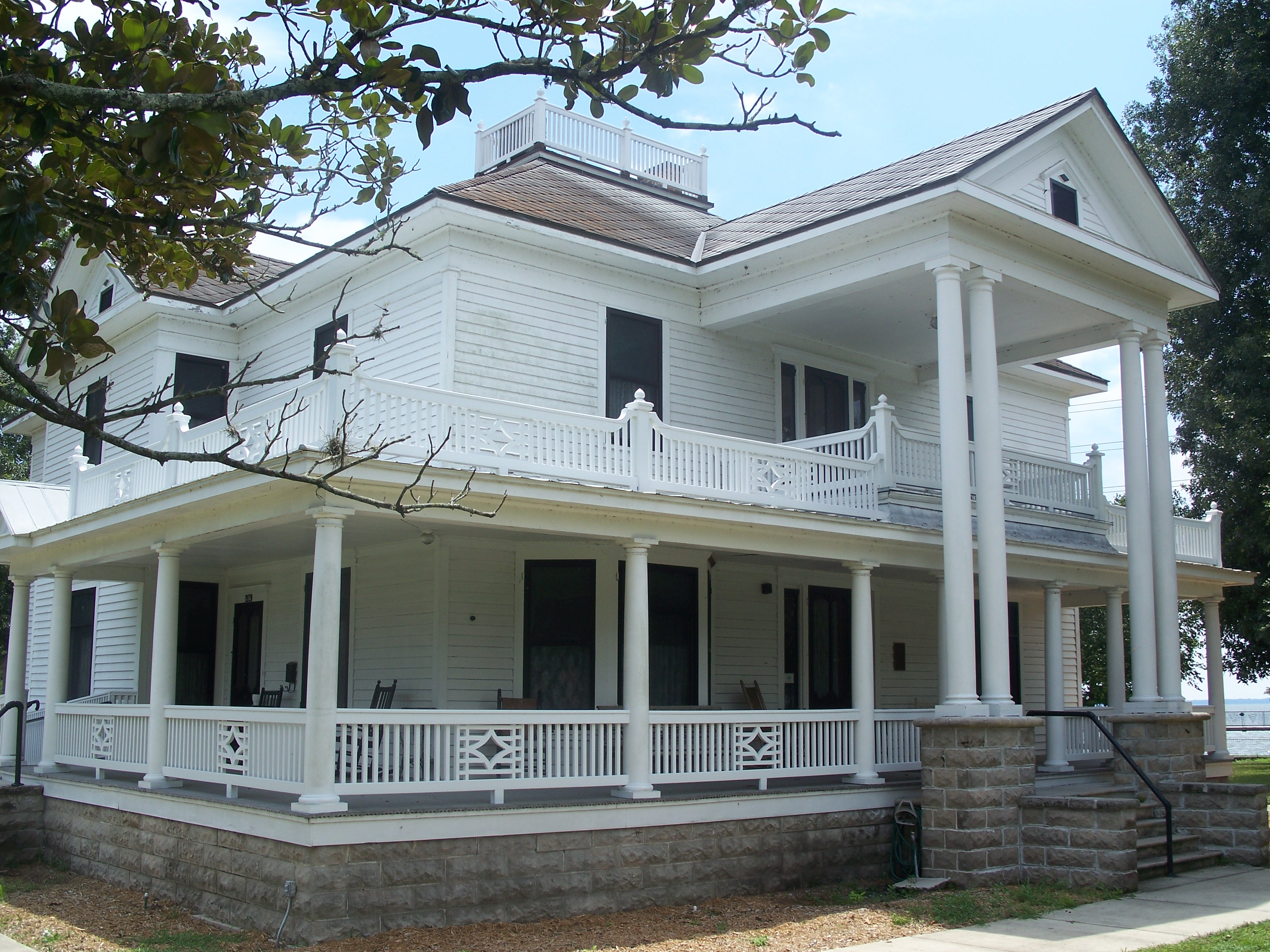

- Location within Florida Location within the United States
- Location: Eustis, Florida
- Coordinates: 28°51′28″N 81°41′11″W
- Architectural style: Classical Revival
- NRHP reference No.: 75000559
- Added to NRHP: April 4, 1975

The Clifford House (also known as the Clifford-Taylor House) is a historic home in Eustis, Florida, United States. It is located at 536 North Bay Street. On April 4, 1975, it was added to the U.S. National Register of Historic Places. It was owned by G.D. Clifford, an early settler and local merchandiser.

Construction began in 1910 and completed in 1911, the 4,500 sq ft (420 m^{2}). Clifford house has 18 rooms and is home to the Eustis Historical Museum & Preservation Society, which was founded in 1983.

== Eustis Historical Museum ==
Each room of the Clifford House has a different theme, and features period antiques and displays of local history. One room is called the “Indiana Jones Room”, and is dedicated to the memory of Dr. Edgar J. Banks, a professor and archaeologist who spent time in Eustis, and who is held up as the inspiration for the character of Indiana Jones.

The Citrus Museum is located next to Clifford House, and features exhibits related to the area's former importance in the citrus industry, including labels, posters, utensils, tools, equipment and other memorabilia.
