= Edgar James Banks =

American diplomat, antiquarian and writer

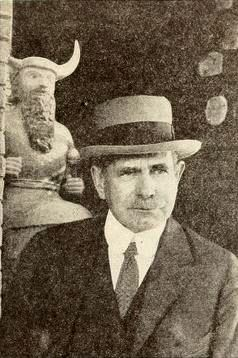
- Banks in 1922
- Born: May 23, 1866
- Died: May 5, 1945 (aged 78); Eustis, Florida, U.S.
- Occupations: American consul in Baghdad; antiquarian; novelist; archaeologist; historian
- Years active: 1898—1921
- Employer: University of Toledo
- Known for: Collection and distribution of cuneiform tablets Possibly inspiring Indiana Jones

Edgar James Banks (May 23, 1866 – May 5, 1945) was an American diplomat, antiquarian and novelist.

== Biography ==
Banks was an antiquities enthusiast and entrepreneurial roving archaeologist in the closing days of the Ottoman Empire, who has been held up as an original for the fictional composite figure of Indiana Jones. Starting from his position as American consul in Baghdad in 1898, Banks bought hundreds of cuneiform tablets on the market in the closing days of the Ottoman Empire and resold them in small batches to museums, libraries, universities, and theological seminaries, several in Utah and the Southwestern United States and across the United States. These tablets had been dug up by locals at sites like Telloh and the many other tells of central Mesopotamia. Banks purchased many more cuneiform inscriptions from a dealer in Constantinople. His export of antiquities was an infringement of Article 8 of the 1884 Ottoman Antiquities Law.

He wrote a book, published in 1912, about his excavations of the ancient Sumerian city of Adab, located in what is now Bismya/Bismaya in Iraq. The book contains lively accounts of his excavations in Adab and discoveries of a sequence of buildings from the prehistoric into the reign of Ur-Nammu in the ancient Sumerian city. It details also his extensive expeditions in the region and struggles with the Ottoman bureaucracy which, though he had been funded for an expedition to the site of Ur, had refused permits for digs at Babylon, Tell Ibrahim, or other prominent sites. In 1903 it was decided that his excavations were to be at Bismya, the site of ancient Adab, in Iraq.

In 1909 Banks became a professor of Oriental languages and archaeology at the University of Toledo. After World War I, Banks travelled and lectured extensively, scattering his cuneiform tablets among purchasers wherever he went. Tablets Banks sold to Charles W. Ames are now in the Science Museum of Minnesota, University of Minnesota, and many other private and public sites in the U.S.

Banks is known as the person who sold the ancient mathematical cuneiform tablet Plimpton 322, which was likely excavated in what is now southern Iraq, to the New York publisher George Arthur Plimpton, reportedly for $10. It was housed in Plimpton's private collection before being donated to Columbia University shortly before Plimpton's death. The artifact contains a table of numbers related to Pythagorean triples, and has been the subject of numerous studies by historians of mathematics.

Edgar Banks also started two film companies and climbed Mount Ararat in a search for Noah's Ark. Cecil B. DeMille apparently invited Banks to become a consultant on Bible epics in 1921.

Banks was an active lecturer and author. It was during such a lecturing trip in 1921 that he discovered Eustis, Florida, and decided to retire there. He died in Eustis in 1945 at the age of 79. The Eustis Historical Museum features one room with exhibits about Banks.
