= Abraham Eustis =

U.S. Army officer (1786-1843)

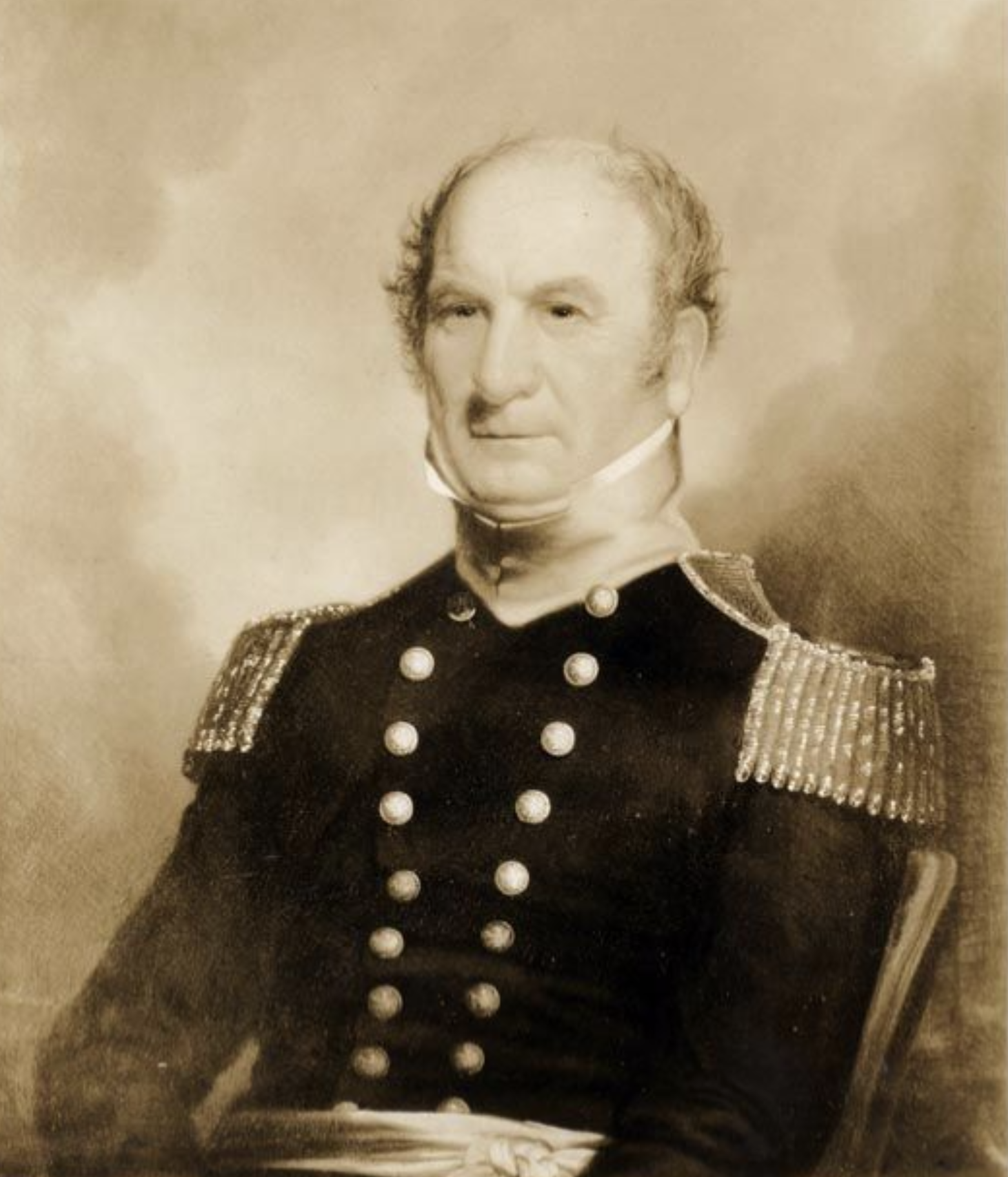
- Born: March 26, 1786; Petersburg, Virginia, U.S.
- Died: June 27, 1843 (aged 57); Portland, Maine, U.S.
- Burial place: Mount Auburn Cemetery
- Education: Harvard College A.B. (1804); Bowdoin College A.M. (1806)
- Children: Henry L. Eustis
- Relatives: William Eustis (uncle)
- Military career
- Branch: U.S. Army
- Rank: Brevet Brigadier General
- Commands: Fort Monroe; Fort Butler
- Wars: War of 1812; Black Hawk War; Seminole Wars
- Memorials: Fort Eustis; Eustis, Florida; Lake Eustis

Abraham Eustis (March 26, 1786 – June 27, 1843) was a lawyer and notable U.S. Army officer, eventually rising to become a Brevet Brigadier General. He saw service in Florida and became a notable artillery specialist and the first commander of Fort Monroe, located at the entrance to the harbor of Hampton Roads in Virginia.

In Florida, Lake Eustis and the city of Eustis were each named in his honor. Camp Abraham Eustis, a World War I-era U.S. Army base along the James River, was named for him. Later renamed Fort Eustis and now located in the independent city of Newport News, Virginia, it is part of an expanded and active facility, Joint Base Langley-Eustis.

== Biography ==
Eustis was born in Petersburg, Virginia. He was the son of Abraham Eustis and Margaret (Parker) Eustis and the nephew of William Eustis, who served as secretary of war from 1809 to 1812. Eustis earned the degrees of A.B. from Harvard College in 1804 and A.M. from Bowdoin College two years later. He joined the army in May 1808 and served during the War of 1812, the Black Hawk War (1832), and the Seminole Wars.

In 1830, Eustis became the first commander of Fort Monroe, which guards the entrance to Hampton Roads at Old Point Comfort in southeastern Virginia. There for many years, he commanded the school for Artillery Practice. In May 1838, Eustis took command of Fort Butler, one of the main military posts built for the forced removal of the Cherokee known as the Trail of Tears. Nearly 5,000 Cherokee of North Carolina and Georgia were taken to Fort Butler, then to the main internment camp at Fort Cass. The troops stationed at Fort Butler were those of Eustis's command from the Second Seminole War in Florida.

He was the father of Brigadier General Henry L. Eustis. Eustis died at Portland, Maine, while in command of the 6th U.S. Military District, which was headquartered there at the time.

== Fort Eustis ==
Fort Eustis was originally known as Camp Abraham Eustis when it was established during World War I on historic Mulberry Island and an adjacent portion of the mainland along the James River in Warwick County, upstream from Newport News Shipbuilding and Drydock Company. It became Fort Eustis and a permanent Army base in 1923. Fort Eustis is now located within the corporate limits of the independent city of Newport News (which merged with the former Warwick County in 1958). An Army Aviation School is also located there. The James River Reserve Fleet of decommissioned vessels, known locally as the "Dead Fleet" is located in the river offshore. With the base closure of Fort Monroe in nearby Hampton, a portion of the work there has shifted to Fort Eustis.

== Notes and references ==
- Duncan, Barbara R. and Riggs, Brett H. Cherokee Heritage Trails Guidebook. University of North Carolina Press: Chapel Hill (2003). ISBN 0-8078-5457-3
