= Eustis High School =

Location
- 1300 E Washington Ave; Eustis, Florida; United States
- Coordinates: 28°50′48″N 81°40′19″W

Information
- Type: Public school, Co-ed
- School district: Lake County Schools
- NCES School ID: 120105001092
- Teaching staff: 71.00 (on FTE basis)
- Grades: 9–12
- Enrollment: 1,405 (2023-2024)
- Student to teacher ratio: 19.79
- Colors: Navy and gold
- Mascot: Panther
- Website: ehs.lake.k12.fl.us/o/ehs

Eustis High School is the local high school for the city of Eustis, Florida, United States. Located at 1300 E Washington Ave Eustis, FL 32726. Athletic teams are the Panthers. The school is a member of the Lake County Schools district.

== Athletics ==
Eustis High has sports teams for male and female students including basketball, baseball, football, swimming, track, volleyball, weightlifting, softball, cross country, and soccer.

=== Basketball ===
The Eustis High School boys' basketball team is a member of the 5A District 13 Standings in the State of Florida.

==== 2013 ====
In 2013 the Panthers finished 8–0 in their district and went 23–8 overall. Although the Panthers had a perfect 8–0 district record in the regular season, they lost 63–61 to Mt Dora High School in the District Championship game. Eustis would end up losing in the 3rd round of the playoffs to American Heritage who would go on to win the 5A state title a week later. The Panthers' only home loss of the 2013 season came in the 3rd round of the playoffs to American Heritage. The Panthers lost 52–47. They ended their year 11–1 at home, 10–4 away and 2–3 at neutral locations.

==== 2014 ====
The Eustis Panthers ended their 2014–15 season in the 3rd round of the playoffs with a 38–49 loss to Cardinal Gibbons at home. Six days later Cardinal Gibbons beat Gibbs High School (St. Petersburg, FL) in the final four by a score of 73–38. The following day they won the Florida 5A state championship. This was the second year in a row that the Panthers lost to the eventual state champion in the playoffs. Overall the Panthers went 23–7 in the 2014–2015 season giving them an impressive eleven consecutive winning seasons. The Panthers went 10–3 at home, 9–3 away and 4–1 at neutral sites. They forced 1827 points and allowed 1440. Eustis went a perfect 6–0 in their district. Additionally, they went 2–0 in district tournament play and were titled district champions.

Season	Overall record	District record	playoffs	Notes
2005-06	22-3	11-1	4th round	
2006-07	17-8	9-1	3rd round	
2007-08	22-4	8-0	4th round	district champions
2008-09	14-13	4-3		
2009-10	12-4	2-0		district champions
2010-11	13-9	5-1	1st round	
2011-12	23-5	9-1	1st round	
2012-13	19-10	8-2	3rd round	
2013-14	23-8	8-0	3rd round	district champions
2014-15	23-7	6-0	3rd round	district champions
2015-16	14-13	4-6		

- Overall 203–85 (.705)
- Non-district 84–53
- District 75–19
- Playoffs 16–10
- Home 81–25
- Away 75–31
- Neutral 47–28
- In-state 202–85
- Out-of-state 1–0

All season records above are from 2005 and after.

The Panthers' only out-of-state game was against East Hall High School, Georgia on December 27, 2012. The Panthers won 83–76. This is the Panthers' only recorded out-of-state game since 2004. East Hall is a school similar in size to Eustis with 1,100 students and is located just outside Gainesville, Georgia

=== Baseball ===
In 2010 David Lee announced he was returning to coach the Panthers' boys baseball team in their 2011 season. Lee led the Panthers to their 2000 state championship win shortly before retiring from Eustis. Lee would leave the Panthers to coach Leesburg High School for five years and then led the Apopka Blue Darters until 2010. Coach Lee has been head coach of the Eustis Panthers for the last six years. In that time he has compiled a record of 124–43 (.743) along with five district championships and six consecutive seasons with playoff appearances.

==== 2013–14 season ====
In 2013 Eustis's boys' baseball team finished 20–9 overall and 5–1 in their district. They were 9–3 at home, 7–3 away and 4–2 at neutral locations. They scored 143 runs while allowing just 81. Eustis boys' baseball lost in the 2nd round of the playoffs by a score of 1–2. They lost to Rockledge who would later lose to the state runner-up two weeks later. The Eustis Panthers baseball program has claimed two state Championships in recent history, the first being in 2000 and then a second in 2003.

==== 2014–15 season ====
In 2014, Eustis won its 5th consecutive district title and finished with a final overall record of 18–8 (6–0 district). Eustis ended its season ranked 9th in the Florida Class 5A standings.

Season	Overall record	District record	playoffs	Notes
1990-91	25-4	N/A		district champions
1999-00	N/A	N/A	5th round	state champions
2000-01	N/A	N/A	4th round	elite eight
2000-01	N/A	N/A	4th round	elite eight
2002-03	N/A	N/A	5th round	state champions
2005-06	23-8	8-5	1st round	
2006-07	9-7	2-1		
2007-08	16-6	3-4		
2008-09	14-14	5-4		
2009-10	18-10	4-2	2nd round	
2010-11	24-4	5-0	1st round	district champions
2011-12	22-4	10-0	1st round	district champions
2012-13	22-9	10-0	2nd round	district champions
2013-14	20-9	5-1	2nd round	district champions
2014-15	18-8	6-0	1st round	district champions
2015-16	18-9	8-2	1st round	
2016-17	17-8	5-6		

The Eustis baseball program currently has several players at the Division I level. Today, Eustis Panthers play at the University of South Florida, the University of Florida, Clemson University, and Liberty University to name a few.

=== Football ===
The Eustis Panthers football team has appeared in three state title games (1963, 1965 and 1983). They have two state championship titles '63 and '83, one state runner-up title and 13 district titles.

Playoff appearances (22): 1963, 1965, 1966, 1967, 1968, 1970, 1971, 1972, 1983, 1991, 1993, 1994, 1995, 1996, 1997, 2000, 2001, 2002, 2003, 2005, 2006, 2007, 2016,.

District titles (13): 1965, 1966, 1967, 1968, 1970, 1971, 1972, 1983, 1991, 1994, 1995, 1997, 2005.

Elite eight (8): 1963, 1965, 1966, 1968, 1971, 1983, 1995, 2006.

Final four (6): 1963, 1965, 1966, 1968, 1971, 1983.

State finals (3): 1963, 1965, 1983.

== Notable alumni ==
- Joe Burnett, cornerback for the Calgary Stampeders in the Canadian Football League, formerly played for the Edmonton Eskimos, Pittsburgh Steelers and New York Giants, college: University of Central Florida
- Rod Ferrell, murderer
- Anthony Fieldings, former linebacker for the Dallas Cowboys in the National Football League, college: Morningside College
- Chris Okey, 2nd round pick (43rd overall) in the 2016 MLB draft and catcher for Cincinnati Reds, college: Clemson Tigers
- John Robert Schrieffer, recipient of 1972 Nobel Prize in Physics
- David Walker, former NASA astronaut and US Navy Pilot
- Richard Williams, former running back for the Atlanta Falcons and Houston Oilers in the National Football League, college: Memphis Tigers

Eustis has had athletes from their baseball, softball, basketball, and football programs go on to play for multiple schools at the Division 1 level including; Florida (baseball, basketball & football), Florida State (football), Central Florida (football, volleyball, and softball), Kansas State (football), Vanderbilt (football) and Clemson (baseball).
