= Fort Butler (Murphy, North Carolina) =

19th-century fort in North America

Coordinates: 35.0842°N 84.0408°W

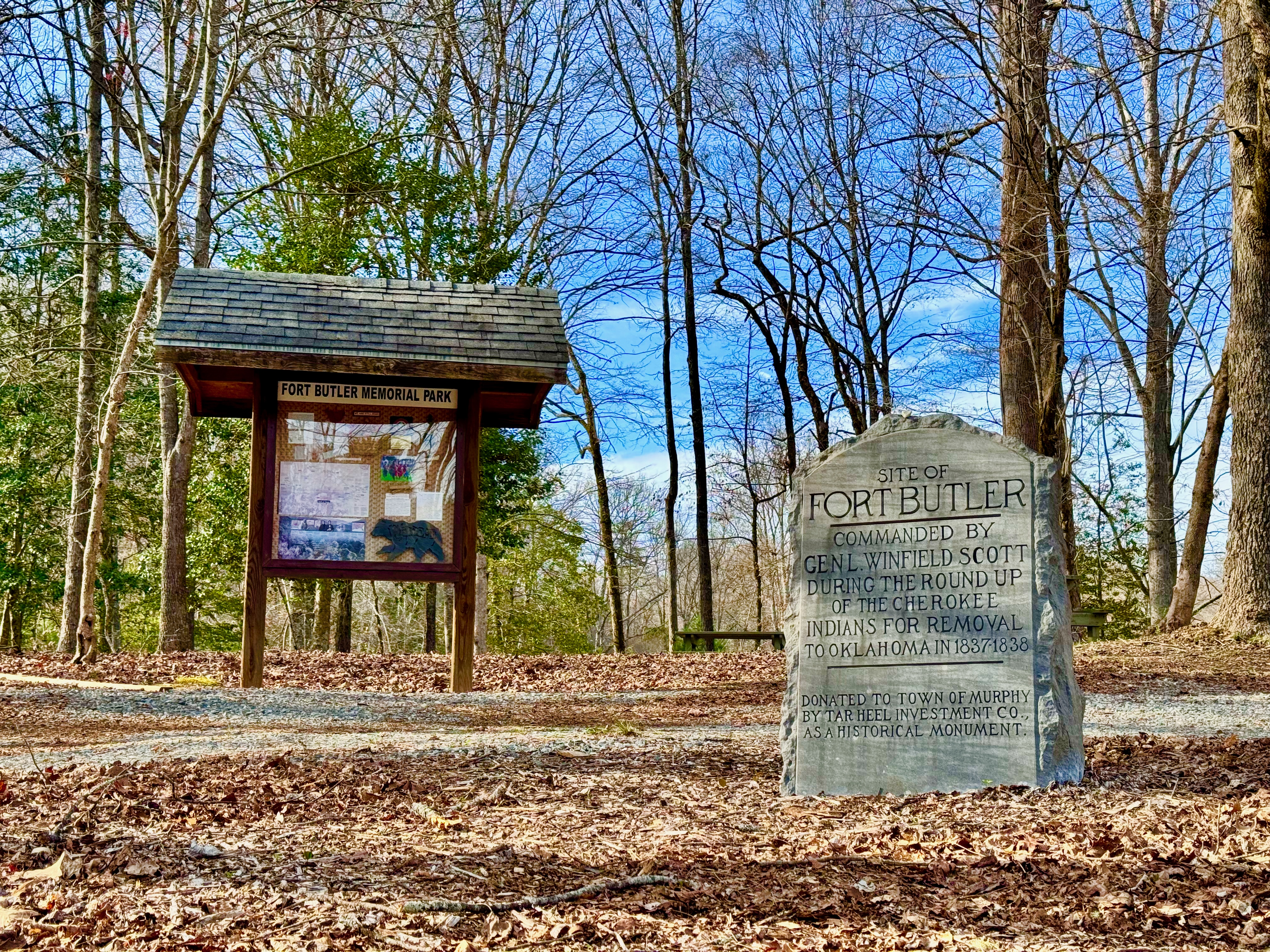
Fort Butler Memorial Park marks the site of the fort today

Fort Butler was an important site during the Cherokee removal known as the Trail of Tears. Located on a hill overlooking present-day Murphy, North Carolina on the Hiwassee River, Fort Butler was the headquarters of the Eastern Division of the U.S. Army overseeing the Cherokee Nation. It was the military force charged with forcing Cherokee emigration.

Fort Butler was located along Hitchcock Street near Lakeside Street in what in the 21st century is a private residential neighborhood. Down the hill from this location, Cherokee Street follows the route of the former Unicoi Turnpike along which the Cherokee were marched to Fort Cass and on to Indian Territory.

Fort Butler, originally named Camp Huntington, was established in July 1836 by General John E. Wool and a force of Tennessee volunteer militia sent to the region to keep order after the ratification of the Treaty of New Echota. The camp was abandoned after a month but then reoccupied in 1837 and renamed Fort Butler after Benjamin Butler, Andrew Jackson’s attorney general. The site was of strategic importance because there the Unicoi Turnpike crossed the Hiwassee River at Christie Ford as well as the road up Valley River to the Cherokee "Valley Towns."

In early 1838 it became clear that most Cherokee would not willingly leave their lands. After a deadline in May passed, the United States Army prepared for forced removal. Fort Butler was enlarged with barracks, officers' quarters, offices, shops, kitchens, and other buildings. General Abraham Eustis took command of the fort in late May 1838. Troops fresh from the Second Seminole War in Florida were assigned to Fort Butler.

The military removal of the Cherokee began in Georgia in late May, but reports of abuse and mistreatment of the prisoners caused General Winfield Scott, the overall commander stationed at Fort Cass, to suspend operations until early June.

Southwest North Carolina was one of the most densely populated regions of the Cherokee Nation and was believed to be an area with the potential for violent resistance. Therefore, General Scott travelled to Fort Butler in order to personally direct the roundup of Cherokee in the region, which began on June 12, 1838.

During the early summer of 1838 more than 3,000 Cherokee prisoners from western North Carolina and northern Georgia passed through Fort Butler en route, via the Unicoi Turnpike, to the larger internment camps at Fort Cass, Tennessee. Unlike the long imprisonment at Fort Cass, most of the prisoners spent only a few days at Fort Butler, although some remained for a few weeks. Approximately 1,000 prisoners were sent to Fort Butler from Fort Hembree in present-day Clay County.

Today the site hosts the Fort Butler Memorial Park, which was erected in the 1970s. In mid-2026, Murphy's town council authorized transferring the property at no cost to the Eastern Band of Cherokee Indians.
