= Henry L. Eustis =

American general

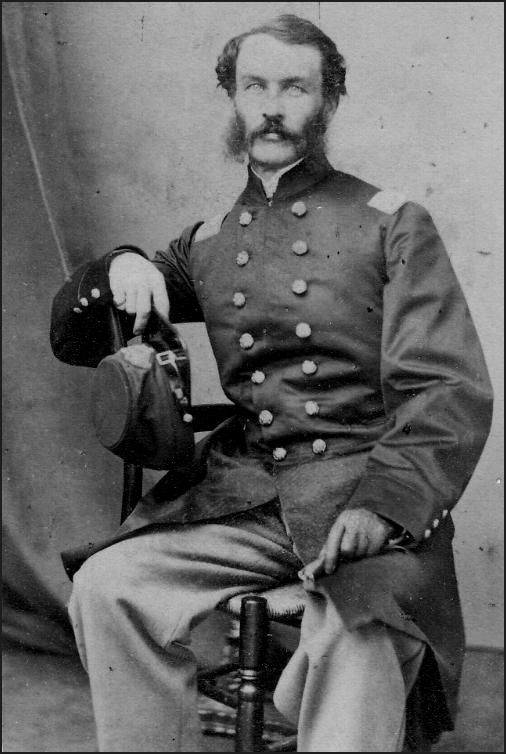
- Henry Lawrence Eustis
- Born: February 1, 1819 near Boston, Massachusetts
- Died: January 11, 1885 (aged 65); Cambridge, Massachusetts
- Burial place: Mount Auburn Cemetery, Cambridge, Massachusetts
- Relatives: Bvt. Brig. Gen. Abraham Eustis (father)
- Military career
- Allegiance: United States of America; Union
- Branch: United States Army; Union Army
- Service years: 1842–1849, 1862–1864
- Rank: Brigadier General
- Commands: 10th Regiment Massachusetts Volunteer Infantry
- Conflicts: American Civil War; Battle of Fredericksburg; Battle of Chancellorsville; Battle of Gettysburg; Overland Campaign
- Other work: College professor and dean, writer

Henry Lawrence Eustis (February 1, 1819 – January 11, 1885) was an American civil engineer, college professor, and soldier who served as a general in the Union Army during the American Civil War.

== Early life and career ==
Henry Eustis was born at Fort Independence near Boston, Massachusetts. His father Abraham Eustis, a career army officer, was stationed there at the time. Henry graduated from Harvard University in 1838 and then attended the United States Military Academy at West Point, New York. After graduating first in his class in 1842, Eustis was assigned to engineering roles, including working on several improvements to the unfinished Fort Warren in Boston Harbor. Eustis taught engineering at West Point from 1847 to 1849. He resigned on November 30, 1849, and took an appointment teaching engineering at Harvard.

== Civil War ==
After the Civil War broke out, Eustis joined the volunteer infantry being raised in Massachusetts. He was commissioned as the new colonel of the 10th Regiment Massachusetts Volunteer Infantry on August 21, 1862. (The regiment had been mustered into the service on June 21, 1861.) He joined the division of Brig. Gen. Darius Couch in the IV Corps, Army of the Potomac. Couch's division served in the Maryland Campaign, but it was not present at the Battle of Antietam.

After the battle, the division became 3rd Division of the VI Corps under Brig. Gen. John Newton. Eustis participated in the Battle of Fredericksburg in the brigade of Brig. Gen. Charles Devens. He then served under Col. William H. Browne in the Chancellorsville campaign. When Browne was wounded at the Battle of Salem Church, Eustis succeeded to command of the brigade. He led the brigade at the Battle of Gettysburg, where his units were in reserve. Eustis became a brigadier general on September 12, 1863. He served in the autumn campaigns of 1863 under Brig. Gen. Henry Dwight Terry, who had taken over after Newton became commander of I corps.

In the reorganization of the Army of the Potomac preceding Ulysses S. Grant's Overland Campaign in 1864, Eustis's brigade was moved to the 2nd Division of VI Corps under Brig. Gen. George W. Getty. Eustis commanded his brigade in the Battle of the Wilderness. After Maj. Gen. John Sedgwick was killed at the Battle of Spotsylvania, Brig. Gen. Horatio Wright became the corps commander. Brig. Gen. David Allen Russell took over Wright's 1st Division and Eustis was moved to the command of Russell's former brigade. He led this brigade at Spotsylvania and the subsequent actions of the army through the Battle of Cold Harbor. Eustis resigned his commission on June 27, 1864, for reasons of "health." It is reported that he was compelled to resign because of his addiction to opium, which caused neglect of military duties.

== Post-war ==
Eustis returned to teaching at Harvard and wrote several technical articles, as well as a genealogy of his family in 1878. He became the dean of the Lawrence Scientific School, later the Harvard School of Engineering and Applied Sciences. He was holding that post when he died in Cambridge, Massachusetts, on January 11, 1885.

General Eustis was buried at Mount Auburn Cemetery in Cambridge.

== See also ==
- List of Massachusetts generals in the American Civil War
- Massachusetts in the American Civil War
