= Mount Dora Center for the Arts =

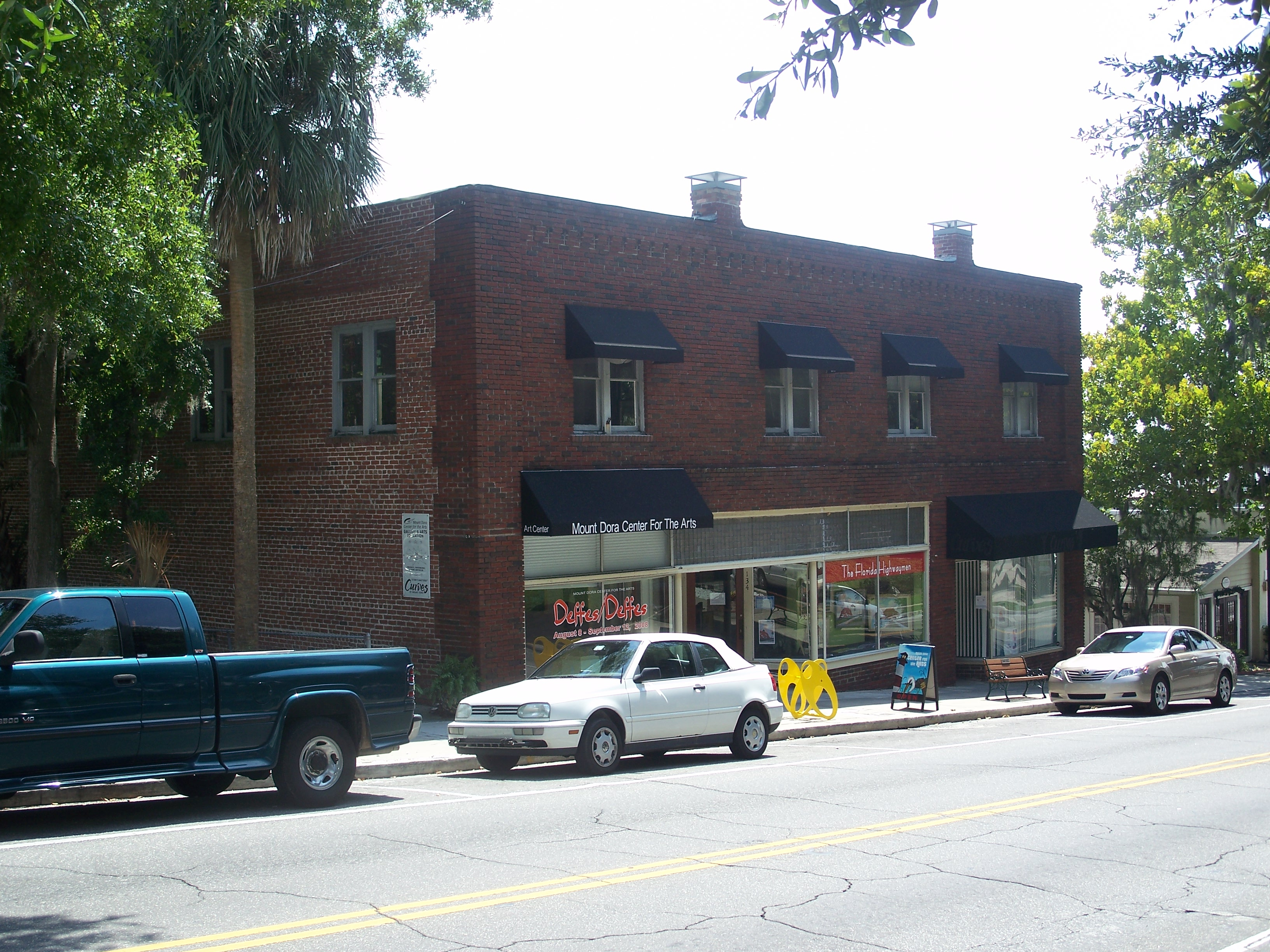

- Location within Florida
- Established: 1985
- Location: 847 East Fifth Avenue; Mount Dora, Florida
- Coordinates: 28.80053°N 81.64391°W
- Type: Art museum
- Director: Janet Gamache
- Website: https://mountdoraart.com/

The Mount Dora Center for the Arts is located at 847 East Fifth Avenue, Mount Dora, Florida. The Center brings art to lives through classes and workshops, gallery exhibits, children's outreach programs, and partnerships with the Art Community. Their annual Art Festival held in February draws more than 200,000 visitors to the City of Mount Dora (pop.15,000) each year.

History: In 1975, a group of art-loving citizens held the first Mount Dora Arts Festival. It was a small event, but it was a big success. It was decided to have an Arts Festival every year.

In 1984, many of these same citizens of Mount Dora banded together to form the Mount Dora Cultural Council. It was their goal to celebrate the arts in Mount Dora, as well as further promote and improve the quality of the Arts Festival. Staffed by volunteers and funded through membership dues and private contributions, the Cultural Council began to grow. The following year, the Cultural Council moved into 138 East 5th Avenue. As time went by, more and more people joined the Cultural Council, and in 1986, the Board of Trustees resolved to change the name to Mount Dora Center for the Arts. The Mount Dora Center for the Arts has provided quality art experiences in the Lake County region of Central Florida ever since.

In 1995, with a 30% down payment and owner-financed mortgage, the MDCA Board of Trustees purchased the building where the Arts Center is currently located.

In March 2022, MDCA sold the building to G3 Development with a Build to Suit agreement to have a new facility built behind the original building on Royellou Lane. As part of the sale agreement, G3 Development agreed to sponsor Mount Dora Center for the Arts annual Arts Festival for 10 years. Shortly after the sale, G3 Development reneged on building the previously agreed to plans and filed an eviction against MDCA. They also stated they no longer intended to sponsor the Mount Dora Arts Festival. Subsequently, G3 Development submitted plans for approval for a different building to the City of Mount Dora using MDCA's name as the applicant. MDCA filed a lawsuit against G3 Development for breach of contract claiming they were duped into selling their building, saying they believed G3 never had any intention of fulfilling promises made at the time of the sale. A court date is pending.

Mount Dora Viva La Frida Festival is an event hosted by Mount Dora Center for the Arts to highlight and celebrate Hispanic influence and importance in the community through visual and performing arts. It is held on the last Saturday of September each year in Donnelly Park in the heart of the City of Mount Dora each year. The event features Latin music, food, tequila tasting, live art and a Frida Khalo look alike contest.

Mount Dora Arts Festival The first Mount Dora Arts Festival was held in 1975. It is a juried event of fine artists and nationally places in the Top 200 consistently by Sunshine Artists Magazine in their annual ranking of Arts and Crafts festivals in the United States. More than 250 fine artists line the downtown streets under white tents to compete for more than $20,000 in prize money. It is held in the first week of February each year and is free to attend.

The Mount Dora Center for the Arts is an IRS Approved 501C-3 Not for Profit.
