= Lake Harris (Florida) =

Lake in the state of Florida, United States

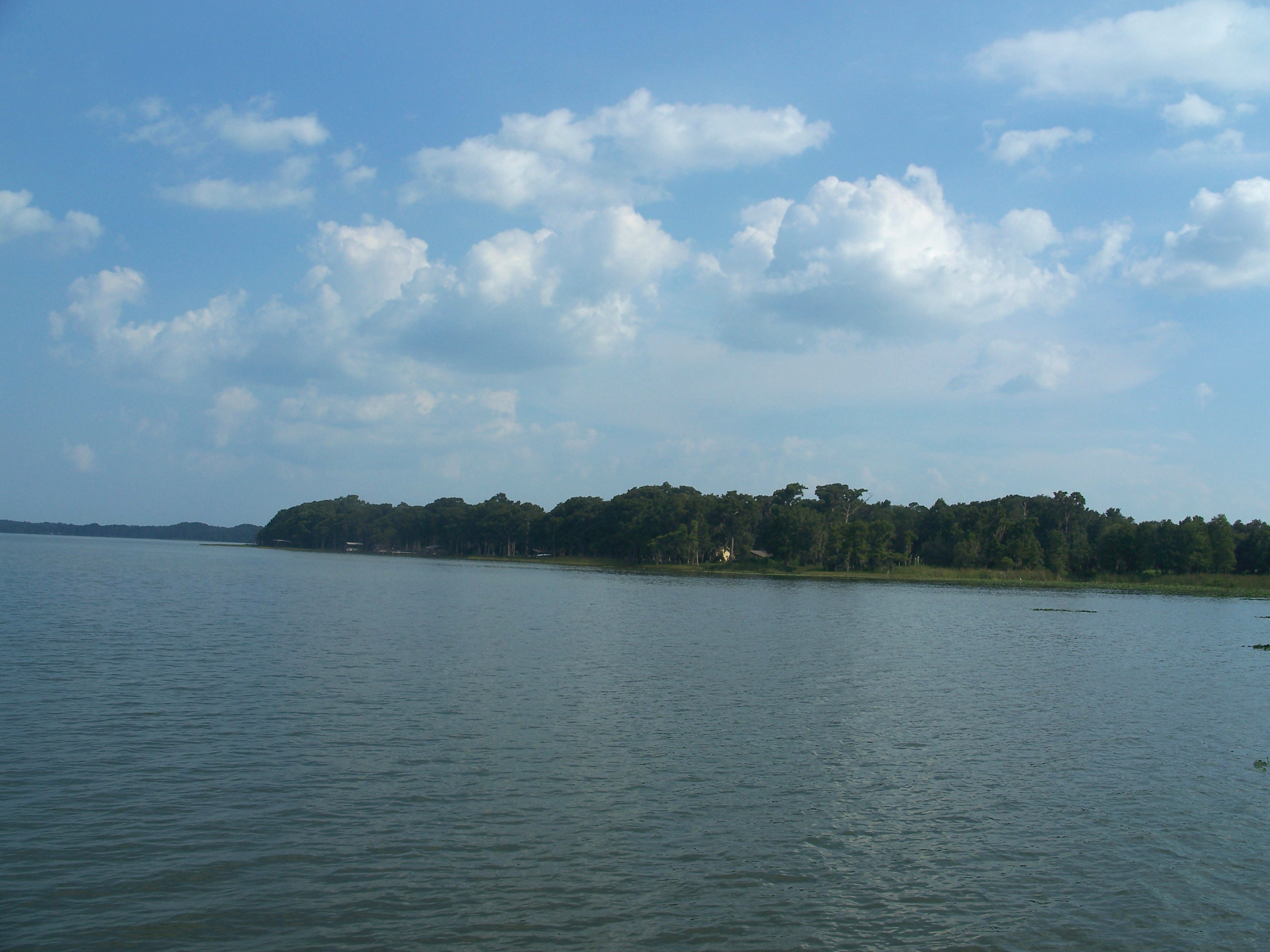
- Looking east from Singletary Park

- Location within Florida Location within the United States
- Location: Lake County, Florida, US
- Coordinates: 28°46′4″N 81°48′57″W
- Basin countries: United States
- Surface area: 13,788 acres (55.80 km^{2})
- Surface elevation: 62 ft (19 m)

Location in Florida

Lake Harris is a lake in Lake County, Florida, United States, 31 miles (50 km) northwest of Orlando. It is part of the Upper Ocklawaha River Basin, a sub-watershed of the St. Johns River. It is one of seven lakes in the Harris Chain of Lakes or "Ocklawaha Chain of Lakes".

Lake Harris is the largest lake entirely in Lake County at 13,788 acres (56 km^{2}). Little Lake Harris is a bay located east of SR 19; the combined area of the two lakes exceeds 15,000 acres (61 km^{2}). The lake's northeastern shore is a landing approach zone for Leesburg International Airport. It is a harbor city for Leesburg, at the northwestern shore of the lake. At the westernmost point of the lake is U.S. Route 27/SR 25.

Lake Harris' primary inflow is at its southwestern shore from the Palatlakaha River, which originates from the Clermont chain of lakes to the south. Other inflowing rivers include Helena Run and discharge from many small springs in Yalaha. Lake Harris' depth is much greater than Lake Okeechobee to the south, with many deeper holes and ledges. The lake is surrounded by sandhills and cypress trees, part of the Central Florida Ridge. This region has the highest elevations in Central Florida, including Sugarloaf Mountain reaching 312 feet (95 m) above sea level. Compared to the rest of Florida, which is relatively flat, it is quite hilly.

There are three public launching ramps on Lake Harris; off U.S. Route 27 to the west, Venetian Gardens in Leesburg, and Hickory Point near the Howey-in-the-Hills bridge off SR 19. There is a small but serviceable ramp on the east side of Little Lake Harris in Astatula. The lake is generally lined with cattail and bullrush. The depth in these tall grasses normally ranges from 2 to 5 feet (0.61 to 1.52 m). The bottom is mostly hard sand, except for some marshy areas where the bottom is considerably softer. These sheltered areas around the shore can offer a good place to fish during inclement weather.

Lake Harris derives its name from Ebenezer Jackson Harris, a pioneer resident who lived at Yalaha on the south side of the lake in the 1840s. Lake Harris had been originally called "Lake Eustis" since 1823, in honor of Colonel Abraham Eustis. A freshwater lake to the north, the modern-day Lake Eustis, now honors the veteran officer. Lake Eustis is connected by the Dead River directly to Lake Harris, which was also known by its Seminole name Astatula.

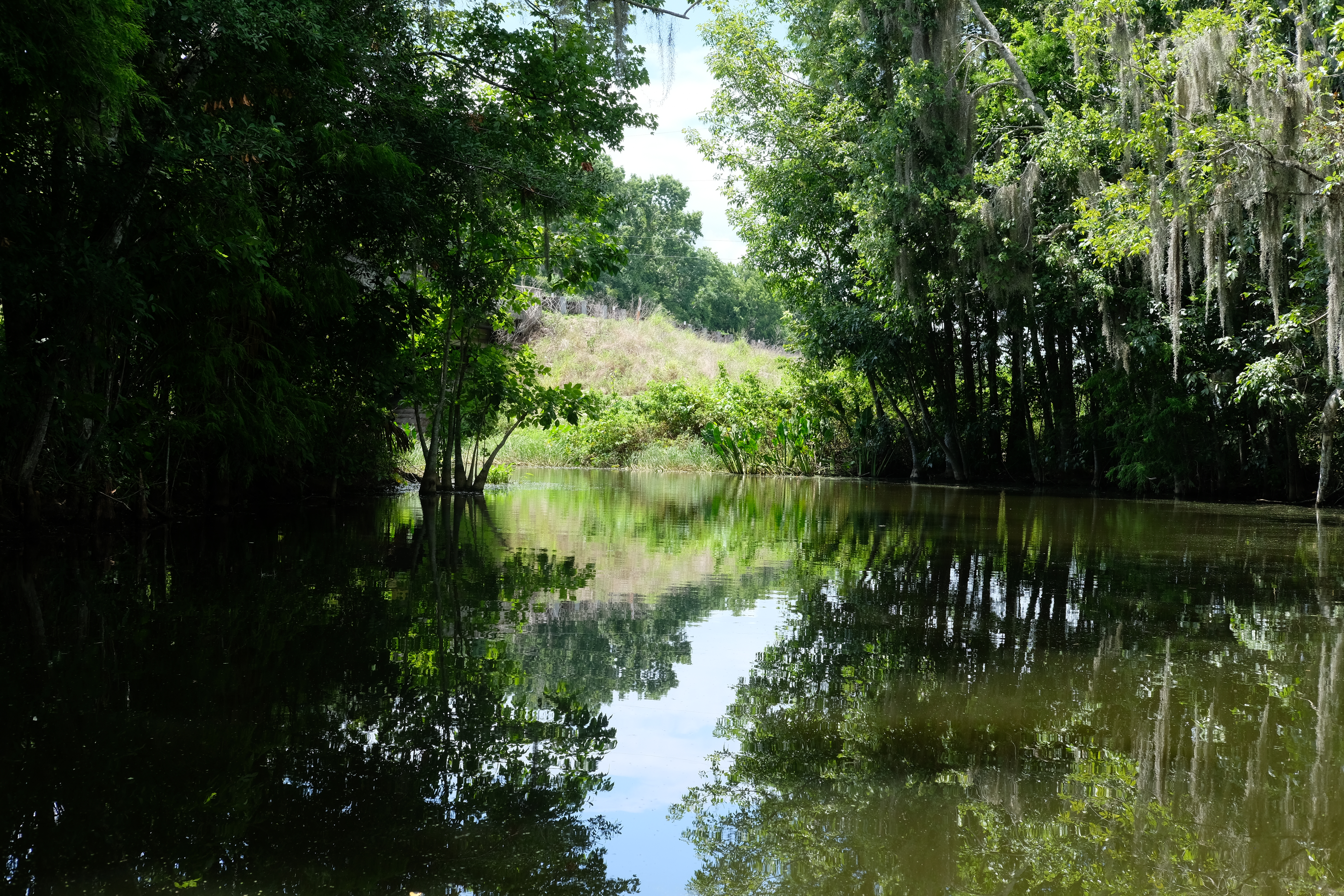
View of Helena Run channel in Lake Harris.

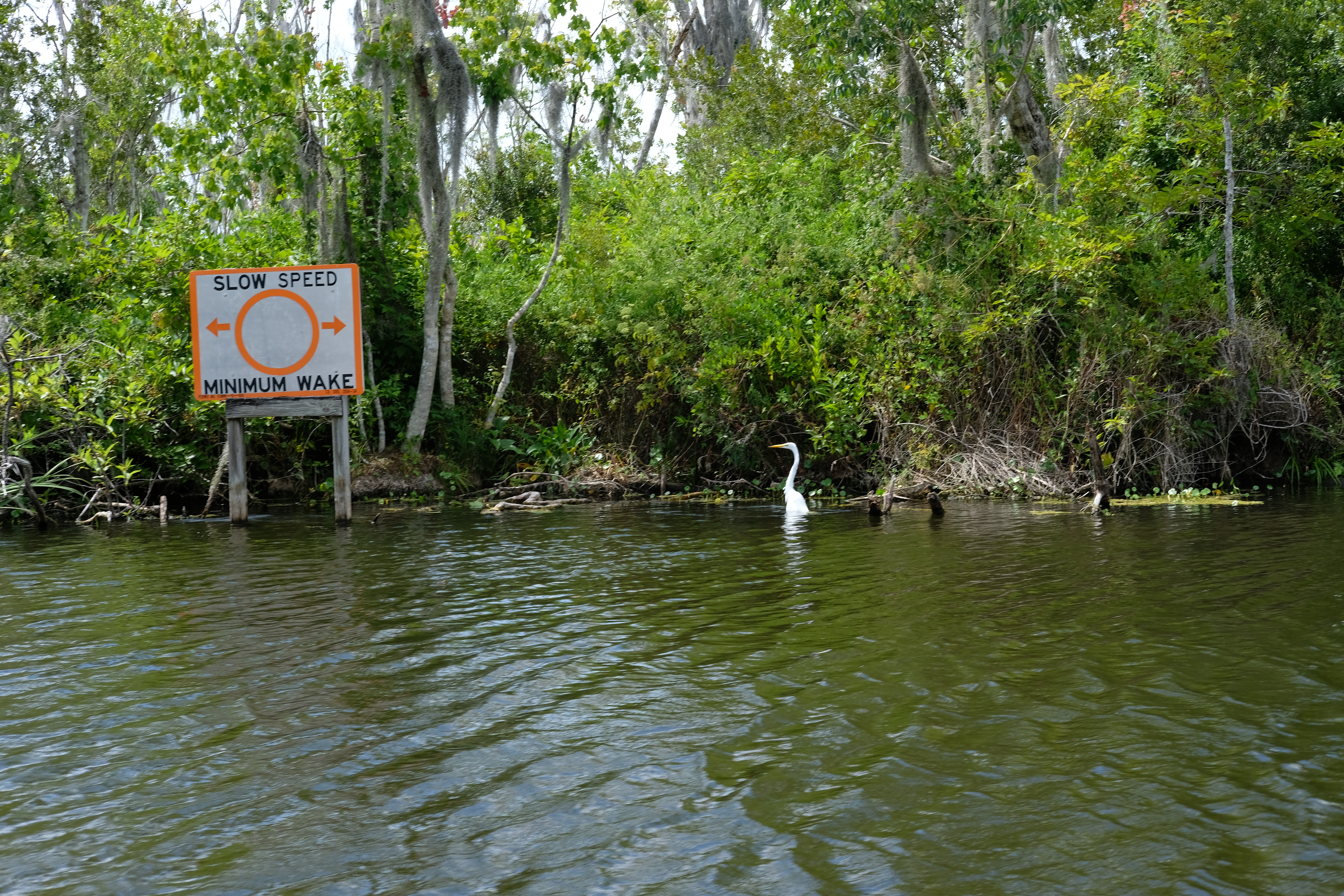
Great egret in Helena Run channel in Lake Harris

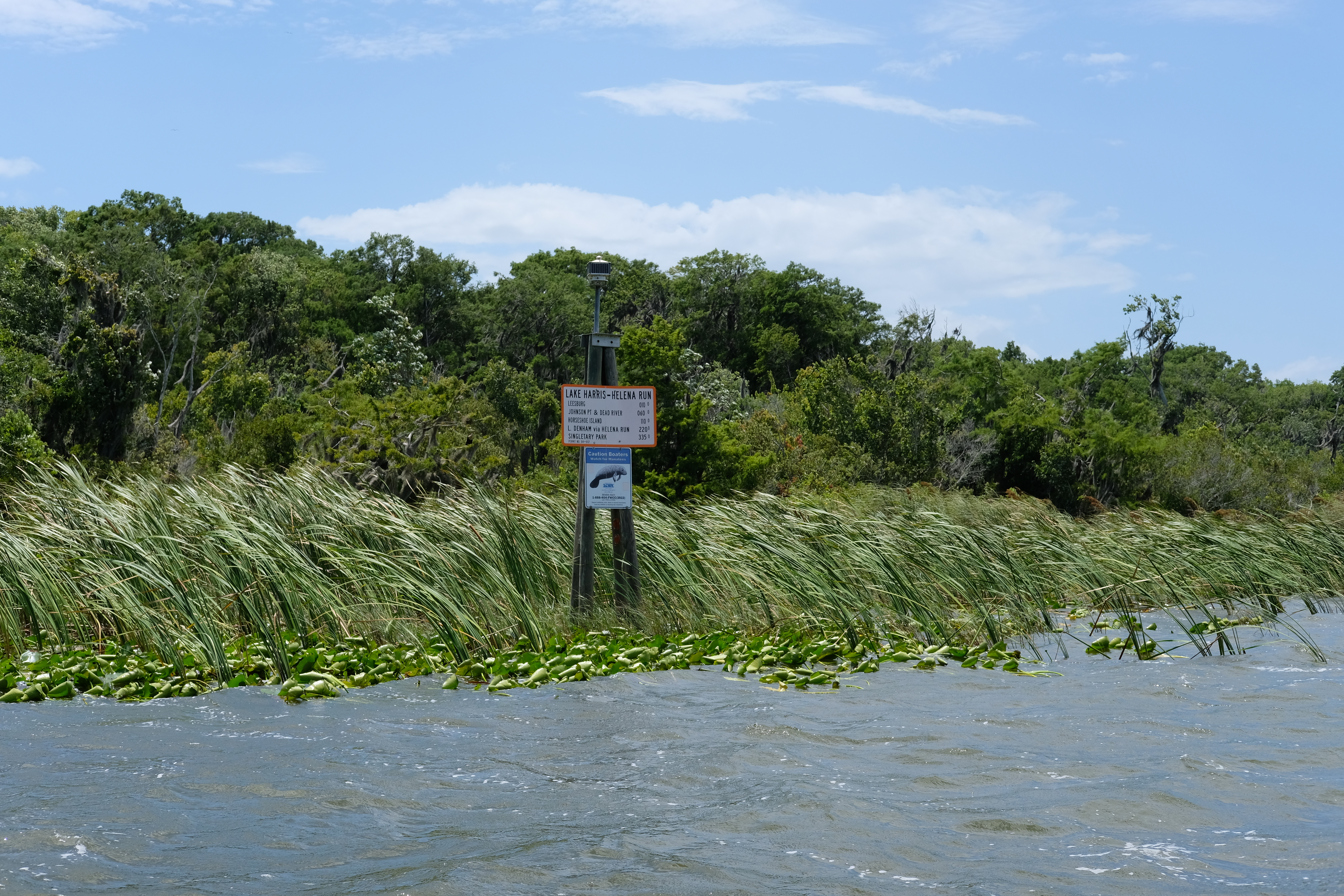
Manatee Sign

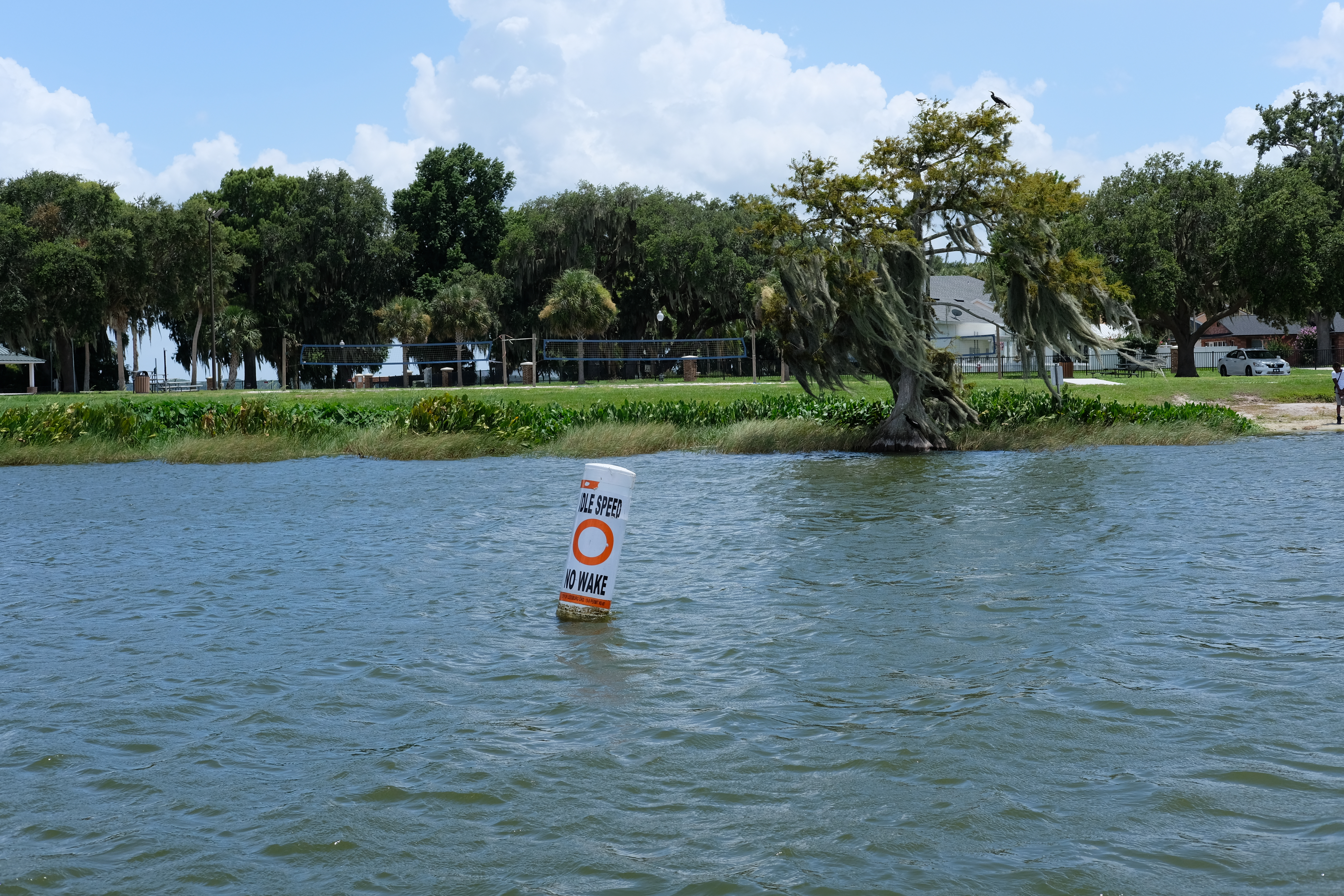
Buoy on Lake Harris
