= Eustis, Florida =

City in Florida, United States

- City
- City of Eustis
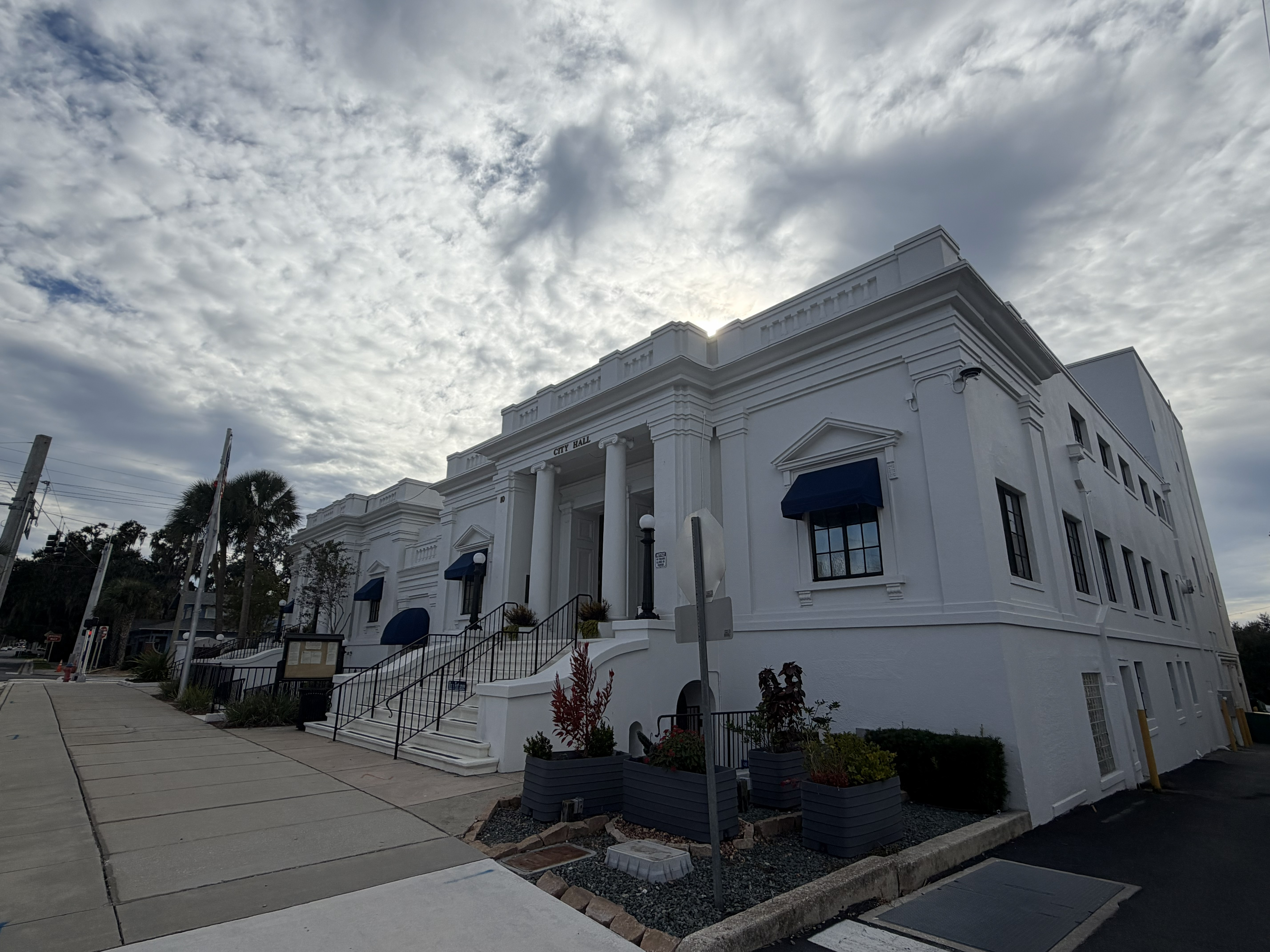
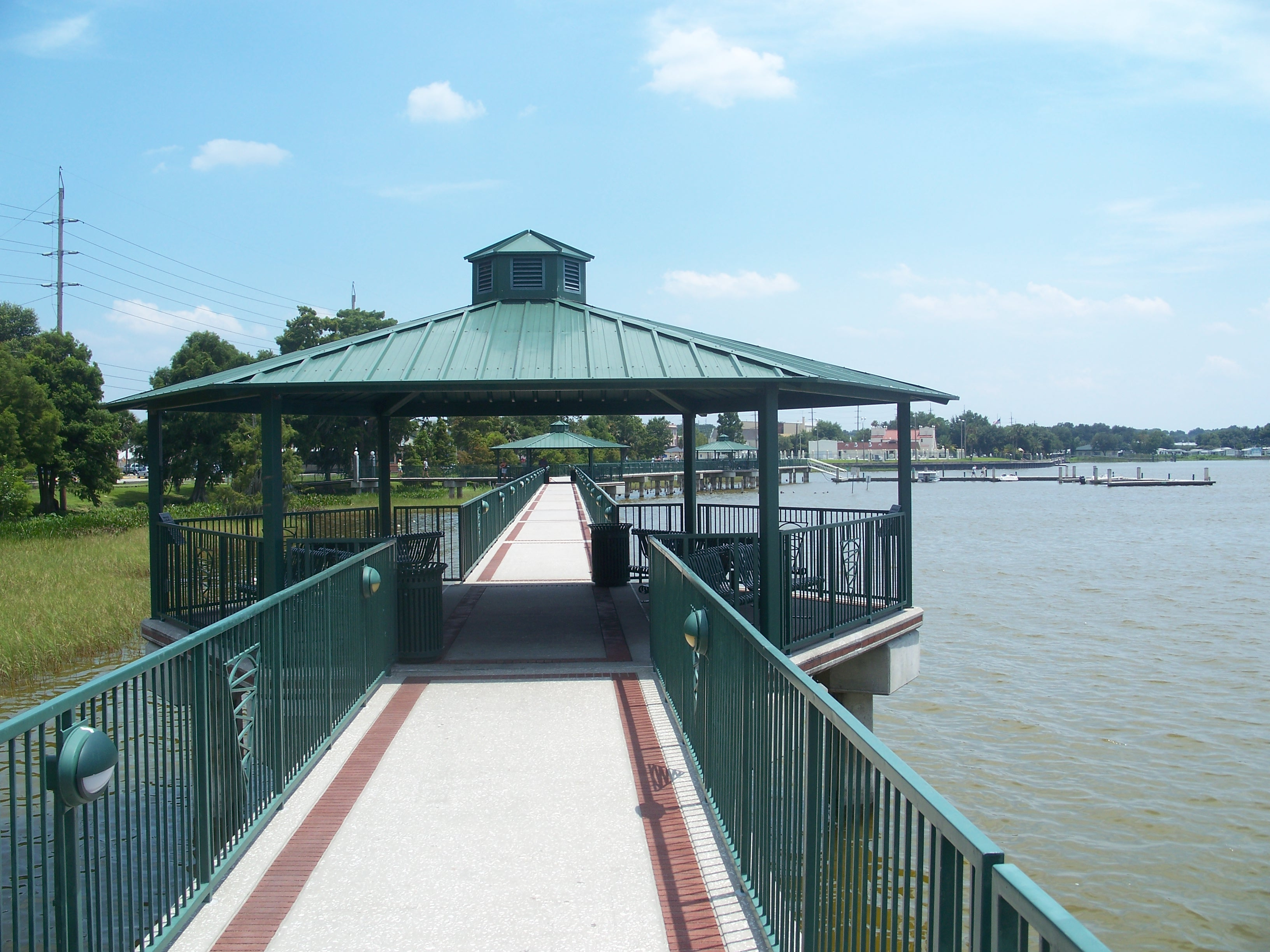
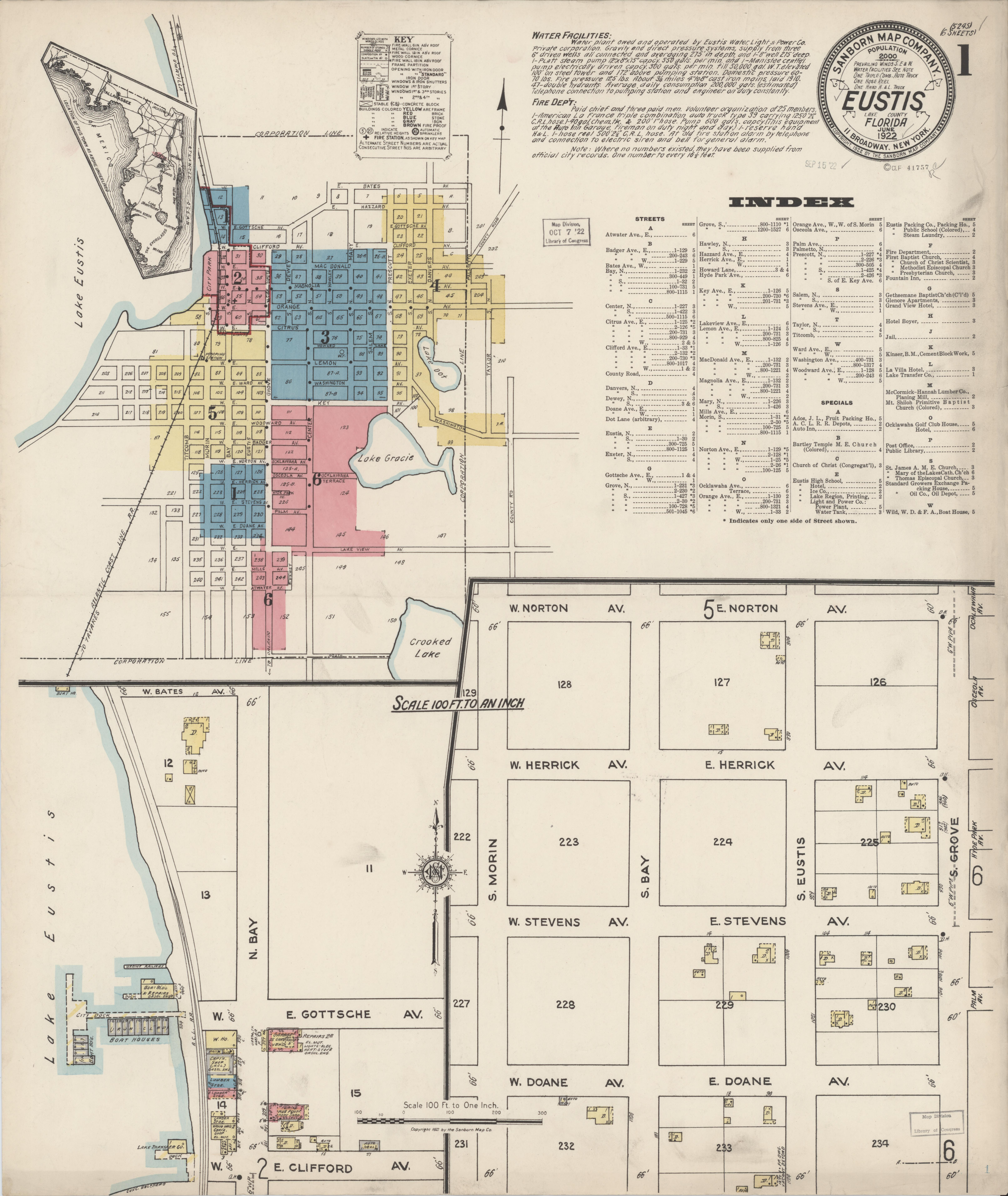
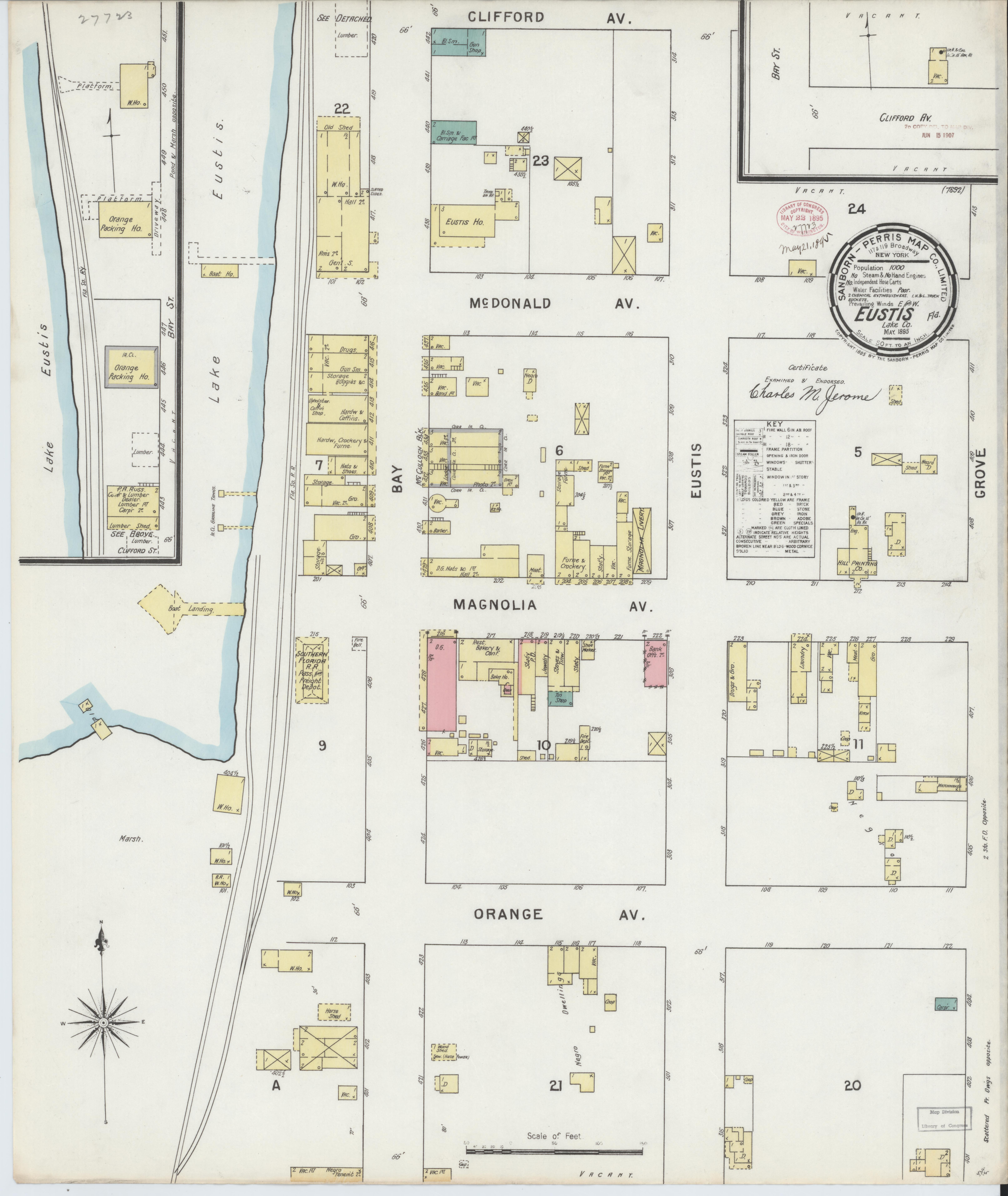
- Eustis City Hall Boardwalk on Lake Eustis 1922 Map 1895 Map

- Seal
- Nickname: America's Hometown
- Motto(s): Culture, Opportunity, Vitality
- Location in Lake County and the state of Florida
- Coordinates: 28°51′23″N 81°40′38″W
- Country: United States
- State: Florida
- County: Lake
- Established: 1883

Government
  - Type: Council-Manager Form of Government
  - Mayor: Emily Lee

Area
  - Total: 13.03 sq mi (33.75 km^{2})
  - Land: 11.10 sq mi (28.75 km^{2})
  - Water: 1.93 sq mi (5.00 km^{2})
- Elevation: 75 ft (23 m)

Population (2020)
  - Total: 23,189
  - Estimate (2025): 25,483
  - Density: 2,089/sq mi (806.5/km^{2})
- Time zone: UTC-5
  - Summer (DST): UTC-4
- ZIP codes: 32726, 32727, 32736
- Area code: 352
- FIPS code: 12-21350
- Website: City of Eustis official website

Eustis is a city in Lake County, Florida, United States. It lies about 35 miles northwest of Orlando, Florida and is part of the Orlando–Kissimmee–Sanford Metropolitan Statistical Area. The population in the city proper was 23,189 at the 2020 census.

== History ==
Eustis is one of several towns in Lake County that trace their origins to the 1870s, a post-Civil War era when settlers moved southward into the Florida frontier. The city is named after then Colonel Abraham Eustis, a U.S. Army officer who served during the Seminole Wars and skirmished along the south shore of what is now Lake Eustis, near Tavares.

=== Early settlement and founding (1825–1870s) ===
The U.S. government opened the region for homesteading in the 1850s, though settlement was delayed by the Civil War. Surveying was completed in 1875, and by 1876, A. S. Pendry had homesteaded on the eastern shore of Lake Eustis and planted a citrus grove. In 1877, he opened the Ocklawaha Hotel and operated a post office from its lobby under the name "Pendryville." By 1879, the settlement's name had changed to Lake Eustis, and then simply "Eustis."

=== Railroad and incorporation (1880s) ===
In 1880, the St. Johns and Lake Eustis Railway reached Fort Mason, north of Eustis. The first train coming from Astor to Fort Mason, where passengers and freight made lake steamer connections to Leesburg, Helena, Yalaha, Bloomfield, Lane Park, and Tavares. The town grew rapidly with new stores, schools, a bank, and churches.

In 1881, Clifford and Smith built the town's first general store building. By 1883, residents voted to drop “Lake” from the name and incorporated the City of Eustis. D.W. Herrick was elected the first mayor.

In 1886, Dr. J. H. Potter and Professor Byron F. Marsh established the Eustis Seminary, a school serving grades 1–12 near today's Eustis High School. The school closed in 1895 due to financial constraints.

=== Citrus boom and the Great Freeze (1890s) ===
Citrus farming became a cornerstone of the Eustis economy in the late 19th century. The area was surrounded by orange groves, and packing houses shipped produce to northern markets. However, the Great Freeze of 1894–1895, followed by another in 1898–1899, devastated crops and crippled the local economy. Despite this, Eustis rebounded and became known as the “Orange Capital of the World.” The United States Department of Agriculture established a research station and lab in Eustis, pioneering the study of citrus plant diseases and hybridization.

=== Early 1900s–Great Depression (1900–1930s) ===
By the early 1900s, Eustis had become a popular winter resort, with the Ocklawaha Hotel catering to wealthy visitors. In 1902, the city began an annual George Washington's Birthday celebration, now called GeorgeFest—the longest consecutively running annual festival in the United States honoring Washington.

The Dixie Highway and growing use of automobiles brought increased tourism. In the 1910s, the Atlantic Coast Line Railroad Depot on Magnolia Avenue served train travelers. Between 1923 and 1927, Eustis City Hall was constructed in Neoclassical style during the Florida land boom. It now houses municipal offices and is listed on the National Register of Historic Places.

=== 21st century ===
In 2003, Florida Hospital Waterman, now AdventHealth Waterman Hospital, relocated from its original site in downtown Eustis to its current site in Tavares, Florida.

== Arts and Culture ==
=== On the National Register of Historic Places ===
- Clifford House (1910)
- Eustis City Hall (1927)
- Eustis Commercial Historic District
- Ferran Park and the Alice McClelland Memorial Bandshell (1926 and 1936)
- Gethsemane Baptist Church (1914)
- Grand Magnolia Inn (1912)
- The Ferran House (1908)
- Woman's Club of Eustis (1930)

== Geography ==
According to the United States Census Bureau, the city has a total area of 13.03 square miles (33.7 km^{2}), of which 11.10 square miles (28.7 km^{2}) is land and 1.93 square miles (5.0 km^{2}) (13.28%) is water.

Eustis is located in central Florida on the eastern shore of Lake Eustis, one of the Harris Chain of Lakes Harris Chain of Lakes. The city's terrain is relatively flat, approximately 79 feet (24 meters, with numerous lakes in the surrounding area.

== Climate ==
Average Monthly Temperatures in Eustis, Florida
Month	Jan	Feb	Mar	Apr	May	Jun	Jul	Aug	Sep	Oct	Nov	Dec
Average High °F	69	72	76	81	87	89	90	90	88	82	76	71
Average Temperature °F	58	61	66	71	76	80	81	81	79	73	66	61
Average Low °F	50	52	57	62	68	73	75	75	73	66	58	53

=== Plant hardiness (Agricultural climate) ===
Eustis, Florida, falls within USDA Hardiness Zone 9b. This zone offers a long growing season and is conducive to a diverse range of plants.

== Demographics ==
=== Racial and ethnic composition ===
Eustis Racial Composition (in Zip Code 32726)
Race	Pop 2010	Pop 2020	% 2010	% 2020
White	12,606	14,075	67.93%	60.70%
Hispanic or Latino (any race)	2,202	3,934	11.87%	16.96%
Black or African American	3,152	3,779	16.98%	16.30%
Asian	205	307	1.10%	1.32%
Native American or Alaska Native	62	45	0.33%	0.19%
Pacific Islander or Native Hawaiian	1	12	0.01%	0.05%
Some other race	21	85	0.11%	0.37%
Two or more races/Multiracial	309	952	1.67%	4.11%
Total	18,558	23,189	100.00%	100.00%

=== Population ===
The 2023 U.S. Census American Community Survey 5-Year estimates ZIP Code 32726 and 32736, which cover Eustis and surrounding communities in Lake County, Florida, have a combined population of approximately 35,467 residents. There was no data for zip code 32727. 32726 accounts for 23,885 people, while 32736 includes 11,582. The population is relatively evenly distributed by gender, with 32726 slightly skewed toward females (52.4%) and 32736 exhibiting near parity.

The 2025 population estimate is 25,300 people residing in the city of Eustis. These population numbers do not account for people living in the county area of Eustis (zip code 32736), which is estimated to include an additional 12,000 people.

Eustis also serves as the center for many small communities of rural East Lake County, including Cassia and Pine Lakes. These communities are not reflected in the Census Bureau's city statistics, but make up for the vast discrepancy in county-to-city statistics. When the rural statistics are compiled into the city stats, the total population of Eustis topped 50,000 in 2000 according the US Census.

=== Population by decade ===
Historical population
Census	Pop.	Note	%±
1900	411		—
1910	910		121.4%
1920	1,193		31.1%
1930	2,835		137.6%
1940	2,930		3.4%
1950	4,005		36.7%
1960	2,106		−47.4%
1970	2,081		−1.2%
1980	9,453		354.3%
1990	12,967		37.2%
2000	15,106		16.5%
2010	18,558		22.9%
2020	23,189		25.0%
2025 (est.)	25,483		9.9%

=== 2020 census ===
As of the 2020 census, Eustis had a population of 23,189. The median age was 43.1 years. 20.5% of residents were under the age of 18 and 22.5% of residents were 65 years of age or older. For every 100 females there were 91.3 males, and for every 100 females age 18 and over there were 86.5 males age 18 and over. 99.7% of residents lived in urban areas, while 0.3% lived in rural areas.

In 2020, there were 9,405 households in Eustis, including 5,485 family households; 27.9% had children under the age of 18 living in them. Of all households, 41.9% were married-couple households, 18.9% were households with a male householder and no spouse or partner present, and 32.0% were households with a female householder and no spouse or partner present. About 30.2% of all households were made up of individuals and 15.5% had someone living alone who was 65 years of age or older.

In 2020, there were 10,382 housing units, of which 9.4% were vacant. The homeowner vacancy rate was 1.6% and the rental vacancy rate was 7.1%.

Racial composition as of the 2020 census
Race	Number	Percent
White	15,179	65.5%
Black or African American	3,855	16.6%
American Indian and Alaska Native	90	0.4%
Asian	329	1.4%
Native Hawaiian and Other Pacific Islander	15	0.1%
Some other race	1,360	5.9%
Two or more races	2,361	10.2%
Hispanic or Latino (of any race)	3,934	17.0%

=== Other census data ===
In 2020, there were 1,762 veterans living in the city and 12.2% were foreign born persons. There were 2.55 persons per household. 92.8% of the households had a computer and 87.1% of households had a broadband internet subscription.

Of the population older than 25 years in 2020, 86.9% had a high school degree or higher and 19.0% of that same population had a bachelor's degree or higher. 11.7% of the population 65 years and older lived with a disability and 19.1% of that same population did not have health insurance. 6.0% were under 5 years old, 20.7% were under 18 years old, 21.0% were 65 years and older, and 51.9% of the population were female.

In 2020, the median household income was $52,074 and the per capita income was $26,974. 16.0% of the population lived below the poverty threshold. The population per square mile was 2,123.7.

=== 2010 census ===
As of the 2010 United States census, there were 18,558 people, 7,491 households, and 4,695 families residing in the city.

== Education ==
=== Primary and secondary education ===
Public education in Eustis is overseen by Lake County Schools, the county-wide public school district. Eustis has two elementary schools: Eustis Elementary School (established in 1925) and Eustis Heights Elementary. The city also has one middle school, Eustis Middle School, serving grades 6–8. Eustis High School Curtright Campus, established in 1925, is dedicated solely to 9th-grade students. Eustis High School (established in 1886) serves the city's high school 10th, 11th, and 12th-grade students.

Eustis is also home to a public charter school, Alee Academy, which provides alternative and vocational-focused high school education.

=== Post-secondary education ===
Eustis hosts the main campus of Lake Technical College, a public vocational and technical school offering programs in healthcare, automotive technology, welding, culinary arts, and emergency services.

Nearby Lake-Sumter State College offers two-year degrees and transfer programs. The University of Central Florida (UCF) is located approximately 43 miles from Eustis, and the University of Florida is about 80 miles away.

=== Public library and lifelong learning ===
Eustis is served by the Eustis Memorial Library, which is part of the Lake County Library System. The library offers books, digital resources, educational programs, and community meeting spaces.

Educational exhibits, workshops, and cultural programs are also provided by local organizations such as the Clifford House Museum and Arching Oaks Art and Culture Center (a traditional Japanese cultural center).

== Notable people ==
- Edgar James Banks, diplomat, antiquarian, and novelist
- Tzimon Barto, classical pianist
- Gwendolyn B. Bennett, Harlem Renaissance poet and artist
- Rod Brewer, MLB professional baseball player
- Joe Burnett, NFL professional football player
- Kerry Carpenter, MLB professional baseball player
- Jeff Coffey, musician who joined rock group Chicago in October 2016
- Keon Ellis, NBA professional basketball player
- Anthony Fieldings, NFL professional football player
- Kenny Green, NBA professional basketball player
- David Hobby, photojournalist and founder of Strobist.com
- Solomon Jones, NBA professional basketball player
- Kathryn Joosten, actress
- Hughie Lee-Smith, artist
- Jonathan Lucroy, MLB professional baseball player
- Kristin Ludecke, beauty queen
- Thomas McClary, singer/songwriter and founding member of The Commodores
- Chris Okey, MLB professional baseball player
- Michael Ray, country music singer
- Jon Schneck, guitarist in alternative rock band Relient K
- John Robert Schrieffer, physicist and winner of the 1972 Nobel Prize in Physics
- Brady Singer, MLB professional baseball player
- Patricia Sullivan, political activist
- David Walker, astronaut
- Gunner Wright, actor
