= Lake Yale =

Lake in the state of Florida, United States

- Location within Florida
- Location: Lake County, Florida
- Coordinates: 28°55′00″N 81°44′20″W
- Type: lake
- Surface area: 4,020 acres (1,630 ha)

Lake Yale is a lake in Lake County, Florida north of the community of Grand Island and west of the city of Umatilla. It is around 4,020 acres (1,630 ha) in area with a drainage basin of 15,394 acres (6,230 ha).

Lake Yale is mostly surrounded by marshland and sandy hills The Lake Yale Baptist Conference Center is on the west shore. There is only one island on the lake, Rabbit Island near its eastern shore. It is connected to Lake Griffin by the Yale-Griffin canal. The canal runs through the Emeralda Marsh Conservation Area and is often overgrown with vegetation and unnavigable by boat. There is boat access into the lake via a ramp in Marsh Memorial Park in the southeast corner. The lake bottom is sandy.
