= Dead River (Lake County, Florida) =

River in Florida, United States

Coordinates: 28°48′49″N 81°45′48″W

Location
- Country: United States
- State: Florida

Physical characteristics
- Source
  - location: Lake Eustis
  - elevation: 18 m (59 ft)
- Mouth
  - location: Lake Harris

The Dead River, found in Lake County, Florida, USA, serves as the division between the cities of Tavares and Leesburg. The Dead River connects Lake Eustis and Lake Harris. The only roadway to cross the river is U.S. Highway 441/SR 44 near the river's northern mouth toward Lake Eustis.
