= Lake Eustis =

Lake in the state of Florida, United States

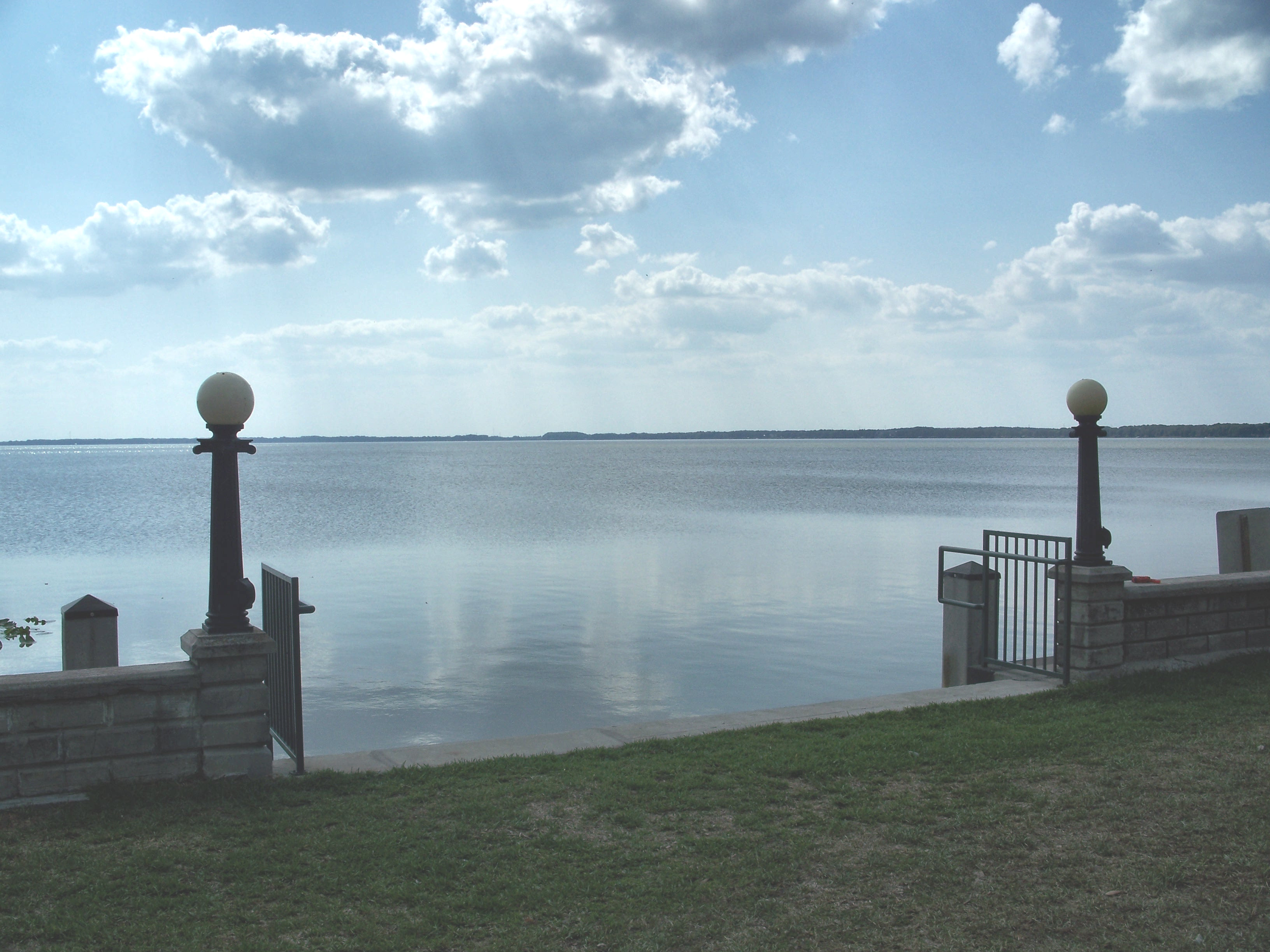
- Lake Eustis, looking west from Ferran Park

- Location within Florida
- Location: Lake County, Florida
- Coordinates: 28°50′56″N 81°43′31″W
- Type: lake
- Surface area: 7,000 acres (28 km^{2})

Lake Eustis is located in Central Florida, west of the city of Eustis. It covers approximately 7,000 acres (28 km^{2}). It is spring fed and is a member of the Harris Chain of Lakes, and is connected to Lake Harris by means of the Dead River. It is also connected to the St. Johns River via Haines Creek to Lake Griffin, and the Ocklawaha River; and is connected to Lake Dora via the Dora Canal. The St. Johns River continues north to Jacksonville and the Atlantic Ocean, thus providing a connection from Lake Eustis to the Atlantic Ocean.

Other communities along the shores of Lake Eustis include Grand Island to the north, Haines Creek to the northwest and Tavares on the southeastern shore.

Eustis Lake Walk built over and connected to the eastern shores of Lake Eustis affords sunset views and 20 boat slips and 4 gazebos amid shore front lake waters.

Sailing and fishing are some of the activities available at the lake.

== Text from "Florida: The March of Progress" ==
For a historical look at Lake County waters, this was written in the 1930s:

amid the slopes and waters of beautiful Lake County, are Leesburg, Eustis, Tavares, and Mount Dora, all possessed of excellent tourist accommodations and such natural and man-made beauty, combined with all sorts of sport advantages, that the sport-loving visitor is thrilled.

Bass fishing surpasses anything you have ever known in that line. Citrus fruits and other products abound. Golf courses are found in every community. As an all-year resort section, this is hard to equal.

== Lake Eustis pupfish ==
The Lake Eustis and the nearby lakes is the sole home of a species of pupfish named the Lake Eustis pupfish (cyprinodon variegatus hubbsi). The Florida Fish and Wildlife Conservation Commission list the fish as a state species of special concern that is imperiled due to its small geographic distribution in heavily populated central Florida.
