= Robert Singleton =

Robert or Bobby Singleton may refer to:

- Robert Singleton (priest) (died 1544), English Roman Catholic priest
- Robert Singleton (activist) (born 1936), Freedom Rider during 1961
- Robert Corbet Singleton (1810–1881), Irish academic and hymnwriter
- Robert S. Singleton (born 1933), American engineer and inventor
- Bobby Singleton (politician), American politician in Alabama
- Bobby Singleton (police officer), Northern Ireland police officer
- Bob Singleton, protagonist of Captain Singleton, a novel by Daniel Defoe

== See also ==
- Robert Singleton-Salmon (1897–1970), British tea planter, businessman and a member of parliament
