= Singleton (surname) =

Singleton is a surname. Notable people with the surname include:

- Al Singleton (born 1975), American football linebacker
- Alvin Singleton (born 1940), American composer
- Antron Singleton, known as Big Lurch (born 1976), American rapper and cannibal
- Benjamin "Pap" Singleton (1809–1892), African American separatist leader
- Billy Singleton (born 1968), British basketball player
- C. T. Singleton, Jr., (1905–1977), American admiral
- Charles Laverne Singleton (1959–2004), executed inmate
- Charles Singleton (songwriter) (1913–1985), American songwriter
- Charles S. Singleton (1909–1985), American critic of literature
- Chris Singleton (musician) (born 1977), Irish musician
- Chris Singleton (American football) (born 1967), American football player
- Chris Singleton (baseball) (born 1972), American baseball player
- DeShon Singleton (born 2003), American football player
- Eric Singleton Jr. (born 2005), American football player
- Frederick W. Singleton (1858–1941), New York assemblyman
- George Singleton, (born 1958), American writer
- Gordon Singleton (born 1956), Canadian Olympic cyclist
- Harry Singleton (1877–1948), English footballer
- Helen Singleton (born 1932), American civil rights activist
- Henry Earl Singleton (1916–1999), co-founder of Teledyne
- IronE Singleton (born 1975), American actor
- James Singleton (basketball) (born 1981), American basketball player
- Jim Singleton (born 1931), New Orleans politician
- John Singleton (1968–2019), American film director, producer, and screenwriter
- John Singleton (Australian entrepreneur) (born 1942), Australian entrepreneur
- Jon Singleton (born 1991), American baseball player
- J. R. Singleton (born 2002), American football player
- Ken Singleton (born 1947), American baseball player and sportscaster
- Keshaun Singleton, American football player
- Kenneth Singleton (born 1951), American economist
- Lawrence Singleton (1927–2001), American criminal
- Malachi Singleton (born 2004), American football player
- Mark Singleton (actor) (1919–1986), British actor
- Mark Singleton (politician) (1762–1840), Anglo-Irish politician
- Michael Singleton (1913–2002), English cricketer
- Mike Singleton (1951–2012), British programmer
- Millard F. Singleton (1859–1939), African-American political leader and civil servant
- Nicholas Singleton (born 2004), American football player
- Penny Singleton (1908–2003), American actress
- Robert Singleton (priest) (died 1544), English Roman Catholic priest
- Robert Singleton (activist) (born 1936), Freedom Rider during 1961
- Robert Corbet Singleton (1810–1881), Irish academic and hymnwriter
- Robert S. Singleton (born 1933), American engineer and inventor
- Roger Singleton-Turner, British television director
- Sandy Singleton (1914–1999), English cricketer
- Theresa A. Singleton (born 1952), American archaeologist and writer
- Thomas Singleton (academic) (1552–1614), Vice-Chancellor of the University of Oxford
- Thomas Singleton (priest) (1783–1842), Archdeacon of Northumberland
- Thomas D. Singleton (died 1833), US Representative from South Carolina
- Tommy Singleton (1940–2005), English footballer
- Valerie Singleton (born 1937), British television and radio presenter
- Walter K. Singleton (1944–1967), Medal of Honor recipient
- William Singleton (politician) (died 1677), English politician in the English Civil War
- William Dean Singleton (born 1951), founder and CEO of MediaNews Group
- Zutty Singleton (1898–1975), American jazz drummer

== See also ==
- Singleton (disambiguation)
