= David Newell (disambiguation) =

David Newell (born 1938) is an American television actor.

David Newell may also refer to:

- David McCheyne Newell (1898–1986), American journalist, novelist, and children's writer
- David Newell (actor, born 1905) (1905–1980), American character actor and make-up artist
- David Newell (judge) (born 1971), American judge on the Texas Court of Criminal Appeals
