= Danny Trevathan =

American football player (born 1990)

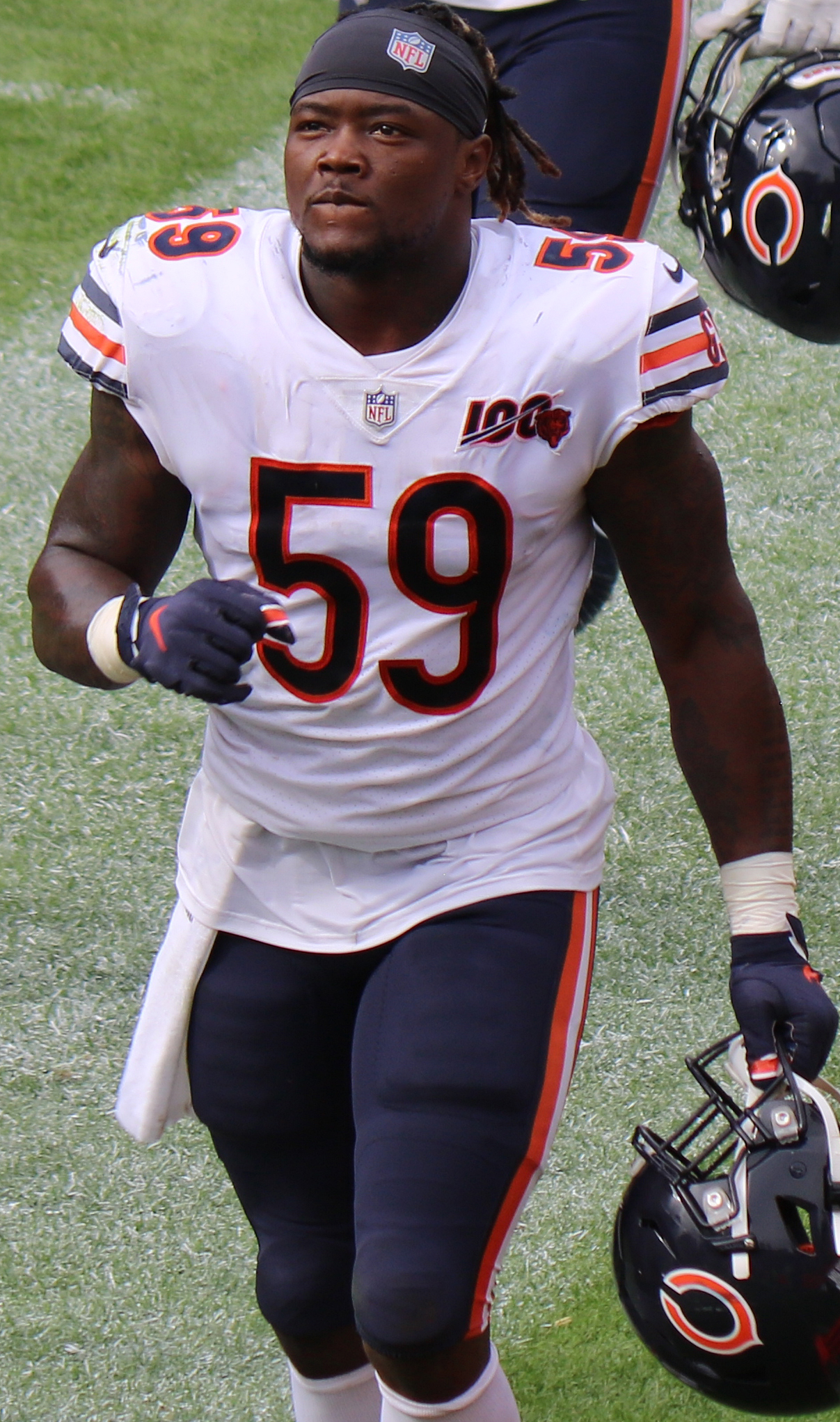
- Trevathan with the Chicago Bears in 2019

No. 59, 6
- Position: Linebacker

Personal information
- Born: March 24, 1990 (age 36); Youngstown, Ohio, U.S.
- Listed height: 6 ft 0 in (1.83 m)
- Listed weight: 237 lb (108 kg)

Career information
- High school: Leesburg (Leesburg, Florida)
- College: Kentucky (2008–2011)
- NFL draft: 2012: 6th round, 188th overall pick

Career history
- Denver Broncos (2012–2015); Chicago Bears (2016–2021)

Awards and highlights
- Super Bowl champion (50); 2× First-team All-SEC (2010, 2011)

Career NFL statistics
- Total tackles: 741
- Sacks: 10
- Forced fumbles: 7
- Fumble recoveries: 3
- Pass deflections: 39
- Interceptions: 8
- Defensive touchdowns: 1
- Stats at Pro Football Reference

Danny Eugene Trevathan (born March 24, 1990) is an American former professional football player who was a linebacker in the National Football League (NFL). He was selected by the Denver Broncos in the sixth round of the 2012 NFL draft. He played college football for the Kentucky Wildcats, where in 2010, he was named an All-American by College Football News and was a first-team all-SEC selection.

== College career ==
Trevathan attended and played college football at the University of Kentucky under head coaches Rich Brooks and Joker Phillips. In 2010, Trevathan led the Southeastern Conference in tackles with 144 on his way to being named a first-team all-conference by a number of national organizations, including the SEC coaches themselves. Following the 2010 season, Trevathan completed the 2011 NFL draft evaluation process but chose to return to Kentucky for his final season. In 2011, despite leading the SEC again in tackles through 9 games, he was not named a semifinalist for the Butkus Award, the top honor for college football linebackers.

== Professional career ==
External videos
- Danny Trevathan's NFL Combine workout

Pre-draft measurables
Height	Weight	Arm length	Hand span	40-yard dash	10-yard split	20-yard split	20-yard shuttle	Vertical jump	Broad jump	Bench press
6 ft 0 1/4 in (1.84 m)	237 lb (108 kg)	32 1/2 in (0.83 m)	9 1/2 in (0.24 m)	4.84 s	1.65 s	2.79 s	4.70 s	31 1/2 in (0.80 m)	9 ft 3 in (2.82 m)	18 reps
All values are from NFL Combine

=== Denver Broncos ===
==== 2012 ====
The Denver Broncos selected Trevathan in the sixth round (188th overall) of the 2012 NFL draft. He was the 25th linebacker selected in 2012.

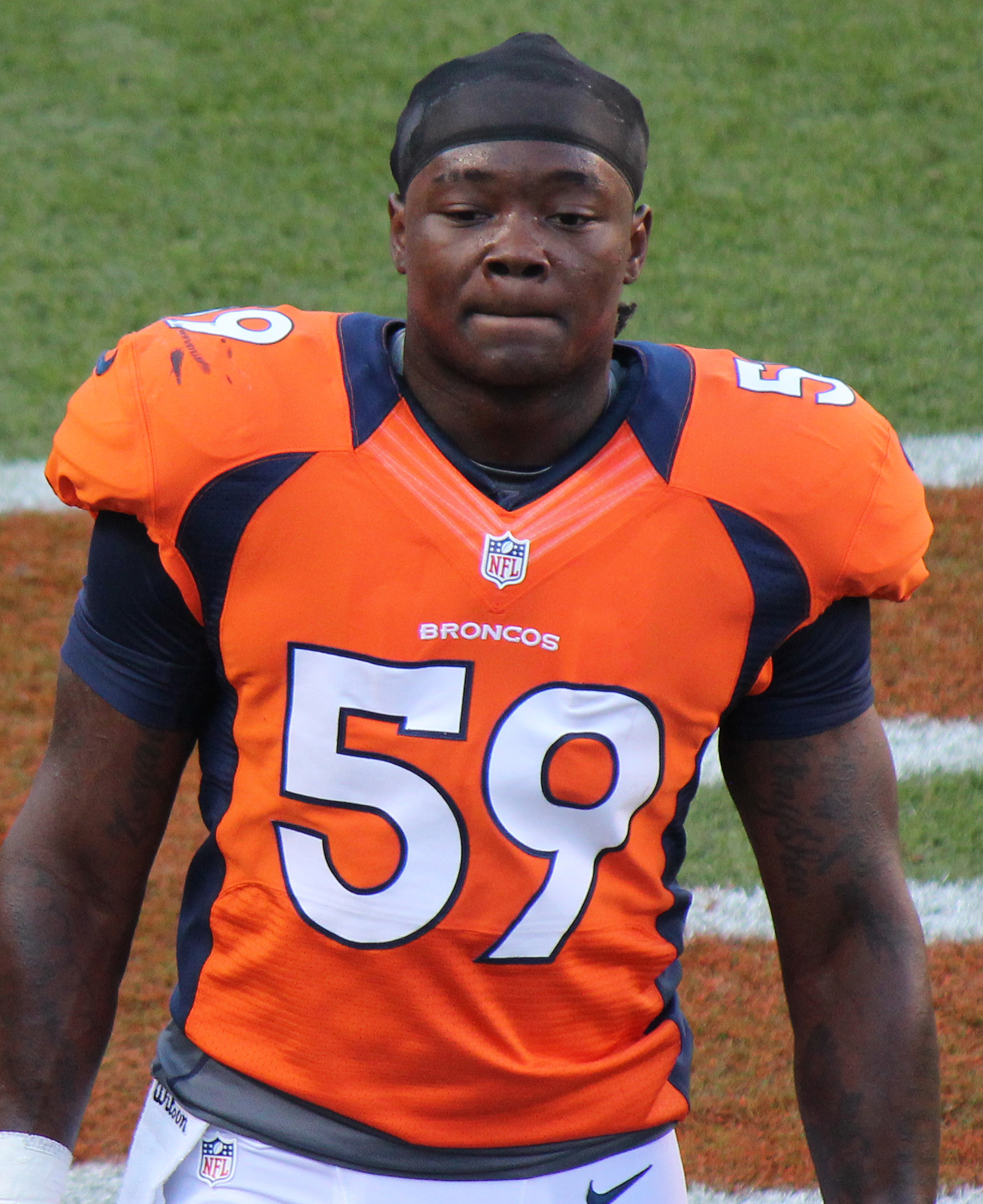
Trevathan with the Broncos in 2012

On May 22, 2012, the Broncos signed Trevathan to a four-year, $2.2 million contract.

Throughout training camp, he competed for a job as an outside linebacker against Wesley Woodyard, Nate Irving, Mike Mohamed, Cyril Obiozor, Steven Johnson, and D. J. Williams. Head coach John Fox named Trevathan a backup weakside linebacker behind Wesley Woodyard and newly acquired veteran free agent Keith Brooking.

He made his professional regular season debut in the Denver Broncos' season-opening 31–19 victory against the Pittsburgh Steelers. The following week, he made his first career tackle on running back Mike Goodson in the fourth quarter of the Broncos' 37–6 win against the Oakland Raiders. On November 4, 2012, Trevathan recorded a season-high six combined tackles and made his first career sack on quarterback Andy Dalton during a 31–23 victory. Trevathan finished his rookie season in 2012 with 33 combined tackles (22 solo), three pass deflections, and a sack in 16 games and no starts.

The Denver Broncos finished atop the AFC West with a 13–4 record and secured a playoff berth and first round bye. On January 12, 2013, Trevathan played in his first career playoff game and made one tackle during their 38–35 loss to the Baltimore Ravens in the AFC Divisional Round.

==== 2013 ====
Entering training camp, Trevathan was the favorite to earn the starting weakside linebacker role after Wesley Woodyard was moved to middle linebacker. Trevathan saw mild competition from Nate Irving, Steven Johnson, and Stewart Bradley. Defensive coordinator Jack Del Rio named him the starting weakside linebacker, opposite Von Miller, to begin the regular season.

He made his first career start in the Denver Broncos' season-opener against the Baltimore Ravens and recorded four solo tackles, two pass deflections, and made his first career interception off a pass by quarterback Joe Flacco in their 49–27 victory. In Week 5, Trevathan made five combined tackles, broke up a pass, and intercepted a pass by Tony Romo late in the fourth quarter to lead to the game-winning field goal during the Broncos' 51–48 victory at the Dallas Cowboys. On November 24, 2013, he collected a season-high 13 combined tackles during a 34–31 loss at the New England Patriots. He finished the 2013 season with a career-high 128 combined tackles (88 solo), a career-high ten pass deflections, three interception, and two sacks in 16 games and 16 starts.

He started his first career playoff game and recorded four combined tackles in their 24–17 win against the San Diego Chargers in the AFC Divisional Round. On February 2, 2014, Trevathan led the Broncos with 12 combined tackles (seven solo) as they lost 43–8 to the Seattle Seahawks in Super Bowl XLVIII.

==== 2014 ====
On August 12, 2014, the Denver Broncos announced that Trevathan had sustained a fracture below his left knee during practice after center Will Montgomery accidentally rolled on to his leg and was expected to miss the first 6–8 weeks of the regular season. The Denver Broncos had Brandon Marshall start in place of Trevathan while he recuperated from his injury. He returned in Week 5 and recorded a season-high seven combined tackles during a 41–20 victory against the Arizona Cardinals. On October 13, 2014, it was reported that the Broncos' had placed Trevathan on their injured reserve with designation to return after he aggravated his fracture under his left knee. Trevathan made his return during the Broncos' 22–20 Week 15 victory at the San Diego Chargers and recorded four combined tackles. He left in the fourth quarter after sustaining an injury. On December 15, 2014, it was announced that Trevathan would miss the remainder of the season after it was discovered he dislocated his patellar tendon and would require surgery to repair it. He finished the 2014 season with 11 combined tackles (nine solo) in three games and one start.

==== 2015 ====
On January 12, 2015, the Denver Broncos and head coach John Fox agreed to mutually part. Trevathan was moved to inside linebacker after defensive coordinator Wade Phillips opted to convert to a base 3-4 defense. Head coach Gary Kubiak named him the starting inside linebacker to begin the regular season, along with Brandon Marshall and outside linebackers Von Miller and DeMarcus Ware.

In Week 9, he collected a career-high 19 combined tackles (13 solo) and deflected a pass during a 27–24 loss at the Indianapolis Colts. On December 6, 2015, Trevathan recorded two solo tackles, broke up a pass, and returned an interception by Philip Rivers for a 25-yard touchdown during the Broncos' 17–3 victory at the San Diego Chargers in Week 13. The interception returned for a touchdown marked the first score of his career. Trevathan left in the second half after suffering a concussion and was unable to play the following game (Week 14). He finished the 2015 season leading the Broncos with 109 combined tackles (73 solo), six pass deflections, two interceptions, and a touchdown in 15 games and 15 starts.

The Denver Broncos finished the 2015 season first in the AFC West with a record of 12-4, clinching a first round bye and home field advantage during the process. The Broncos went on to the Super Bowl after defeating the Pittsburgh Steelers in the AFC Divisional Round and the New England Patriots in the AFC Championship. On February 7, 2016, Trevathan started in Super Bowl 50 and led the Broncos with eight combined tackles and recovered two fumbles to help the Denver Broncos defeat the Carolina Panthers 24–10.

Trevathan entered free agency as the top inside linebacker available and received major interest from the Tennessee Titans, Atlanta Falcons, and Chicago Bears.

=== Chicago Bears ===
==== 2016 ====
On March 9, 2016, the Chicago Bears signed Trevathan to a four-year, $28 million contract that includes $12 million guaranteed and a $5 million signing bonus. His signing with the Bears reunited him with his head coach John Fox, and who coached Trevathan during the first three years of his career. Defensive coordinator Vic Fangio named Trevathan the starting inside linebacker, opposite Jerrell Freeman and outside linebackers Willie Young and Pernell McPhee.

He started the Chicago Bears' season-opener at the Houston Texans and recorded 11 combined tackles (seven solo) and a sack on Brock Osweiler during their 23–14 victory. He sustained a calf injury in Week 2 and missed the next two games (Weeks 3–4) while recovering. On November 13, 2016, Trevathan recorded a season-high 13 combined tackles (nine solo) during a 36–10 loss to the Tampa Bay Buccaneers. On November 28, 2016, the Chicago Bears placed Trevathan on injured reserve for the rest of the season after he suffered a ruptured patellar tendon in Week 12. He finished the season with 66 combined tackles (49 solo), four pass deflections, and a sack in nine games and eight starts.

==== 2017 ====
On September 28, 2017, Trevathan recorded a season-high 13 combined tackles (six solo) during a 35–14 loss to the Green Bay Packers. He was involved in a controversial play when he delivered a helmet-to-helmet hit with the crown of his helmet to Packers' wide receiver Davante Adams and was flagged for unnecessary roughness. The hit was violent and showed Adams mouthpiece being knocked out and him losing consciousness. Many analysts deemed the hit unnecessary due to safety Adrian Amos having Adams wrapped up immediately after he caught a screen pass. On September 30, 2017, he was suspended two games for the hit, but later had it decreased to one game after he attended an appeal heard by former Tampa Bay Buccaneers' linebacker Derrick Brooks. On October 22, 2017, Trevathan recorded four combined tackles, two pass deflections, a sack, and intercepted a pass by Cam Newton during a 17–3 victory against the Carolina Panthers. The following week, he collected a season-high tying 13 combined tackles (nine solo) in their 20–12 loss at the New Orleans Saints. He served his suspension during the Bears' Week 10 loss to the Green Bay Packers and was inactive for the next two games (Weeks 11–13) due to a calf injury. Trevathan finished the 2017 season with 89 combined tackles (60 solo), five pass deflections, two sacks, and an interception in 12 games and 12 starts.

==== 2018 ====
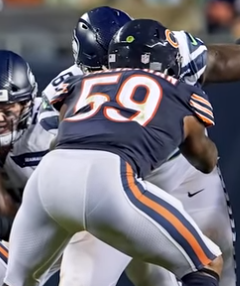
Trevathan in a game against the Seattle Seahawks in 2018

In Week 2 of the 2018 NFL season, Trevathan recorded six solo tackles, two assists, two sacks, and a forced fumble in a 24–17 Monday Night Football win over the Seattle Seahawks, earning him NFC Defensive Player of the Week. In Week 7 against the New England Patriots, Trevathan had 10 tackles. In Week 16 against the San Francisco 49ers, Trevathan made seven tackles and intercepted a pass from Nick Mullens deflected off wide receiver Marquise Goodwin. The Bears would win 14–9.

Trevathan finished the season with 102 total tackles (76 solo), two sacks, two interceptions, one forced fumble, and one fumble recovery. He was selected as Pro Bowl alternate.

==== 2019 ====
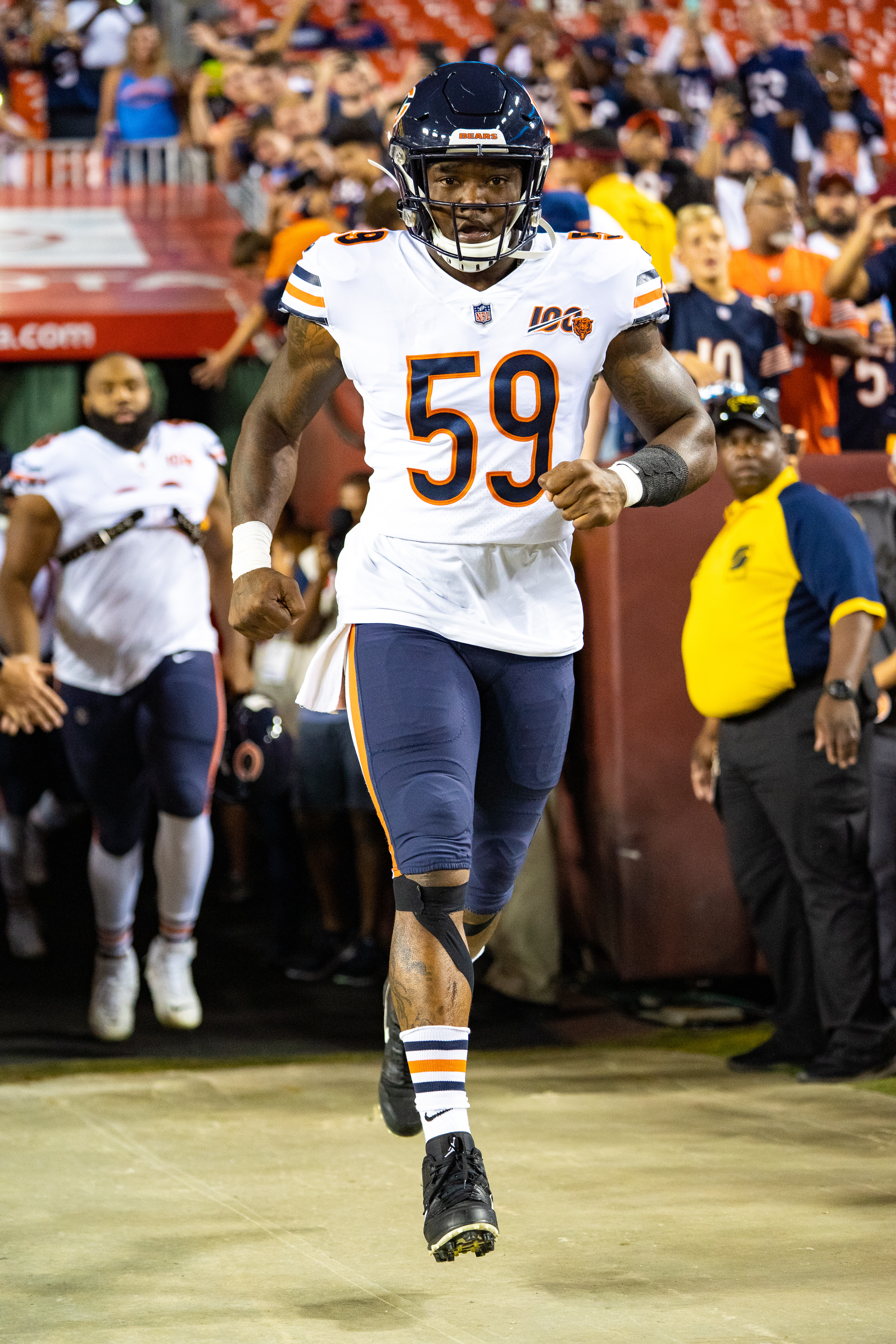
Trevathan in a game against the Washington Redskins

In Week 2, Trevathan made his return to Denver and recorded 12 tackles in the 16–14 win. The following week against the Washington Redskins, Trevathan sacked Case Keenum once and forced him to fumble on a quarterback sneak in the 31–15 win.

In Week 10 against the Detroit Lions, Trevathan suffered a gruesome arm injury while attempting to sack quarterback Jeff Driskel. He left the game and did not return. On December 18, he was placed on injured reserve. He finished the 2019 season with one sack, 70 total tackles (50 solo), one pass defensed, and one forced fumble in nine games and starts.

==== 2020 ====
On March 16, 2020, Trevathan signed a three-year contract extension with the Bears.

In Week 16 against the Jacksonville Jaguars, Trevathan recorded his first sack of the season on former teammate Mike Glennon during the 41–17 win. In the 2020 season, Trevathan recorded one sack, 113 total tackles (67 solo), five passes defended, and one forced fumble in 16 games and starts.

==== 2021 ====
On September 1, 2021, Trevathan was placed on injured reserve. He also decided to change his number from 59 to 6. He was activated on October 9. On November 19, 2021, Trevathan was placed back on injured reserve, ending his season. He appeared in five games and started one in the 2021 season.

The Bears released Trevathan on March 16, 2022.

== NFL career statistics ==
Legend
	Won the Super Bowl
**Bold**	Career high

Year	Team	Games		Tackles				Interceptions				Fumbles	
Year	Team	GP	GS	Cmb	Solo	Ast	Sck	Int	Yds	TD	PD	FF	FR
2012	DEN	**16**	0	33	22	11	1.0	0	0	0	2	0	0
2013	DEN	**16**	**16**	**129**	**88**	41	**2.0**	**3**	29	0	**10**	**3**	**1**
2014	DEN	3	1	11	9	2	0.0	0	0	0	0	0	0
2015	DEN	15	15	109	73	36	0.0	2	**39**	**1**	6	0	0
2016	CHI	9	8	66	49	17	1.0	0	0	0	4	0	0
2017	CHI	12	12	89	60	29	**2.0**	1	8	0	5	1	**1**
2018	CHI	**16**	**16**	102	76	26	**2.0**	2	12	0	6	1	**1**
2019	CHI	9	9	70	50	20	1.0	0	0	0	1	1	0
2020	CHI	**16**	**16**	113	67	**46**	1.0	0	0	0	5	1	0
2021	CHI	5	1	19	8	11	0.0	0	0	0	0	0	0
Career		117	94	741	502	239	10.0	8	88	1	39	7	3

== Personal life ==
Trevathan was born in Youngstown, Ohio. His father played college football at the University of Toledo and was also a linebacker. Danny attended Leesburg High School in Leesburg, Florida.
