= Cooke Field =

Stadium in Leesburg, Florida

- Interactive map of Cooke Field
- Location: Leesburg, Florida
- Coordinates: 28°48′43″N 81°51′58″W
- Owner: City of Leesburg
- Surface: Grass

Construction
- Demolished: early 1950s

Tenants
- Philadelphia Phillies (NL) (1922-1924); Leesburg Spiders (Negro leagues) (1925-1930); Leesburg High School (1926-1950)

Cooke Field was a stadium located in Leesburg, Florida, used primarily for baseball and football. The stadium was named after R.F.E. Cooke, a local banker, and had been the site of local baseball games.

== Baseball ==
In 1922, the stadium was refurbished and the Philadelphia Phillies held their spring training there from 1922 until 1924. According to news reports at the time, the refurbishment called for the field to be "cleared, leveled, clayed and sodded, a grandstand and a board fence built, all in less than three months." Reports also state that the city even had to cut down trees southwest of center field and fill in a big hollow in another corner.

The Phillies played the first regulation game on the field on March 11, 1922.

On March 14, 1923, Rogers Hornsby and the St. Louis Cardinals played an exhibition game against the Phillies at Cooke Field.

That same March, sharpshooter Annie Oakley, who had a residence in Leesburg, performed a shooting exhibition for the practicing Phillies' players. Phillies' manager Art Fletcher stated in 1924 that "As long as I am manager of the team, I shall do all I can to come back to Leesburg for spring training." However, the Phillies did not return to the city in 1925. After the Phillies left for McKechnie Field, located in Bradenton, Cooke Field fell into disrepair. Many local players referred to the stadium as "Sand Spur Field", due to the high amount of sand spurs present in grass.

The Leesburg Spiders, part of the Negro baseball leagues used the field from 1925 to 1930.

== Football ==
When Leesburg High School started their football program in 1926, the team used the field for football practices and games. However the local Chamber of Commerce, along with several civic club members and people from the community promoted a drive to build the school a stadium. In 1951 Leesburg High School's football began play at Memorial Field was dedicated to war veterans and victims of World War II.

== Demolition ==
In 1936, the city built the Ballpark at Venetian Gardens, which became Leesburg's premier ballpark. The new ballpark had concrete stands, while Cooke Field still had wooden bleachers. In the early 1950s the stadium was demolished. The site of Cooke Field is currently occupied by the Cutrale Citrus plant.
