= Dorset button =

Type of button

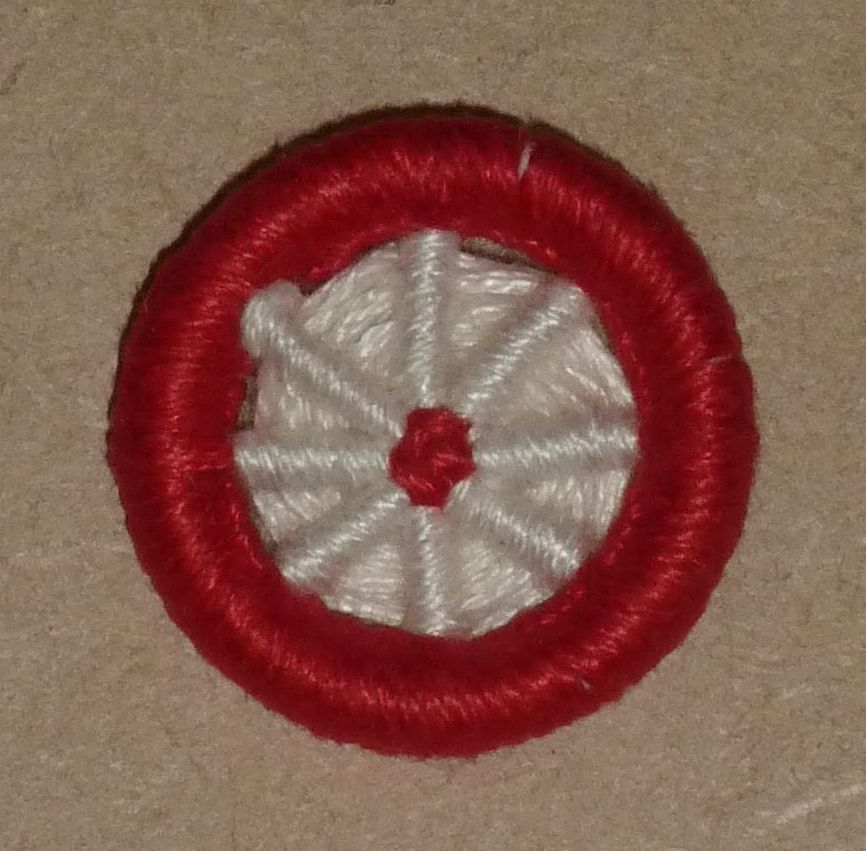
'Blandford Cartwheel' button

A Dorset button is a style of craft-made button originating in the English county of Dorset. Their manufacture was at a peak between 1622 and 1850, after which they were overtaken by machine-made buttons from factories in the developing industries of Birmingham and other growing cities.

== Types ==
Dorset buttons are characteristically made by repeatedly binding yarn over a disc or ring former. There are four main forms and a large number of individual styles within these.

=== Wheels ===
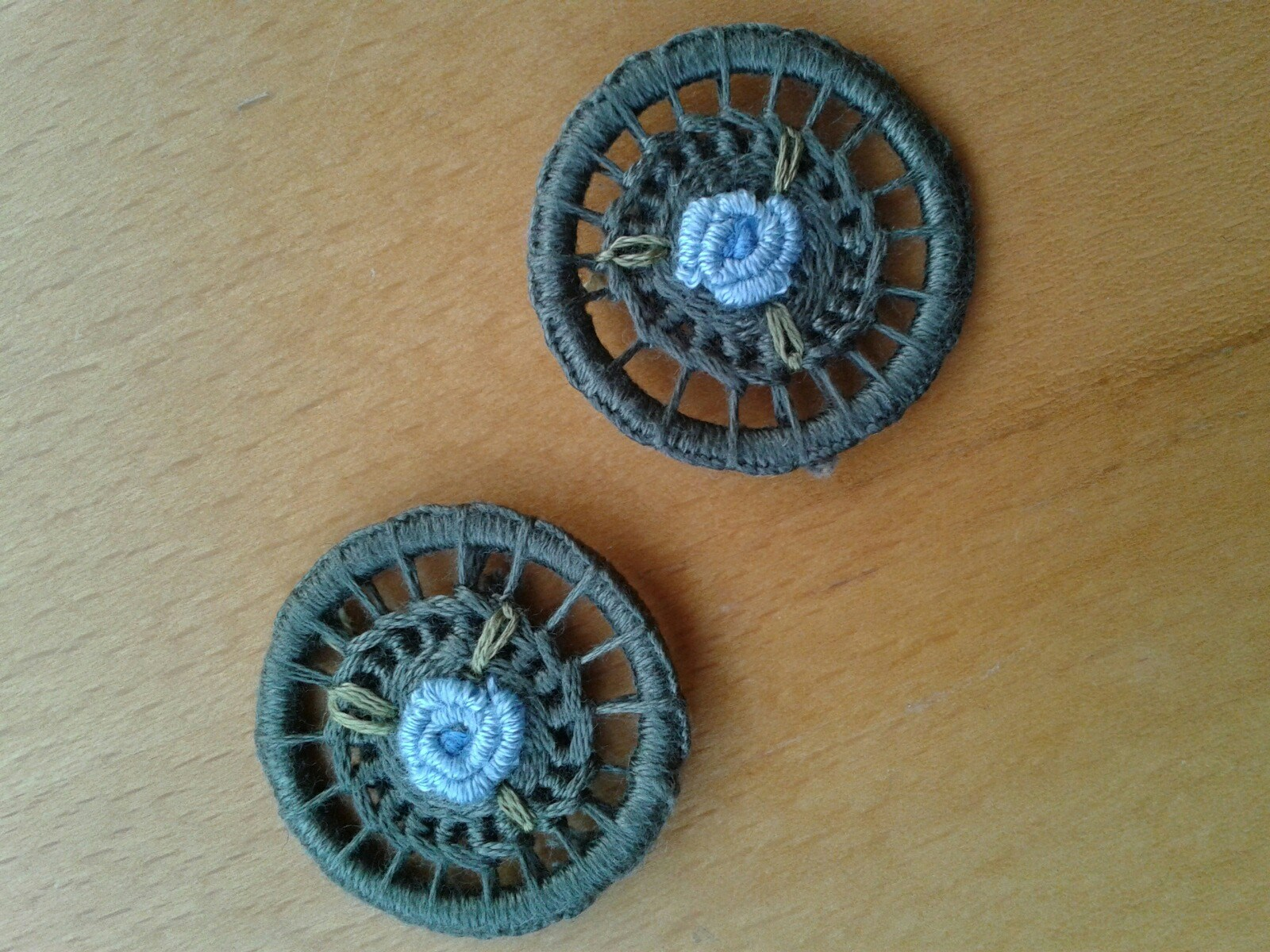
Pair of crosswheel buttons

'Wheels' are the most characteristic form of Dorset button and worked on a ring. They are also known as Dorset Cartwheel, Crosswheels, Basket weave and Yarrells.

Wheels are made by variations on the same processes of Casting, Slicking, Laying and Rounding:

Casting
Blanket stitch is worked around a ring former, encasing it in a toroidal sleeve of yarn.
Slicking
The initial stitches were worked from the outside of the ring. They originally protruded outside the ring, and are now turned on the ring to all be on the inside. This leaves the outer edge smooth, giving a more functional button, and also forms a slightly protruding flange of stitchwork on the inside.
Laying
Crosswise strands are stitched radially across the button, from side to side of the casting stitches. Stitches are either caught through the casting stitches, now on the inside after slicking, or else they are simply wrapped over the outside of the ring. These passes may form either a radial star or, if they pass to the sides of the centre, a hollow star. The number of strands varies for the pattern. Strands are usually arranged symmetrically around the ring, but they may be skipped or gathered into bunches, to give patterns.
'Birds eye' buttons do not have any laying or rounding, but use multiple passes of thickened casting to make a simple 'doughnut' button. Originally, before the introduction of wire rings, these were a single pass, formed over a rolled piece of cloth.
Rounding
Rounding weaves a spiral of yarn over the crosswise laid strands, starting from the centre. This step gives most of the pattern variation for a wheel button. 'Blandford Cartwheels' may stop after only a few turns of rounding. 'Crosswheels' have very little rounding and their cross strands are prominent. 'Basket weave' uses an extensive rounding, visible on the top surface and hiding the cross strands.

=== High tops and Dorset knobs ===
'High Tops' and 'Dorset Knobs' are patterns that are taller, or nearly as tall, as they are wide. They were the first Dorset buttons to be made, being made on a ram's horn base, before the advent of the metal ring former. They are covered in fabric, then embroidered for decoration. Techniques for making them were lost, but rediscovered in the 1970s. The Dorset knob also gave its name to a locally produced hard biscuit.

=== Birdseyes and mites ===
These were made by using a small piece of triangular fabric and rolled and formed into a doughnut shape with a hole in the centre. This form was then covered with blanket stitches

=== Singletons ===
'Singletons' are made on a similar ring former to wheels, but this is padded with a disc of woven fabric that is then embroidered. Their name derives from the Singleton family, who made a speciality of this style in the 17th century.

== History ==
Buttons only began to be made in England in the 1400s, when the transition began to be made from ties to this new form of closure. Buttons were traded between towns by itinerant peddlers. but there was no organised trade or centres of production beyond this. Around 1600, men's upper-body clothing was beginning its transition from the doublet to the coat. Buttons became larger, more prominent and became a specialist item made by button-makers, rather than tailors.

The first Dorset buttons used products of the local sheep farms: ram's horn as a base and locally produced cloth over this. These were the High Top buttons. The doublet or peascod was fastened by a single central row of small, closely spaced buttons. These were made tall, to avoid the small buttons slipping out of the stiff fabric. As the button line of fashion moved outwards and the garment became more flexible, a wider and lower button was needed, the Dorset Knob.

Linen yarns and fabric were used for quality and commercial work, although some early buttons for local use used cheaper woollen yarns from local herds. Most buttons were produced in their natural colour, but could be dyed to match garments. The use of multiple yarn colours is a predominantly modern trend. Dorset buttons were known and traded widely, but it was a long time before their production was organised into a recognisable industry.

=== The Case family ===
In 1622 Abraham Case moved to Shaftesbury and set up the first commercial button-making enterprise. Originally from Gloucestershire, he had been a soldier in Europe during the Thirty Years War but returned and married a girl from Wardour before settling in Shaftesbury. Having seen the direction of European fashions he believed that 'Buttony' would become a thriving industry.

His first buttons were made in a small workshop. Later buttons for the growing trade were made by outworkers working from their homes as piece work. Some farm workers worked on the land during daylight hours, and on button-making in the evenings or in winter. Most though were full-time button-makers. This outwork became the norm and an important source of income for many families, and for those too old to work in the fields.

Buttons were graded by quality. The finest export grade were mounted onto pink cards. Domestic quality were set on dark-blue cards and the lowest quality onto yellow cards. A good buttoner could make around six dozen (72) buttons a day and could earn up to three shillings. Buttons sold at retail for between eight pence and three shillings a dozen. This compared to wages of perhaps 9d a day as a farm worker. It also had the advantage of being a home-based activity, which was more attractive than being outside in all weathers and also reduced expenditure on shoes and the wear and laundering of clothes.

By the end of the 17th century, Buttony had grown to become an important industry, controlled within the Case family. A great many pedlars and hawkers were registered in Shaftesbury, far more than in any other local towns. An Act of Parliament was passed in 1699 that, amongst its export restrictions on woollens, prevented the making of buttons “made of cloth, serge, drugget, or other stuffs”. The Act would remain in force for two hundred years, but in practice appears to have had little lasting effect on trade.

Abraham's sons Abraham Jr. and Elias continued with the business, Elias opening a second depot at Bere Regis. By 1720 there were agencies at Milborne St Andrew, Sherborne, Poole, Langton Matravers and Tarrant Keyneston.

Around this time, new forms of button were developed. Wire was imported by wagon from the Midlands, then twisted into rings and soldered. These ring formers replaced the previous horn discs and began the characteristic Dorset styles of the wheel buttons. Ring making was carried out by children working as 'Twisters', who formed the rings; 'Dippers', who soldered them shut; and 'Stringers', who tied them into strings for distribution to the button makers.

After a fire in 1731 destroyed the Bere depot, Elias Case, Abraham's son, employed as a manager a Yorkshire businessman, John Clayton, who reorganised the firm. A London sales office was opened by Clayton in 1743, followed in 1744 by a new major depot at Lytchett Minster. Abraham's grandson Peter Case opened an export office in Liverpool. Case family money founded the well-known Cases Street and Clayton Square in Liverpool. Peter Case also developed a new rust-free alloy for making the wire rings.

Smaller collection offices across the county were established at Milborne Stileham, Sixpenny Handley, Piddletrenthide, Langton and Wool. At one time 'Buttony' employed 4,000 people with a turnover of £14,000.

=== Decline ===
The hand-made Dorset button was slowly replaced by machine-made buttons. The first cloth-and-thread button machine was invented by Benjamin Saunders in 1825. The Saunders machine was closely followed by others including one by John Aston in the early 1840s.

Amongst the many industrial machines on display at the 1851 Great Exhibition was John Ashton's button-making press, first patented in 1841. This could manufacture buttons from thin metal sheet far more quickly and cheaply than hand work. These new buttons had the advantage of smart modernity. Birmingham would soon become a major centre for this type of costume jewellery and small presswork. The centralised factories, steam power and access to venture capital could not be competed with by the small-scale enterprises of rural Dorset.

Although the agrarian economy of Dorset remained profitable, the collapse of button-making led to much personal hardship. Many joined the mass emigrations to Australia, Canada or the USA. Some became destitute and entered the workhouse.

The last surviving descendant of Abraham Case died at Milborne St Andrew in 1908. In the Edwardian period, renewed interest in traditional crafts led Florence, Dowager Lady Lees to attempt to revive the industry but this was frustrated by the outbreak of the Great War. It was also attempted by the newly formed Women's Institute after the war, but to no avail.

In 2017, the Heritage Crafts Association included button making as one of their list of endangered heritage crafts.

== In popular culture ==
Dorset buttons have given their name to the Dorset Buttons ladies' Morris side. The side was formed in 1978 at Wareham in Dorset. Although a Dorset side, they dance in the North West tradition, wearing wooden-soled clogs. Their colours are red and green with straw hats covered in Dorset buttons.

In the book Burning Bright (2007) by Tracy Chevalier one of the protagonists, Anne Kellaway from Piddletrenthide, makes (and describes the process of making) Dorset buttons.
