= Abe Anellis =

Russian-American food microbiologist

- Born: Avraam "Abrosha" Anelis; February 15, 1914; Mogilev, Russian Empire
- Died: August 28, 2001; Leesburg, Florida, U.S.
- Education: University of Illinois at Urbana-Champaign
- Known for: Research on food irradiation and microbiological safety
- Scientific career
- Fields: Food microbiology
- Institutions: U.S. Army Quartermaster Corps, Natick Research and Development Laboratories

Abe Anellis (1914–2001), was a food microbiologist.

== Early life ==
Anellis was born Avraam "Abrosha" Anelis in previously Mogilëv, Russian Empire on 15 February 1914.

Anellis's father emigrated from Russia and established himself in the United States, settling in Chicago, Illinois. Anellis and his mother remained in Russia to endure on their own the vicissitudes of World War I, the Russian Revolution, and civil war. At one point, Anellis became separated from his mother and spent several years in a Bolshevik-run orphanage until his mother was able to locate him. In 1923 they emigrated to Chicago.

== Career ==
Anellis attended Crane Technical College in Chicago and the University of Illinois at Urbana-Champaign, earning his tuition and living expenses working in a spice factory and as an usher at the Chicago Civic Opera. He received his M.S. degree from the University of Illinois in 1940. At the beginning of 1940, while still working on his doctorate, he was hired by the Illinois Department of Health, in Carbondale, working as a clinical bacteriologist beginning in 1940 and in July 1941 he joined the Northern Regional Research Laboratory of the Bureau of Agriculture and Industrial Chemistry in the Agriculture and Research Administration of the U.S. Department of Agriculture, in Peoria, Illinois, working on the use of microbiologically produced fermentation of farm by-products for production of grain alcohol, including ethanol.

In February 1944 Anellis joined the newly created U.S. Army Quartermaster Corps Food and Container Institute in Chicago, and worked on problems of the microbiological safety of foods being shipped overseas to U.S. servicemen. Dehydrated milk and dehydrated eggs were products developed at this time for which Anellis tested the microbiological safety. Anellis's research focused on strains of bacteria which were especially heat-resistant, including salmonella and clostridium botulinum. This led to the consideration of the use of gamma radiation as a food preservative, and Anellis began research on the radiation resistance of bacteria in canned foods. In 1963 the Food and Container Institute was closed and its operations were moved to the U.S. Army Natick Research and Development Laboratories in Natick, Massachusetts. Anellis continued his research on the radiation resistance of bacteria at the Natick Labs until his retirement in 1977. While working at the Natick Labs he also participated in the program to develop foods and food preservations for NASA. Anellis was an advocate of irradiation of foods as a food preservative and preventative against microbiological contamination, and testified before the U.S. Congress and the U.S. Food and Drug Administration on the safety of human consumption of foods irradiated at low dosage.

Upon retirement, Anellis moved to Leesburg, Florida and spent part of his leisure as a volunteer at the Lake Regional Medical Center, after turning down an opportunity to teach microbiology at Lake-Sumter Community College. During the first few years of retirement, he returned to Massachusetts in the summers to supervise the research projects that he had already begun. He died on 28 August 2001 in Leesburg, Florida.

More detail is available in "Abe Anellis & the Microbiology of Irradiated Food".

== Publications ==
- J. M. Van Lanen, E. H. Le Mense, Abe Anellis, & Julian Corman. 1948. "Influence of Proteolyptic Enzymes and Yeast Nutrients upon the Requirement for Malt in Grain Alcohol Fermentations", Cereal Chemistry 25, 326–336.
- Abe Anellis, J. Lubas, & Morton M. Rayman. 1954. "Heat Resistance in Liquid Eggs of Some Strains of the Genus Salmonella", Food Research 19, 377–395.
- Abe Anellis, C. J. Chicon, & Morton M. Rayman. 1960. "Resistance of Bacillus Coagulans Spores to Gamma Rays. Application of the Multiple Tube Probability Method", Food Research 25, 285–295.
- Abe Anellis. 1961. "Radioresistance of a Pseudomonas Species Isolated from the Omega West Reactor", Radiation Research 15, 720–723.
- Abe Anellis & Robert B. Koch. 1962. "Comparative Resistance of Strains of Clostridium botulinum to Gamma Rays", Applied Microbiology 10, 326–330.
- Nicholas Grecz, Abe Anellis, & Morris D. Schneider. 1962. "Procedure for Cleaning Clostridium botulinum Spores", Journal of Bacteriology 84, 552–558.
- Morris D. Schneider, Nicholas Grecz, & Abe Anellis. 1962. "Concentrated Culture of Clostridium botulinum Spores in Dialysis Sacks", Q[uarter]M[aster] Corps Project No. 7-84-01-002 Progress Report No. 3 (1962).
- Morris D. Schneider, Nicholas Grecz, & Abe Anellis. 1963. "Sporulation of Clostridium botulinum Types A, B and E, Clostridium Perfringens, and putrefactive Anaerobe 3679 in dialysis sacs", Journal of Bacteriology 85, 126–133.
- Abe Anellis, Nicholas Grecz, Dorothy Ann Huber, Daniel Berkowitz, Morris D. Schneider, & Morris Simon. 1965. "Radiation Sterilization of Bacon for Military Feeding", Applied Microbiology 13, 37–42.
- Abe Anellis, Nicholas Grecz, & Daniel Berkowitz. 1965. "Survival of Clostridium botulinum Spores", Applied Microbiology 13, 397–401.
- Nicholas Grecz, Otto Peter Snyder, A. A. Walker, & Abe Anellis. 1965. "Effect of Temperature of Liquid Nitrogen on Radiation Resistance of Spores of Clostridium botulinum", Applied Microbiology 13, 527–536.
- R. A. Greenberg, R. B. Tompkin, B. O. Bladel, R. S. Kittaka, & Abe Anelis. 1966. "Incidence of Mesophilic Clostridium Spores in Raw Pork, Beef, and Chicken in Processing Plants in the United States and Canada", Applied Microbiology 14, 789–793.
- Abe Anellis, Daniel Berkowitz, Carol Jarboe, & Hamed M. El-Bisi. 1967. "Radiation Sterilization of Prototype Military Foods. II. Cured Ham", Applied Microbiology 15, 166–177.
- Abe Anellis & Stanley Werkowski. 1968. "Estimation of Radiation Resistance Values of Microorganisms in Food Products", Applied Microbiology 16, 1300–1308.
- Abe Anellis, Daniel Berkowitz, Carol Jarboe, & Hamed M. El-Bisi. 1969. "Radiation Sterilization of Prototype Military Foods. III. Pork Loin", Applied Microbiology 18, 604–611.
- Abe Anellis & Durwood B. Rowley. 1970. "Production of C. botulinum Spores Types A and B", in Mendel Herzberg (ed.), Proceedings of the First U.S.-Japan Conference on Toxic Microorganisms, U.S. Department of Interior and UJNR Panels on Toxic Microorganisms (Washington, D.C.: U.S. Government Printing Office), 317–324.
- Durwood B. Rowley, Hamed M. El-Bisi, Abe Anellis, & Otto Peter Snyder, Jr. 1970. "Resistance of Clostridium botulinum Spores to Ionizing Radiation as Related to Radappertization of Foods", in Mendel Herzberg (ed.), Proceedings of the First U.S.-Japan Conference on Toxic Microorganisms, U.S. Department of Interior and UJNR Panels on Toxic Microorganisms (Washington, D.C.: U.S. Government Printing Office).
- Nicholas Grecz, A. A. Walker, Abe Anellis, & Daniel Berkowitz. 1971. "Effect of Irradiation Temperature in the Range –196 to 95 C on the Resistance of Spores of Clostridium botulinum 33A in Cooked Beef", Canadian Journal of Microbiology 17 (no. 2), 135–142.
- Abe Anellis & Stanley Werkowski. 1971. "Estimation of an Equivalent “12D” Process by the Normal Distribution Method", Canadian Journal of Microbiology 17 (no. 9), 1185–1187.
- Walter J. Clifford & Abe Anellis, A. 1971. "Clostridium perfringens. I. Sporulation in a Biphasic Glucose-Ion Exchange Resin Medium", Applied Microbiology 22 (no. 5), 856–861.
- Abe Anellis, Daniel Berkowitz, Dorothy Kemper, & Durwood B. Rowley. 1972. "Production of Types A and B Spores of Clostridium botulinum by the Biphasic Method: Effect on Spore Population, Radiation Resistance, and Toxigenicity", Applied Microbiology 23 (no. 4), 734–739.
- Abe Anellis, Daniel Berkowitz, W. Swantak, & C. Strojan. 1972. "Radiation Sterilization of Prototype Military Foods: Low-Temperature Irradiation of Codfish Cake, Corned Beef, and Pork Sausage", Applied Microbiology 24 (no. 3, September), 453–462.
- Abe Anellis, Daniel Berkowitz, & Dorothy Kemper. 1973. "Comparative Resistance of Nonsporogenic Bacteria to Low-Temperature Gamma Irradiation", Applied Microbiology 25 (no. 4, April), 517–523.
- Durwood B. Rowley, Abe Anellis, Stanley Wierbicki, & A. W. Baker. 1974. "Status of the Radappertization of Meats", Journal of Milk and Food Technology 37 (no. 2), 86–93.
- Walter J. Clifford, Abe Anellis, A., & Edward W. Ross, Jr. 1974. "Evaluation of Media, Time and Temperature of Incubation, and Method of Enumeration of Several Strains of Clostridium perfringens Spores", Applied Microbiology 27 (no. 4, April), 784–792.
- Walter J. Clifford & Abe Anellis. 1975. "Radiation Resistance of Some Clostridium perfringens Strains", Applied Microbiology 29 (no. 6, June), 861–863.
- Abe Anellis, Edward Shattuck, Durwood B. Rowley, Edward W. Ross, Jr., D. N. Whaley, & V. R. Dowell, Jr. 1975. "Low-Temperature Irradiation of Beef and Methods for Evaluation of a Radappertization Process", Applied Microbiology 30 (no. 5, November), 811–820.
- M. S. U. Chowdhury, Durwood B. Rowley, Abe Anellis, & Hillel S. Levinson. 1976. "Influence of Postirradiation Incubation Temperature on Recovery of Radiation-Injured Clostridium botulinum 62A Spores", Applied and Environmental Microbiology 32 (no. 1, July), 172–178.
- Abe Anellis, Durwood B. Rowley, & Edward W. Ross, Jr. 1976. "Microbiological Safety of Radappertized Beef", Proceedings of the 1st International Congress on Engineering and Food (Boston), August 9–13, 1976.
- Abe Anellis, Edward Shattuck, T. Latt, S. Songpasertchal, Durwood B. Rowley, & Edward W. Ross, Jr. 1976. "Gamma Irradiation at −30±10° of Low Nitrite/Nitrate Ham", in A. N. Baker, G. W. Gould, & J. Wolf (eds.), Spore Research (New York/London: Academic Press), 631–647.
- R. Burt Maxcy, Durwood B. Rowley, & Abe Anellis. 1976. "Radiation Resistance of Asporogenous Bacteria in Frozen Beef", Technical Report 76-43-FSL, U.S. Army Natick Research and Development Command, Natick, MA.
- Abe Anellis, Daniel Berkowitz, & Dorothy Kemper. 1977. "Comparative Radiation Death Kinetics of Clostridium botulinum Spores at Low-Temperature Gamma Irradiation", Journal of Food Protection 40 (no. 5, May), 313–316.
- Abe Anellis & Daniel Berkowitz. 1977. "Comparative Dose-Survival Curves of Representative Clostridium botulinum Type F Spores and Type A and B Spores", Applied and Environmental Microbiology 34 (no. 5, November), 600–601.
- Abe Anellis, Edward Shattuck, M. Morin, B. Srisara, S. Qvale, Durwood B. Rowley, & Edward W. Ross, Jr. 1977. "Cryogenic Gamma Irradiation of Prototype Pork and Chicken and Antagonistic Effect between Clostridium botulinum Types A and B", Applied and Environmental Microbiology 34 (no. 6, December), 823–831.
- R. Burt Maxcy, Durwood B. Rowley, & Abe Anellis. 1978. "Radiation and Heat Resistance of Moraxella-Acinetobacter in Meats", Technical Report 78/010, U.S. Army Natick Research and Development Command, Natick, MA.
- Abe Anellis, Durwood B. Rowley, & Edward W. Ross, Jr. 1979. "Microbiological Safety of Radappertized Beef", Journal of Food Protection 42 (no. 12, December), 927–932.
