= Dorset knob =

Savoury biscuit from Dorset, England

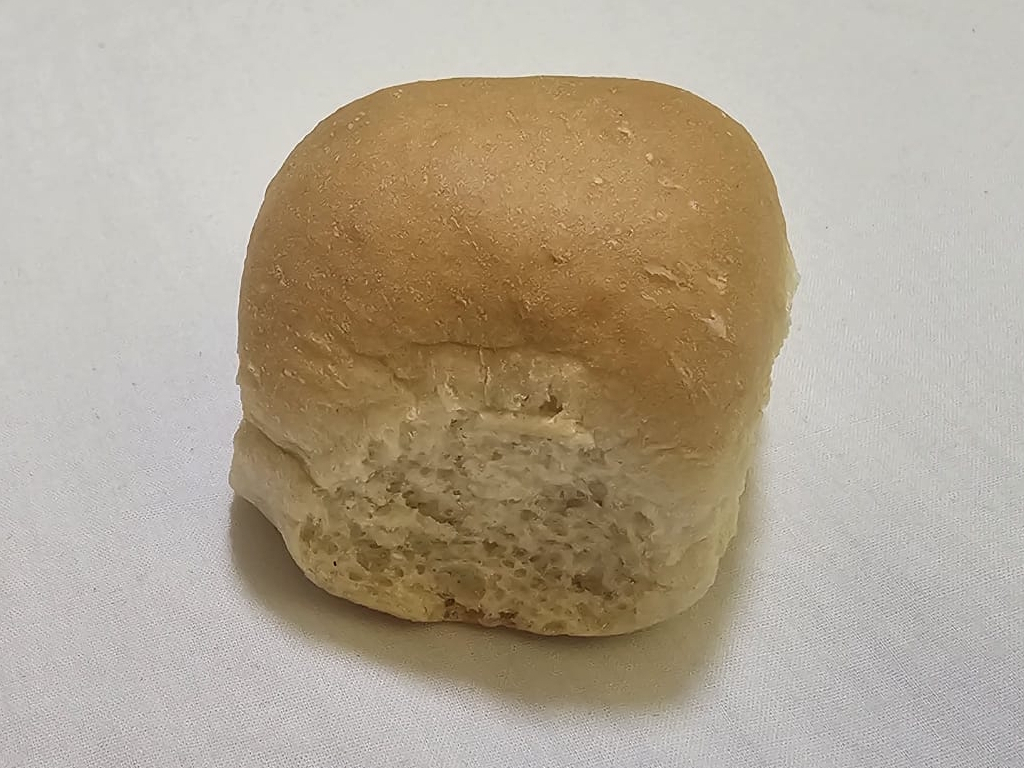
A Dorset knob biscuit made in 2025

Package of Dorset knob biscuits

A Dorset knob is a kind of hard, dry, savoury biscuit from Dorset which is very crumbly and has the consistency of very dry stale bread or rusks. They are roughly 5 cm square and 4 cm high and weigh about 25 g.

== Description ==
Dorset knobs are made from bread dough enriched with extra sugar and butter. They are rolled and shaped by hand, and baked three times.

They are named after their shape's resemblance to Dorset knob buttons, but have also been compared, in size, to door knobs.

Dorset knobs are typically eaten with cheese (for example, Dorset Blue Vinney). Dorset knobs were said by his parlour maid to have been a favourite food of local author Thomas Hardy. As they are so hard, they are also eaten by first soaking them in sweet tea.

== History ==
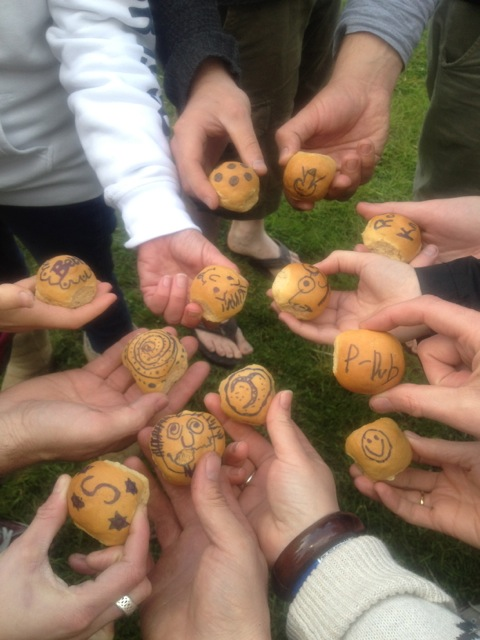
Dorset knobs decorated with personalised designs

In the past there were a number of producers of Dorset knobs. Today the only firm to produce them commercially is Moores Biscuits, which used to be sited in Morcombelake, four miles west of Bridport in the west of the county of Dorset in England, but has now moved into Bridport itself. The Moores family have baked biscuits in Dorset since before 1860. The bakery was established in 1880 by Samuel Moores and manufactures a variety of traditional biscuits in addition to the Dorset knob. Dorset knobs are only produced during the months of January and February. They are normally sold in a distinctive and traditional tin.

== Dorset knob throwing ==
The practice of Dorset knob throwing began in 2008 at a festival in the Dorset village of Cattistock, inspired by a Yorkshire pudding throwing game that the organiser had seen on television.

The competition was for a while held every year on the first Sunday in May. The record throw of 31.9 metres (105 ft) was set in 2019. Other events at the festival included a knob and spoon race, knob darts, knob painting and guess the weight of the knob. The competition venue was Cattistock from 2008 to 2016. Then in 2017, it moved from Cattistock to Kingston Maurward House, about 12 miles away. The event was cancelled in 2018, and there was a plan to make it a biennial event from 2019. In 2024, the event was again held at the Cattistock Countryside Show, near Chilfrome.

The knobs must be thrown underarm with a straight arm. The throw is measured from where the knobs finish rolling and not from where they hit the ground.

Winners of Knob Throwing Championship
Year	Series	Men's champion	Distance (m)	Women's champion	Distance (m)	Under 12s	Distance (m)
2008	1st	Unknown (South Africa)	22.8	Leah Stewart (1)			
2009	2nd	Phillip German-Ribon	26.1	Leah Stewart (2)	20.2	Solo Roper (1)	18.5
2010	3rd	Jack Guitor	25.4	Leah Stewart (3)	16.75	Solo Roper (2)	16.6
2011	4th						
2012	5th	Dave Phillips	29.4	Kelda McNeill	26.45	Max Nuttall	22.55
2013	6th	Kevin Pembroke	25.6	Christina Marshall	19.6	Lewis Bowen	18.0
2014	7th	Dave Morrison	21.8				
2015	8th	Patrick Lisoire	23.7	Alice Cowen	19.0	Jack Courtier-Dutton	18.0
2016	9th	Daniel Guest					
2017	10th	Pete Asher	22.70	Catrin Vaughan	18.65	Samuel Chinchen	16.40
2018	Event Not Held (knob supply issues)						
2019	11th	James Vincent-Smith	31.9				
2020	Event Not Held (COVID-19)						
2021	Event Not Held (COVID-19)						
2022	Event Not Held (outgrown the village's capacity)						
2023	Event Not Held (outgrown the village's capacity)						
2024	12th						
2025	13th	Rob Dansey	32.05	Helen Pidduck	21.0	Munjo	24.6

Multiple Winners
Champion	Wins
Leah Stewart	3
Solo Roper	2
