= David McCheyne Newell =

American journalist

David McCheyne Newell (23 March 1898 – 1986) was an American journalist, novelist, and children's writer perhaps most famous for his books regarding early twentieth-century rural life in West Central Florida. In If Nothin' Don't Happen and The Trouble of It Is the fictional narrator, Billy Driggers, tells true-to-life stories about the people of Florida's Gulf Hammock (the coastal land between Cedar Key and the Withlacoochee River) and the surrounding environs during the interwar years. Earlier writings included The Fishing and Hunting Answer Book, illustrated by Lynn Bogue Hunt, a children's book titled American Animals, "Cougars and Cowboys" (New York. The Century Co., 1927) and numerous short stories and articles.

A naturalist and lifelong hunter, he was also for several years editor of Field and Stream and hosted a nature and hunting show during the early years of television in the 1950s. He accompanied Annie Oakley on hunting trips when she wintered in Florida before her death in 1926. He also befriended fellow Florida author Marjorie Kinnan Rawlings.

== Biography ==
Born in Chicago, Illinois, Newell moved to Leesburg, Florida in 1912. He studied at Washington University in St. Louis enlisting in the United States Army in his junior year. After studying visual arts at the St. Louis School of Fine Arts, Newell went on to become a working journalist and illustrator, writing and creating art for dozens of publications including Life, Field and Stream, Boys' Life, The Saturday Evening Post, the New York Herald-Tribune and the St. Louis Post-Dispatch.

Newell is buried at the cemetery of Holy Trinity Episcopal Church in Fruitland Park, Florida next to his first wife, Frances Bosanquet Newell, with whom he had three daughters. Many of Newell's paintings and letters can be seen at the Leesburg Heritage Museum, in Leesburg, FL, not far from his former home.
