= Singleton =

Singleton may refer to:

== Sciences, technology ==
=== Mathematics ===
- Singleton (mathematics), a set with exactly one element
- Singleton field, used in conformal field theory

=== Computing ===
- Singleton pattern, a design pattern that allows only one instance of a class to exist
- Singleton bound, used in coding theory
- Singleton variable, a variable that is referenced only once
- Singleton, a character encoded with one unit in variable-width encoding schemes for computer character sets
- Singleton, an empty tag or self-closing tag in XHTML or XML coding

=== Social science ===
- Singleton (global governance), a hypothetical world order with a single decision-making agency
- Singleton, a consonant that is not a geminate in linguistics
- Singleton, a person that is not a twin or other multiple birth

== People ==
- Singleton (surname), for a partial list of people with the surname "Singleton"

== Places ==
=== United Kingdom ===
- Singleton, Lancashire, England
- Singleton, West Sussex, England
- Singleton, Kent, England
- Singleton Park, Swansea, Wales
  - Singleton Abbey
  - Singleton Hospital

=== Australia ===
- Singleton, New South Wales
- Singleton Council, New South Wales
- Singleton, Western Australia

== Other uses ==
- Singleton (lifestyle), a self-description of individuals without romantic partners, particularly applied to women in their thirties introduced in the novel and film Bridget Jones's Diary
- The Singleton (film), a 2015 British drama film
- "Singleton" (short story), a short story by Greg Egan
- Singleton (cards), a single card in a suit
- The Singleton, a whisky made by Diageo
- Catawba (grape) or Singleton

== See also ==
- Shingleton (disambiguation)
