= Leesburg International Airport =

Airport in Florida, U.S.

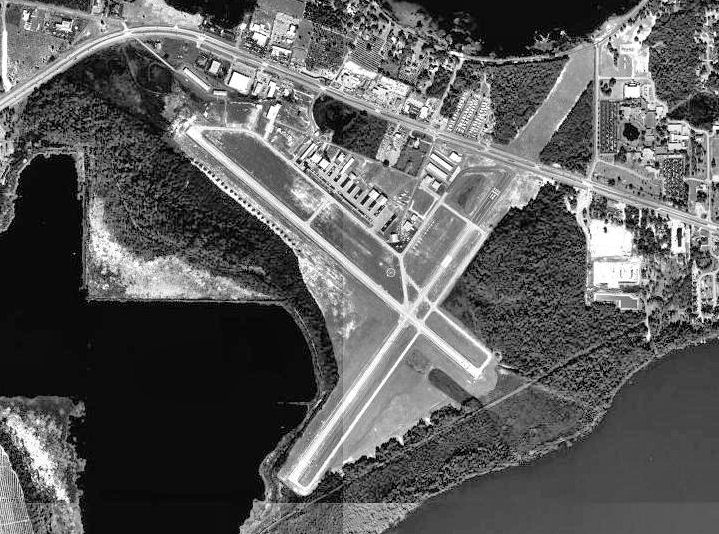
- USGS 1999 orthophoto
- IATA: LEE; ICAO: KLEE; FAA LID: LEE

Summary
- Airport type: Public
- Owner: City of Leesburg, Florida
- Location: Leesburg, Florida
- Elevation AMSL: 76 ft / 23.2 m
- Coordinates: 28°49′23.1″N 081°48′31.4″W
- Website: www.leesburgflorida.gov/airport/

Map
- Location of Leesburg International Airport KLEE (the United States)

Runways
Direction	Length		Surface
Direction	ft	m	Surface
13/31	6,300	1,920	Asphalt
03/21	4,957	1,511	Asphalt

Statistics (2022)
- Aircraft operations: 82,296
- Based aircraft: 128
- Source: Federal Aviation Administration

Leesburg International Airport (IATA: LEE, ICAO: KLEE, FAA LID: LEE), formerly known as Leesburg Regional Airport, is a public airport located three miles (5 km) northeast of the central business district of Leesburg, a city in Lake County, Florida, United States. It is owned by the City of Leesburg.

== Facilities and aircraft ==
Leesburg International Airport covers an area of 818 acres (331 ha) which contains two asphalt paved runways: 3/21 measuring 4,957 x 100 ft (1,511 x 30 m) and 13/31 measuring 6,300 x 100 ft (1,920 x 30 m).

The airport has been designated as a "User Fee" airport by the U.S. Customs and Border Protection, Department of Homeland Security. Offering U.S. Customs and Border Protection service, Leesburg International Airport can serve as the first port of entry for aircraft returning to the continental United States from a foreign country.

Leesburg International Airport has an Airport Rescue Fire Fighting (ARFF) Station that is staffed 7 days per week, 24 hours per day (24/7) with professionally trained and equipped firefighting personnel.

The Air Traffic Control Tower is open 7 days a week from 7:00 a.m. to 7:00 p.m. (0700 to 1900 local) with the Tower Frequency (and CTAF when the tower is closed) being 119.35 and Ground Control being 121.725.

For the 12-month period ending September 30, 2022, the airport had 82,296 aircraft operations, an average of 225 per day: 99% general aviation and <1% military. There are 128 aircraft based at this airport: 88 single-engine, 10 multi-engine, 6 jet and 24 helicopter.

== History ==
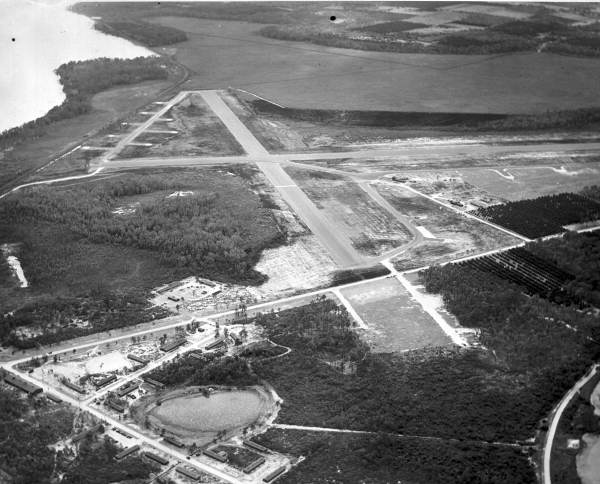
Aerial view looking southwest over the airport circa 1940

Construction began on the airport on November 24, 1941 as a Works Progress Administration (WPA) project. The airport was commissioned in January 1943 as Leesburg Army Airfield (AAF). It was used as a United States Army Air Forces training airfield by the Army Air Force School of Applied Tactics at Orlando Army Air Base.

The airfield was closed after the end of World War II and turned over to the City of Leesburg.

== See also ==
- List of airports in Florida
