= Shingleton (disambiguation) =

Shingleton is an unincorporated community in Munising Township, Michigan.

Shingleton may also refer to:

== People with the surname ==
- Royce Shingleton (born 1935), American professor and author
- Wilfred Shingleton (1914–1983), English art director

== See also ==
- Shingletown, California
- Shingletown, Pennsylvania
- Singleton (disambiguation)
