= Lynn Bogue Hunt =

American wildlife artist and illustrator (1878–1960)

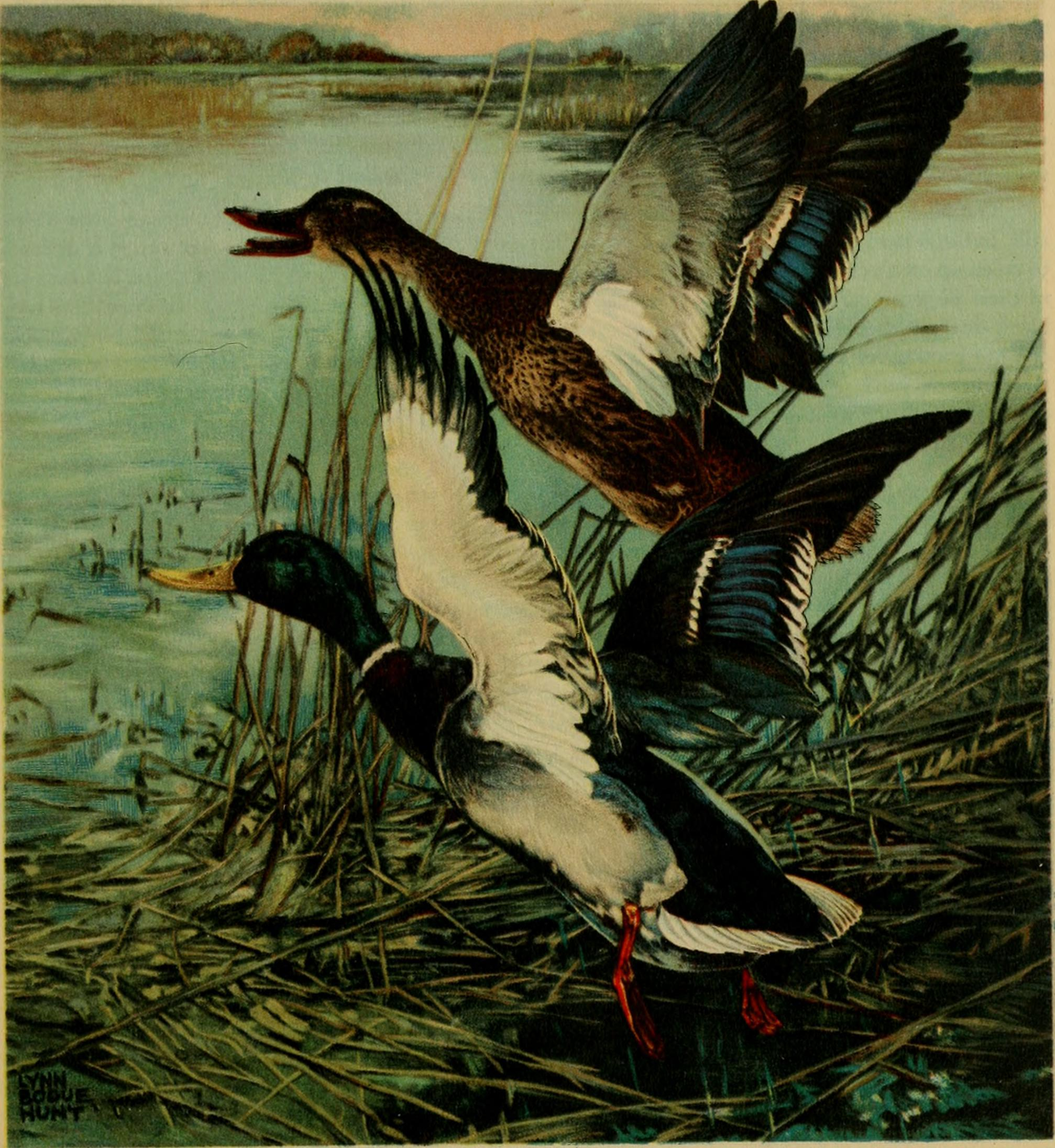
Mallards, from Our American Game Birds (1917)

Lynn Bogue Hunt (1878–1960) was an American wildlife artist, and illustrator of magazines and books.

== Life ==
Hunt was born in Honeoye Falls, New York, in 1878. From age 12 he lived in Albion, Michigan, and graduated from Albion High School in 1897. He then became a student at Albion College. From 1899 he was a staff artist at the Detroit Free Press.

He moved to New York City in 1903, where he was a freelance artist, providing illustrations for magazines, books and advertisements.

Books illustrated included books on waterfowl hunting, upland game bird hunting and saltwater fishing, which were also his own main interests. He illustrated several books published by the Derrydale Press, including Grouse Feathers and More Grouse Feathers by Burton Spiller, and his own book An Artist's Game Bag.

In 1917 Our American Game Birds, a portfolio of 18 color reproductions of paintings by Hunt, was published by DuPont. From 1924 to 1947 he contributed regularly to Field & Stream, providing magazine covers and illustrating articles. He designed the 1939/40 Federal Duck Stamp.

Game Birds of America, 12 color prints published by Field and Stream, appeared in 1944. David McCheyne Newell, editor of Field and Stream, wrote: "[T]here are a very few artists, indeed, who can paint wildlife as the sportsman sees it in the field. Hunt can do this."

His last cover for Field and Stream appeared in 1951. Suffering from failing eyesight, he ceased painting in 1952 and retired to his home in Long Island. He died in Mineola in 1960, aged 82.

== Family ==
He was married to Jessie Bryan Hunt and was a father to Lynn Bogue Hunt Jr. and Bryan Hunt; grandfather to Lynn Bogue Hunt III, Marilynn Hunt Guzelian, Diane Alynn Hunt, and Alan Bryan Hunt; and great grandfather to Katrina Hunt, Doug Hunt, Cody Hunt, Christopher Guzelian, Catherine Guzelian Bazile, Jeffrey Guzelian, Oliver Hunt, and Adrienne Hunt.
