= Leesburg Heritage Museum =

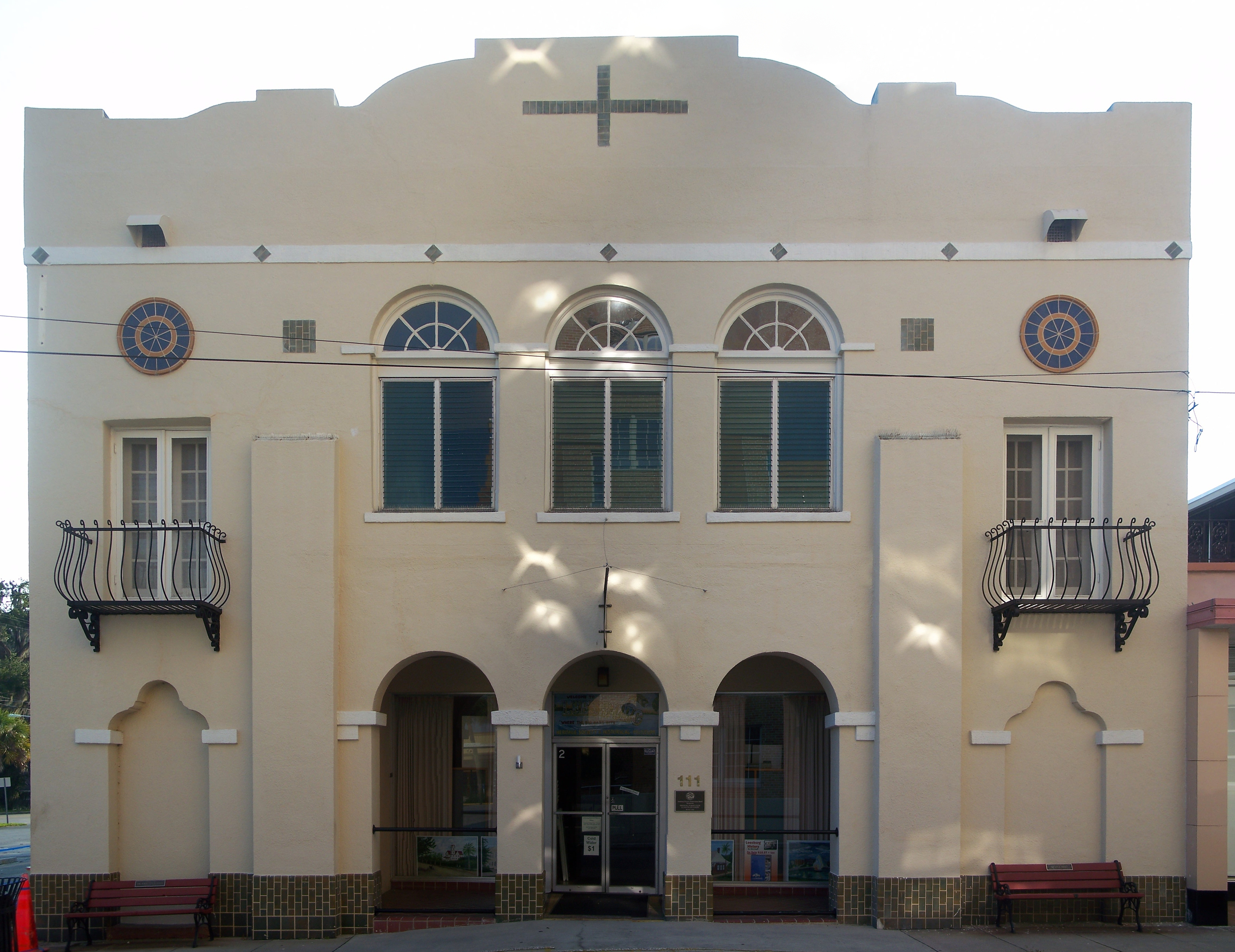

- Location within Florida
- Established: 1990
- Location: 111 South Sixth Street; Leesburg, Florida
- Coordinates: 28.81070°N 81.87801°W
- Type: History museum
- Curator: Rick Reed
- Website: Leesburg Heritage Museum

The Leesburg Heritage Museum is located at 111 South Sixth Street, Leesburg, Florida. It contains exhibits depicting the history of Leesburg. The building itself, constructed in 1922 by the Leesburg Woman's Club, was previously home to various businesses and organizations, including the Leesburg Chamber of Commerce and the Leesburg Library.
