= Beacon College =

College in Florida, United States

- Motto: Lumen Vitae Abundantiorem
- Motto in English: Illuminating the Life Abundant
- Type: Private college
- Established: 1989
- Accreditation: SACS
- Academic affiliations: NAICU; ICUF
- President: George J. Hagerty
- Academic staff: 54
- Administrative staff: 66
- Students: 455
- Location: Leesburg, Florida, United States; 28°48′39″N 81°52′31″W
- Campus: Suburban
- Colors: Blue, gold
- Mascot: Beacon Blazers
- Website: www.beaconcollege.edu

Beacon College is a private college in Leesburg, Florida, United States. It was founded in 1989 and designed with curriculum and support services to serve students with dyslexia, ADHD, or other specific learning disabilities.

Beacon College offers Associate of Arts and Bachelor of Arts degrees. It is accredited by the Southern Association of Colleges and Schools and licensed by the Florida Department of Education.

== History ==
Led by learning-disabilities advocates Marsha Glines, and Patricia and Peter Latham, a group of parents incorporated Beacon College on May 24, 1989. At the time, the Florida Department of Education approved the college's plan to introduce a focused undergraduate curriculum aligned specifically to the specialized learning and support needs of students who learn differently. Beacon awards both Associate of Arts (A.A.) and Bachelor of Arts (B.A.) degrees.

In 2003, Beacon College earned full accreditation from the Southern Association of Colleges and Schools Commission on Colleges (SACSCOC).

In 2020, Beacon College was added to U.S. News and World Report's regional rankings.

== Campus ==
Beacon College is on an urban campus in downtown Leesburg, Florida. The campus covers 20 acres and consists of a series of owned and leased historic buildings and new developments. Campus buildings include five residential complexes, a library, a dining hall, a student center, a fitness center, an art gallery, and two pocket parks.
