= Noor Davis =

American football player (born 1994)

No. 58
- Position: Linebacker

Personal information
- Born: December 15, 1994 (age 31); Los Angeles, California, U.S.
- Listed height: 6 ft 4 in (1.93 m)
- Listed weight: 250 lb (113 kg)

Career information
- High school: Leesburg, Florida
- College: Stanford University (BA, MA); Loyola University Chicago School of Law (JD)
- NFL draft: 2017: undrafted

Career history
- Minnesota Vikings (2017)*
- * Offseason or practice squad member only

Noor Davis (born December 15, 1994) is an American former professional football linebacker. He played college football at Stanford and was signed by the Minnesota Vikings in 2017 as an undrafted free agent. In 2011, he was awarded the Butkus Award for the top linebacker in high school, as well as being named to the first-team of the USA Today All-USA high school football team and participated in the 2012 Under Armour All-America Game. Davis graduated with a Bachelors and Masters from Stanford University.

In 2019, Davis joined the Detroit Lions Front Office working in Player Personnel, after working in Sales Leadership with the Silicon Valley start-up Rubrik.

From 2020-2025, Davis worked for the Big Ten Conference, finishing as Associate Director, Sports Administration & Legal Associate. Davis began his career with the Big Ten Conference in 2020 as the first Fellow in the history of the conference, working directly under Commissioner Kevin Warren. He completed his Juris Doctor at Loyola University Chicago School of Law while simultaneously working with the Big Ten Conference.

Davis currently works in the Front Office of the Chicago Bears as Strategic Executive Partner, Office of the President & CEO.

== Early life ==
A native of Leesburg, Florida, Davis attended The Villages Charter High School for most of his high school career before transferring just before his senior year to Leesburg High School, where he won the 2011 Butkus Award, was an Under Armour All-American linebacker and captain of the 2012 19-U US National Football Team. Regarded as a four-star recruit, Davis was ranked the No. 2 linebacker and No. 25 overall prospect by ESPN and the No. 4 outside linebacker in his class by Rivals.com.

== College career ==
After redshirting his first year at Stanford in 2012, Davis went on to play in 37 games throughout the course of his career (2012–16), amassing 67 total tackles, 2 interceptions, 2 TFL and 3 kick returns for 43 yards. Davis was named to the Academic All-Pac-12 team in 2016. Davis earned four letters as a Linebacker for the Cardinal football team during a span in which the program made three appearances in the Rose Bowl Game (winning two) and won three Pac-12 titles. Davis recorded 5 solo tackles in the 2016 Rose Bowl vs. the Iowa Hawkeyes.

== Professional career ==
=== Minnesota Vikings ===
Davis signed with the Minnesota Vikings as an undrafted free agent on July 28, 2017. He was waived by the Vikings on September 2, 2017.

== Personal life ==
Davis' father, Chris played two years in the NFL, while his uncle, Andre Tippett is an NFL Hall of Famer. Davis' mother is Jana Davis and his brother is Gabriel Davis.
