= Bobby Singleton (police officer) =

Northern Irish police officer

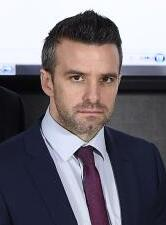
- Singleton in 2019

Deputy Chief Constable of the Police Service of Northern Ireland
- Incumbent
- Assumed office 18 November 2024
- Preceded by: Chris Todd (temporary); Mark Hamilton

Personal details
- Education: Queen's University Belfast
- Profession: Police officer

Robert Singleton is a senior Northern Ireland police officer. He is currently Deputy Chief Constable of the Police Service of Northern Ireland since November 2024.

== Career ==
Singleton was one of the first recruits of the Police Service of Northern Ireland in 2001 and has held a number of positions since joining.

In 2014, he was promoted and became responsible for the delivery of community policing across Belfast, then in 2016, he became head of the newly established Paramilitary Crime Task Force as a Detective Superintendent.

In 2019, he was promoted to Detective Chief Superintendent and became head of the Legacy Investigation Branch.

In 2021, the Northern Ireland Policing Board announced that Singleton had been appointed a temporary Assistant Chief Constable, becoming head of the Community Safety Department. He was made substantive in the role in January 2022.

On 18 November 2024, the Northern Ireland Policing Board selected Singleton as the new Deputy Chief Constable of the Police Service of Northern Ireland.
