= Leesburg, Florida =

- City
- City of Leesburg
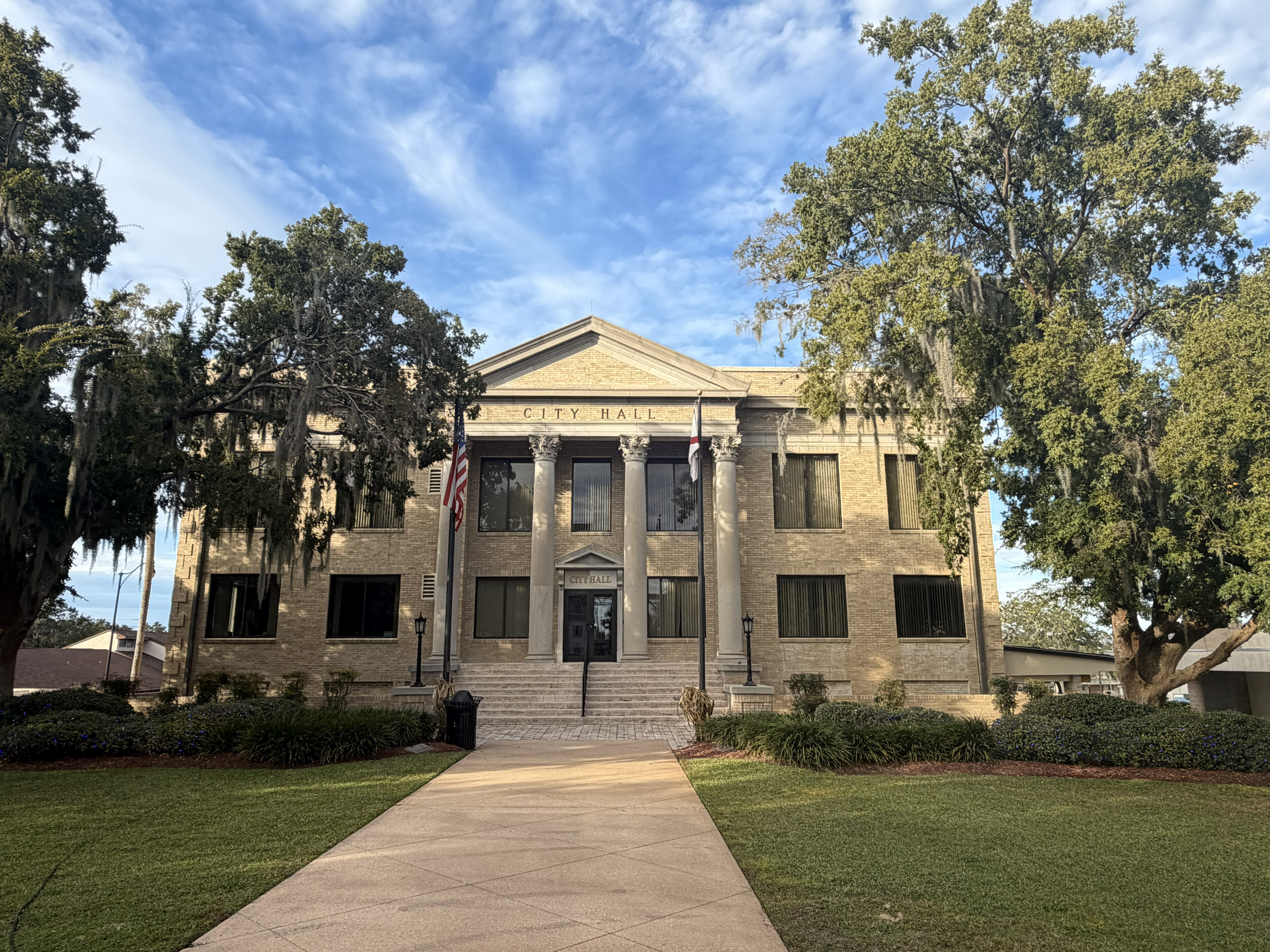
- Leesburg City Hall

- Seal
- Motto: "The Lakefront City"
- Location in Lake County and the state of Florida
- Coordinates: 28°47′36″N 81°51′38″W
- Country: United States
- State: Florida
- County: Lake
- Settled (Leesburg): 1857
- Incorporated (city): July 12, 1875

Government
  - Type: Commission–Manager

Area
  - Total: 41.93 sq mi (108.61 km^{2})
  - Land: 38.45 sq mi (99.58 km^{2})
  - Water: 3.49 sq mi (9.04 km^{2})
- Elevation: 89 ft (27 m)

Population (2020)
  - Total: 27,000
  - Estimate (2025): 38,905
  - Density: 702.3/sq mi (271.15/km^{2})
- Time zone: UTC-5 (Eastern (EST))
  - Summer (DST): UTC-4 (EDT)
- ZIP codes: 34748, 34788
- Area code: 352
- FIPS code: 12-39875
- GNIS feature ID: 2404907
- Website: www.leesburgflorida.gov

Leesburg is a city in Lake County, Florida, United States. As of 2020, the population had exactly 27,000 residents.

Leesburg is in central Florida, between Lake Harris and Lake Griffin, at the head of the Ocklawaha River. It is part of the Orlando–Kissimmee–Sanford Metropolitan Statistical Area.

Lake–Sumter State College and Beacon College are located in Leesburg.

== History ==
Leesburg was first settled in 1857 by Evander McIver Lee and Susannah Lee. Shortly after Evander purchased his first property in the area, his brother Josiah joined him, purchasing land near Montclair Road. Several of his brothers followed him to the area. One of them, John Calvin Lee, was credited with giving the town its name. The city was incorporated in 1875, and was designated as the county seat of Sumter County for a time. When Lake County was formed in 1887, Tavares was designated as its seat. It was officially incorporated as the "City of Leesburg" on July 12, 1875.

In the early 20th century, Leesburg was an important center for watermelon production. In 1930, it held its first Watermelon Festival, an annual tradition that lasted for nearly 30 years. But gradually watermelon production dwindled and, for the last festival in 1957, watermelons had to be brought to the city from outside the area.

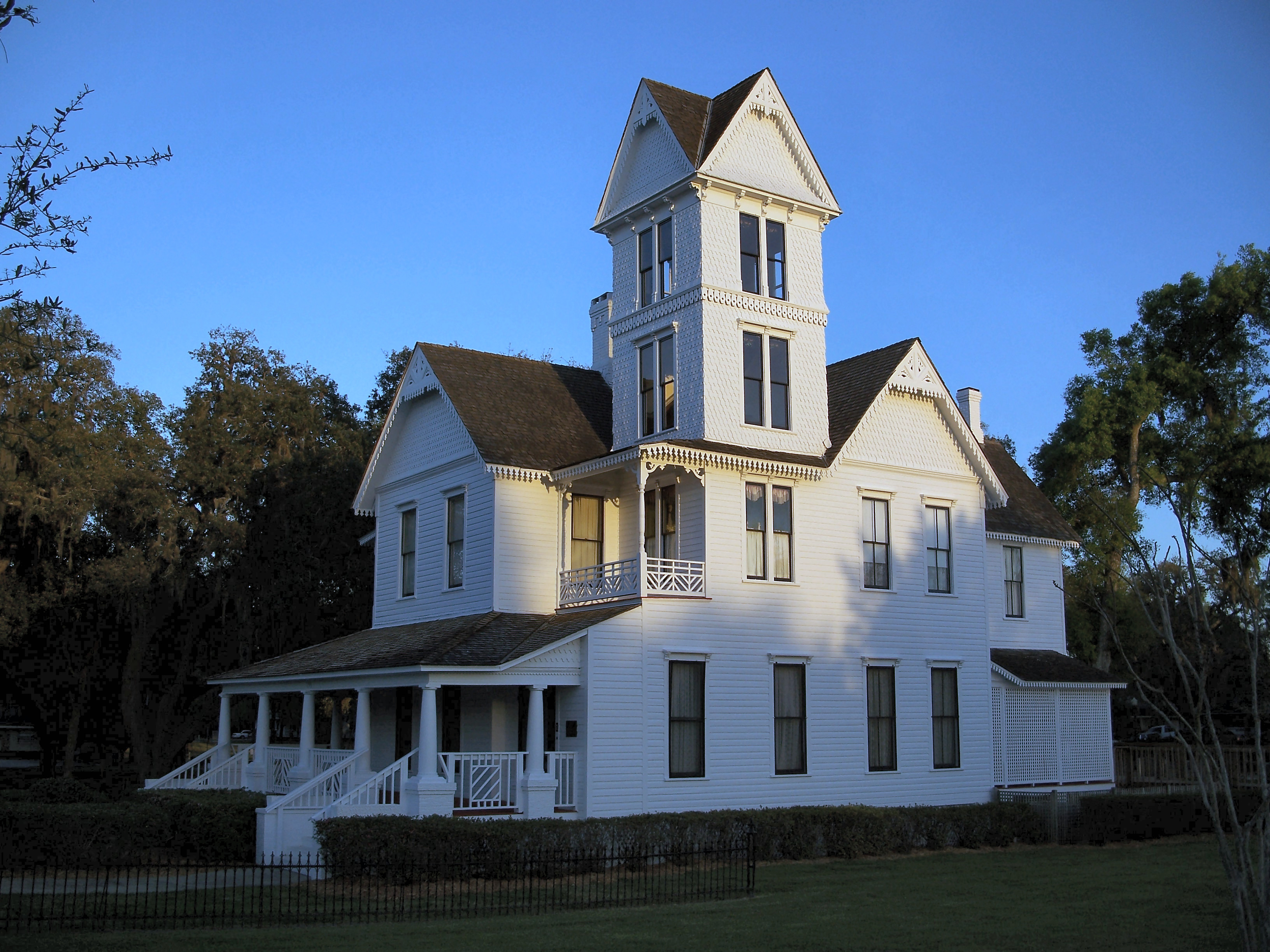
Mote-Morris House

In 1938, during the Great Depression, the Franklin D. Roosevelt administration invested in infrastructure and improvement projects across the county. Its Works Progress Administration began work on the Venetian Gardens waterside park, located on the shores of Lake Harris. These canals and gardens have been a centerpiece of the community ever since.

Lake Square Mall, the city's major shopping mall, opened in 1980.

On March 19, 1982, Ozzy Osbourne's guitarist Randy Rhoads, as well as the band's makeup artist and bus driver, were killed in a plane crash at Flying Baron Estates.

The citrus industry was the principal business in this area for decades, but devastating freezes in December 1983 and February 1985 persuaded growers to move their groves further south. In 1997, Leesburg Bikefest started. It has since become an annual spring tradition, with upwards of 250,000 people attending every year.

Today, most of Leesburg's growth and economic development is the result of its increasing popularity as a retirement destination. In addition, the rapid growth of nearby Orlando has resulted in demand for housing here, as many people commute to Orlando for work. In 1977, 2011, 2016 and 2017, the Leesburg High School boys' basketball team won the FHSAA Class 4A State Championship, with the back to back 16/17 championships happening under head coach Sean Campbell.

In spring 2017, the Holding Company of the Villages planned to acquire 2,600 acres north and south of County Road 470 along the east side of Florida’s Turnpike for future development. The deal with the mega-retirement community has passed due diligence by the Leesburg City Commission. Age-restricted zoning ordinance changes have already been approved by the Leesburg Planning Commission (with the city commission giving final approval). The initial plans call for building approximately 4,500 homes and some commercial development.

== Geography ==
According to the United States Census Bureau, the city has a total area of 24.4 square miles (63 km^{2}), of which 18.7 square miles (48 km^{2}) is land and 5.8 square miles (15 km^{2}) (23.65%) is water.

Leesburg is located 44.5 miles NNW of Orlando, 270 miles N of Miami, and 221 miles SW of Tallahassee, the state capital.

Several major highways pass through Leesburg, including U.S. Highway 27, U.S. Highway 441 and S.R. 44. Florida's Turnpike passes just to the south and west of Leesburg. Leesburg was on the western leg of the Dixie Highway.

=== Climate ===
The climate in this area is characterized by hot, humid summers and generally mild winters. According to the Köppen climate classification, the City of Leesburg has a humid subtropical climate zone (Cfa).

Climate data for Leesburg, Florida (Leesburg International Airport), 1991–2020 normals, extremes 1958–present
Month	Jan	Feb	Mar	Apr	May	Jun	Jul	Aug	Sep	Oct	Nov	Dec	Year
Record high °F (°C)	86 (30)	89 (32)	92 (33)	95 (35)	99 (37)	100 (38)	100 (38)	101 (38)	100 (38)	97 (36)	90 (32)	87 (31)	101 (38)
Mean maximum °F (°C)	81.5 (27.5)	84.3 (29.1)	86.5 (30.3)	89.7 (32.1)	94.3 (34.6)	96.2 (35.7)	96.4 (35.8)	96.0 (35.6)	94.4 (34.7)	90.7 (32.6)	85.7 (29.8)	82.4 (28.0)	97.8 (36.6)
Mean daily maximum °F (°C)	69.9 (21.1)	73.3 (22.9)	77.3 (25.2)	82.7 (28.2)	88.1 (31.2)	90.7 (32.6)	91.1 (32.8)	91.7 (33.2)	89.7 (32.1)	84.5 (29.2)	77.3 (25.2)	72.4 (22.4)	82.4 (28.0)
Daily mean °F (°C)	59.4 (15.2)	62.6 (17.0)	66.6 (19.2)	72.2 (22.3)	77.9 (25.5)	81.9 (27.7)	83.0 (28.3)	83.3 (28.5)	81.4 (27.4)	75.3 (24.1)	67.2 (19.6)	62.2 (16.8)	72.8 (22.7)
Mean daily minimum °F (°C)	48.9 (9.4)	52.0 (11.1)	56.0 (13.3)	61.7 (16.5)	67.7 (19.8)	73.1 (22.8)	74.9 (23.8)	75.0 (23.9)	73.1 (22.8)	66.1 (18.9)	57.1 (13.9)	52.0 (11.1)	63.1 (17.3)
Mean minimum °F (°C)	31.4 (−0.3)	35.2 (1.8)	39.7 (4.3)	48.3 (9.1)	57.7 (14.3)	67.3 (19.6)	70.6 (21.4)	71.3 (21.8)	66.2 (19.0)	51.9 (11.1)	41.6 (5.3)	35.9 (2.2)	29.8 (−1.2)
Record low °F (°C)	16 (−9)	23 (−5)	25 (−4)	32 (0)	46 (8)	53 (12)	62 (17)	62 (17)	52 (11)	39 (4)	24 (−4)	16 (−9)	16 (−9)
Average precipitation inches (mm)	2.51 (64)	2.08 (53)	3.22 (82)	2.04 (52)	2.68 (68)	6.98 (177)	5.88 (149)	6.63 (168)	5.21 (132)	2.62 (67)	1.76 (45)	2.17 (55)	43.78 (1,112)
Average precipitation days (≥ 0.01 in)	8.6	7.6	6.8	6.2	6.7	15.2	16.9	16.6	13.5	7.7	7.5	8.4	121.7
Source: NOAA

== Demographics ==
Historical population
Census	Pop.	Note	%±
1880	200		—
1890	722		261.0%
1900	765		6.0%
1910	991		29.5%
1920	1,835		85.2%
1930	4,113		124.1%
1940	4,687		14.0%
1950	7,395		57.8%
1960	11,172		51.1%
1970	11,869		6.2%
1980	13,191		11.1%
1990	14,903		13.0%
2000	15,956		7.1%
2010	20,117		26.1%
2020	27,000		34.2%
2025 (est.)	38,905		44.1%
U.S. Decennial Census 2020

=== Racial and ethnic composition ===
Leesburg racial composition (Hispanics excluded from racial categories) (NH = Non-Hispanic)
Race	Pop 2010	Pop 2020	% 2010	% 2020
White (NH)	11,917	13,978	59.24%	51.77%
Black or African American (NH)	5,560	6,811	27.64%	25.23%
Native American or Alaska Native (NH)	55	63	0.27%	0.23%
Asian (NH)	340	520	1.69%	1.93%
Pacific Islander or Native Hawaiian (NH)	43	78	0.21%	0.29%
Some other race (NH)	17	190	0.08%	0.70%
Two or more races/Multiracial (NH)	380	1,115	1.89%	4.13%
Hispanic or Latino (any race)	1,805	4,245	8.97%	15.72%
Total	20,117	27,000		

=== 2020 census ===
As of the 2020 census, Leesburg had a population of 27,000. The median age was 43.7 years. 22.0% of residents were under the age of 18 and 26.6% of residents were 65 years of age or older. For every 100 females there were 85.7 males, and for every 100 females age 18 and over there were 82.3 males age 18 and over.

98.0% of residents lived in urban areas, while 2.0% lived in rural areas.

There were 11,348 households in Leesburg, of which 26.2% had children under the age of 18 living in them. Of all households, 37.0% were married-couple households, 18.5% were households with a male householder and no spouse or partner present, and 36.2% were households with a female householder and no spouse or partner present. About 31.4% of all households were made up of individuals and 16.3% had someone living alone who was 65 years of age or older.

There were 13,109 housing units, of which 13.4% were vacant. The homeowner vacancy rate was 2.8% and the rental vacancy rate was 12.6%.

Racial composition as of the 2020 census
Race	Number	Percent
White	15,100	55.9%
Black or African American	7,007	26.0%
American Indian and Alaska Native	118	0.4%
Asian	532	2.0%
Native Hawaiian and Other Pacific Islander	80	0.3%
Some other race	1,463	5.4%
Two or more races	2,700	10.0%
Hispanic or Latino (of any race)	4,245	15.7%

=== 2010 census ===
As of the 2010 United States census, there were 20,117 people, 8,684 households, and 5,144 families residing in the city.

=== 2000 census ===
As of the census of 2000, there were 15,956 people, 6,775 households, and 4,078 families residing in the city. The population density was 854.8 inhabitants per square mile (330.0/km^{2}). There were 7,742 housing units at an average density of 414.8 units per square mile (160.2 units/km^{2}). The racial makeup of the city was 66.60% White, 29.12% African American, 0.27% Native American, 1.33% Asian, 0.01% Pacific Islander, 1.26% from other races, and 1.41% from two or more races. Hispanic or Latino of any race were 4.12% of the population.

In 2000, there were 6,775 households, out of which 24.5% had children under the age of 18 living with them, 39.6% were married couples living together, 16.8% had a female householder with no husband present, and 39.8% were non-families. 33.9% of all households were made up of individuals, and 18.1% had someone living alone who was 65 years of age or older. The average household size was 2.26 and the average family size was 2.86.

In 2000, in the city, the population was spread out, with 23.5% under the age of 18, 7.8% from 18 to 24, 22.7% from 25 to 44, 19.7% from 45 to 64, and 26.2% who were 65 years of age or older. The median age was 42 years. For every 100 females, there were 83.8 males. For every 100 females age 18 and over, there were 78.2 males.

In 2000, the median income for a household in the city was $25,988, and the median income for a family was $33,250. Males had a median income of $25,840 versus $20,888 for females. The per capita income for the city was $15,762. About 16.2% of families and 19.8% of the population were below the poverty line, including 35.3% of those under age 18 and 11.9% of those age 65 or over.

== Arts and culture ==
The Leesburg Public Library was founded in 1875. The library moved to the Venetian Gardens in 1953 when Leesburg established a library charter, and in 2007, it moved to a 42,000-square-foot (3,900 m^{2}) building. The library joined the Lake County Library System in 2002.

The Leesburg Center for the Arts is a nonprofit founded in 2000 to provide art education and exhibitions.

The Leesburg African American Museum contains African-American artifacts.

The Melon Patch Players is a nonprofit theater group founded in 1951.

== Sports ==
=== Baseball ===
From 1922 to 1924, the city's Cooke Field was used by the Philadelphia Phillies for their spring training sessions. On March 14, 1923, the stadium was used for the site of an exhibition game between the Phillies and the St. Louis Cardinals. In 1936, the city built the Ballpark at Venetian Gardens, which was used by several minor league baseball clubs that played in the Florida State League from 1937 to 1968. The city won league titles in 1941 and 1946. Since 2007, the city has been the home of the Leesburg Lightning, a wood-bat collegiate summer baseball team in the Florida Collegiate Summer League.

=== Shooting exhibitions ===
During the 1920s, sharpshooter Annie Oakley, who had a residence in Leesburg, performed shooting exhibitions at Cooke Field, including one for the Philadelphia Phillies.

== Education ==
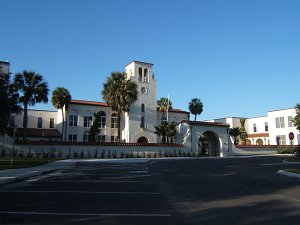
Leesburg High School

=== Public schools ===
Lake County Schools operates public primary and secondary schools:

==== Public high school ====
- Leesburg High School

==== Public middle schools ====
- Carver Middle School
- Oak Park Middle School

==== Public elementary schools ====
- Beverly Shores Elementary School
- Leesburg Elementary School
- Treadway Elementary School

==== Other public school ====
- Rimes Early Learning and Literacy Center

=== Private schools ===
- First Academy-Leesburg
- Saint Paul Catholic School-Leesburg

=== Colleges ===
- Beacon College
- Lake–Sumter State College

== Infrastructure ==
=== Highways ===
- US 27
- US 441
- SR 44

=== Bus ===
- Leesburg is served by LakeXpress buses.

=== Aviation ===
- Leesburg International Airport is a hub of JetSky airlines, and serves Lake, Sumter, and Marion counties.

== Notable people ==
- Abe Anellis, a food microbiologist born in Mahilyow, Belarus, retired in Leesburg in 1977
- Vince Fechtel Jr., politician
- Susan Harrison, actress
- Virgil D. Hawkins, African-American attorney and civil rights activist
- Jonathan Hay, music producer, publicist
- Syd Herlong, politician
- Dan Hinote, St. Louis Blues center, born in Leesburg
- Bill McBride, former candidate for Florida governor, husband of former Florida CFO Alex Sink, grew up in Leesburg
- David McCheyne Newell, author, journalist
- Ginger Minj (Joshua Allen Eads), drag queen
- George Stephen Morrison, raised in Leesburg, father of Jim Morrison of The Doors
- Austin "Red" Robbins, ABA player, born in Leesburg
- Brady Singer, professional baseball pitcher for the Kansas City Royals
- Robert S Singleton, American engineer and scientist, graduated from Leesburg High School
- Johnny Thunder, singer
- Lillian Vickers-Smith, first female newspaper sports editor and writer for the Leesburg Commercial
