= Mark Hamilton (police officer) =

British policeman

Mark Hamilton OBE

Deputy Chief Constable of the Police Service of Northern Ireland
- In office 31 January 2020 – 19 September 2024
- Preceded by: Drew Harris
- Succeeded by: Bobby Singleton

Personal details
- Education: Trinity College Dublin, Queen's University Belfast, University of Leicester
- Profession: Police officer

Mark Hamilton OBE is a former senior Northern Ireland police officer. He served as the Deputy Chief Constable of the Police Service of Northern Ireland from January 2020 until his retirement in September 2024.

== Career ==
Hamilton began working with the Royal Ulster Constabulary in 1994. In March 2009, he was promoted to Chief Superintendent and District Commander for 'A' District, North and West Belfast. He joined the senior leadership team in July 2013 as Assistant Chief Constable for the Service Improvement Department.

Hamilton was made an Officer of the Most Excellent Order of the British Empire in the 2019 Birthday Honours for services to policing and the community in Northern Ireland.

In January 2020, the Northern Ireland Policing Board selected Hamilton to be the Deputy Chief Constable of the Police Service of Northern Ireland. He took over following Drew Harris's move to the Garda Síochána as their new Commissioner.

In September 2024, it was confirmed that Hamilton would retire from policing.
