= Helen Singleton =

Activist

- Born: November 27, 1932 (age 93); Philadelphia, Pennsylvania
- Education: Santa Monica College; University of California, Los Angeles; Loyola Marymount University
- Known for: Freedom Rider
- Spouse: Robert Singleton

Helen Singleton (born November 27, 1932) is an American activist who was active during Civil Rights Movement, most notable for her participation as a Freedom Rider in Jackson, Mississippi.

== Personal life ==
Singleton was born Helen Irene Williams on November 27, 1932, in Philadelphia, to Calvin and Victoria Williams. She spent her childhood in Philadelphia, where her father worked as a chauffeur, while living most of her adult life in Southern California. Growing up with eight siblings, they frequently spent Summer vacations at her grandparents' farm in Virginia. It was because of the segregation she witnessed as a child during those summer trips with her mother that she later became a civil rights activist. "We could feel her exhaustion and the tension in the car," Singleton recalled. "And when we got there, there was always some incident — stores we couldn't go in because it's not the right day for blacks to shop.... It marred the joy of our summer vacations. I carried that with me for a long time."

In 1955, while Singleton was a freshman at Santa Monica College, she married Robert Singleton in Monterey, California, where he was stationed at the time in the U. S. Military.

Helen Singleton later transferred to University of California, Los Angeles (UCLA), alternating college with child-raising, graduating in the year 1974 with a major in fine arts. She got her Master of Public Administration in 1985 from Loyola Marymount University, and then she worked at UCLA developing courses, special programs, and a symposium on the arts and humanities. In 1992, Singleton began working as a consultant for arts groups, including the California Arts Council, the Los Angeles County Museum of Art, and the Missouri Arts Council. She retired in 1999, and lives in Inglewood, California, with her husband. As of 2015, she gives talks and speeches about her time as a Freedom Rider.

== Activism ==
Singleton's activism began around the summer of 1961. "In the summer of 1961, as an undergraduate, I became a Freedom Rider along with a group of students from UCLA, and other campuses in Los Angeles. My husband, Robert Singleton, was one of the organizers of the group. The Freedom Rider movement, which tested discrimination in travel accommodations, was one of several forms of non-violent civil disobedience that we undertook to bring about social change. We were arrested and incarcerated at Parchman Penitentiary near Jackson, Mississippi." The exact date of Helen and Robert Singleton's arrest was July 30, 1961. In the 2010 documentary Freedom Riders, Singleton spoke about how she was arrested at the Illinois Central train station. She also described the conditions under which she was arrested:

- The paddywagon was laid out in the sun, make sure it was hot for everyone inside.
- The policeman simply said, "Are y'all gonna move?" He asked us more than one time, and we didn't. We were taken to the city jail. The person booking us was using what looked like an elementary school composition book. He said, "What school do you go to?" I said, "Santa Monica City College." He said, "How do you spell Santa Monica?" I was young at the time and though he should know how to spell.
- We went to New Orleans and got more training in nonviolence. We were told the night before, "Don't go into town unless you have at least a dollar." You could get arrested.
- When we got off the train, there were men standing around with dark glasses. I assumed they were FBI, but turns out they were Mississippi Sovereignty Commission. I saw a sign that said "White Only" and so the group and I walked in and sat down. I felt free, we were asked to leave, but we were committed to this.... We were surprised, but the arresting officer was actually black.
