= Leesburg High School (Leesburg, Florida) =

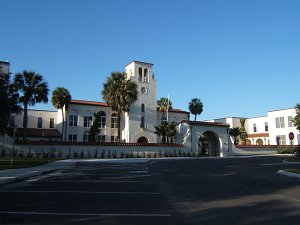

Location
- 1402 Yellow Jacket Way; Leesburg, Florida 34748-5643; United States; 28°48′29″N 81°53′25″W

Information
- Type: Public
- Motto: Moving on up!
- Established: c. 1927
- School district: Lake County Schools
- Principal: Andrea Pyatt.
- Teaching staff: 80.00 (FTE)
- Grades: 9 to 12
- Enrollment: 1,774 (2023–2024)
- Student to teacher ratio: 22.18
- Color
- Mascot: Yellow Jacket
- Website: lhs.lake.k12.fl.us

Leesburg High School is a public high school located in Leesburg, Florida, United States, and is one of seven public high schools in Lake County, Florida. The school is made up of approximately 1,500 students. The current principal is Andrea Pyatt.

== History ==
Leesburg High School was established in 1926. For 42 years, it served white students only. After the federal government mandated integration, African-American children who had previously attended Carver Heights High School and Lake County Training School were reassigned to Leesburg High School in 1968. Some of the faculty from the black schools were retained, usually with reduced responsibilities. Carver Heights was repurposed as a middle school. Students from Carver Heights were amazed at the facilities and equipment enjoyed by the white students.

== Boys basketball ==
The school won state championships in 1977, 2011, 2016 and 2017.

== Postsecondary academic opportunities ==
- Cambridge AICE
- Advanced Placement
- Dual enrollment (through Lake–Sumter State College and the University of Florida)

== Programs ==
- Band (Swarm Of Sound)

== Honor societies ==
- Beta Club
- Mu Alpha Theta
- National Honors Society
- National Science Honors Society
- National Art Honors Society

== Notable alumni ==
- Roger Holt, Former MLB player (New York Yankees)
- Greg Johnson, Former American football defensive lineman for the Philadelphia Eagles, Chicago Bears, Baltimore Colts, and the Tampa Bay Buccaneers
- Danny Trevathan, Former American football linebacker for the Denver Broncos and the Chicago Bears, Super Bowl 50 Champion
- Robert S. Singleton, American engineer
- Noor Davis, Former American football linebacker for the Minnesota Vikings
- Keith Truenow, politician
- Keon Ellis, Professional basketball player Cleveland Cavaliers
