= Robert Singleton (activist) =

Robert Singleton, also known as Bob Singleton (born 1936), is a civil rights activist. He and his wife Helen Singleton are known for being part of the Freedom Rides together in Jackson, Mississippi. He currently teaches economics at Loyola Marymount University, where he has been for over twenty years.

== Life and education ==
Robert was born and raised in Philadelphia. He joined the army and served in Europe. When he came back from war, he went to school at the University of California, Los Angeles. This is where he studied economics and also went for his undergraduate. In 1964, he received his Ph.D. and then went on to teach at UCLA for a few years. Robert began his activism at UCLA when he ran for president of their chapter for the NAACP. During his time on campus, he became inspired by the speakers that came and spoke, including James Farmer, Malcolm X, James Baldwin, and Langston Hughes, each of whom helped him realize the injustices in America. He first joined the sit-ins, where he met other activists and helped them organize events where they would find food and clothing, get sharecroppers to vote, and organize the freedom rider to Jackson, Mississippi. When he returned, the NAACP had been kicked out of the school, so it was replaced with a CORE group, of which he was chair.

== Freedom Rides ==
Robert Singleton and his wife are most known for the Freedom Rides that they took part of in Jackson, Mississippi. The south ignored the ruling that the U.S. Supreme Court made about public transportation not being segregated because segregation was unconstitutional. As a result, they protested against segregation on public transportation. On July 30, 1961, when they got to Mississippi, Robert, his wife, and the other riders were arrested and sent to Parchmen Penitentiary. The conditions in the prison were harsh. They were put in maximum security, separated from each other, and placed next to the gas chambers. "Three months after the freedom rides they were to desegregate public transportation. Robert and Helen Singleton were among the few married couples who participated in the Freedom Rides.
