= Clermont chain of lakes =

Lakes in Clermont, Florida, United States

The Clermont chain of lakes is a chain of lakes centered on Clermont, Florida. The chain is orientated from southeast to northwest and fed primarily by streams and groundwater flow. They make up the middle part of the Palatlakaha River watershed which forms the headwaters of the Ocklawaha River. The lakes are notable for their red to tea-colored water from tannic acid.

== Main lakes ==
The three largest lakes, Louisa, Minnehaha, and Minneola constitute the main part of the chain.

=== Louisa ===
Lake Louisa
- Location within Florida
- Location: Lake County, Florida
- Coordinates: 28°28′52″N 81°44′23″W
- Lake type: natural freshwater lake
- Basin countries: United States
- Max. length: 3.29 miles (5.29 km)
- Max. width: 2.24 miles (3.60 km)
- Surface area: 3,573 acres (1,446 ha)
- Max. depth: 16 feet (4.9 m)
- Surface elevation: 85 feet (26 m)

Louisa the largest lake, is shallow and flat-bottomed at around 10 feet (3.0 m). It features Lake Louisa State Park on its southern shore. The rest of the lakeshore is developed with suburban subdivisions. Through the park flows the primary inflows of the lake. Little Creek originates from the Lake/Polk County border and Big Creek starts from the area of the Green Swamp adjacent to the Lake Wales Ridge around Lake Lowery in Polk County as Green Swamp Run.

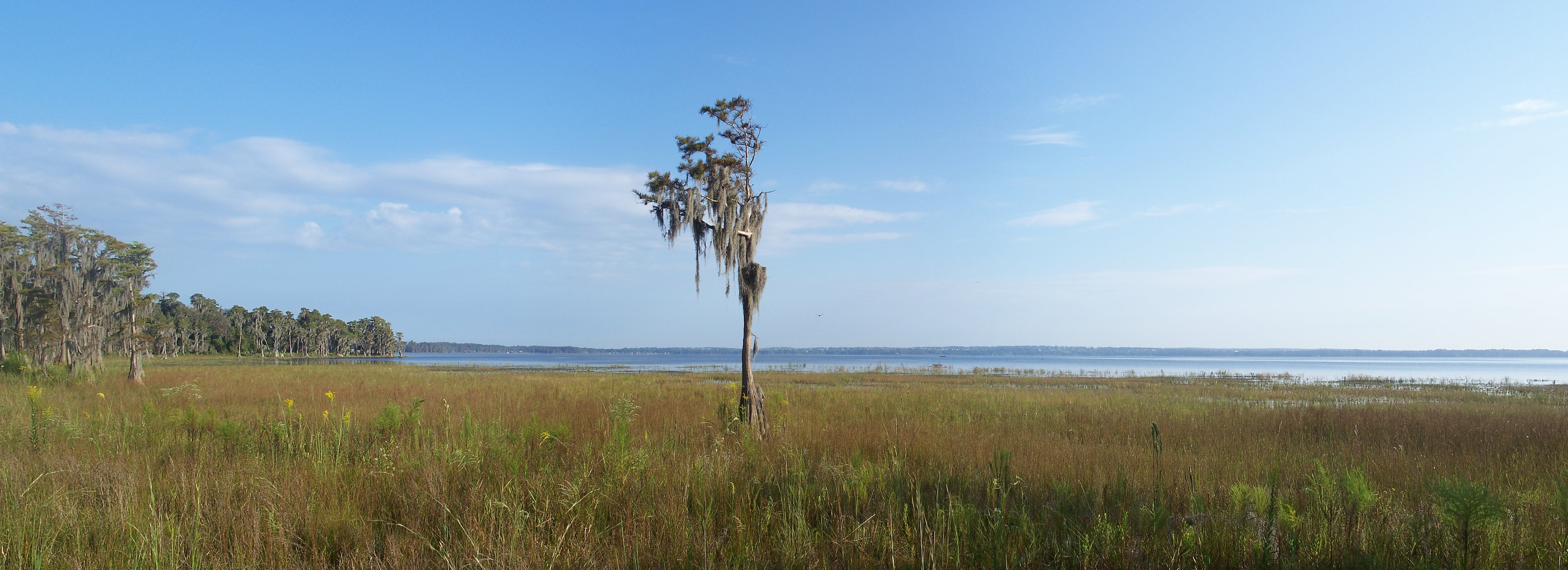
Lake Louisa

From the north end of Lake Louisa flows Crooked Creek into Lake Susan, a small lake with similar depth to Lake Louisa surrounded by swampland. There is a public boat ramp on Crooked Creek.

=== Minnehaha ===
Lake Minnehaha
- Location within Florida
- Location: Lake County, Florida
- Coordinates: 28°32′00″N 81°45′56″W
- Lake type: natural freshwater lake
- Basin countries: United States
- Max. length: 2.56 miles (4.12 km)
- Max. width: 1.75 miles (2.82 km)
- Surface area: 2,410.76 acres (976 ha)
- Max. depth: 18 feet (5.5 m)
- Surface elevation: 95 feet (29 m)

A short river connects Lake Susan to Lake Minnehaha, the second largest lake. Minnehaha averages 14 feet (4.3 m) in depth with areas over 18 feet (5.5 m) deep. Lake Minnehaha is more developed than Louisa with suburban housing along all but a bay on its northwest shoreline, Cypress Cove, which is swampland unsuitable for development.

From Lake Minnehaha a neck connects it to Lake Palatlakaha which is undeveloped except for an active adult community on its eastern shore. A canal connects Lake Palatlakaha to Lake Hiawatha, also mostly undeveloped aside from the Clermont community of Hiawatha Shores and the former Jahna West Clermont Sand Mine which is being converted into a community on the south shore.

=== Minneola ===
Lake Minneola
- Location within Florida
- Location: Lake County, Florida
- Coordinates: 28°34′31″N 81°46′06″W
- Lake type: natural freshwater lake
- Basin countries: United States
- Max. length: 2.24 miles (3.60 km)
- Max. width: 2.19 miles (3.52 km)
- Surface area: 1,890 acres (765 ha)
- Max. depth: 30 ft (9.1 m)
- Surface elevation: 81 ft (25 m)

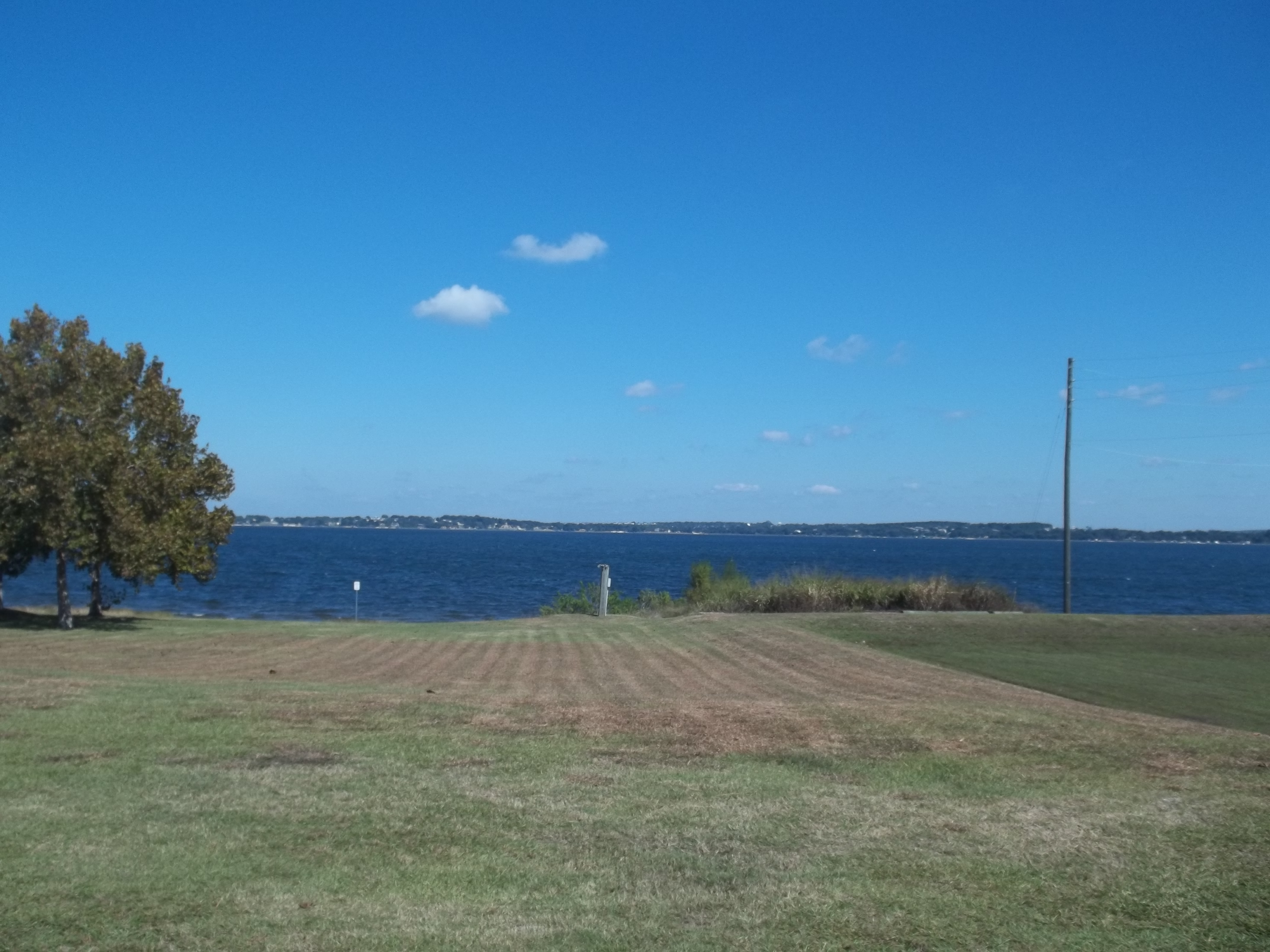
Lake Minneola

A neck separates Lake Hiawatha from Lake Minneola the third largest lake in the chain and the deepest at around 18 feet (5.5 m) in depth with parts close to downtown Clermont approaching near 30 feet (9.1 m) in depth. Minneola is also the most developed lake with downtown Clermont and Minneola along its south and eastern shores. The Palatlakaha River flows out of Crystal Cove on its northwest shore. There is a public boat ramp and swimming area on Waterfront Park. Lake Louisa is the largest lake on that chain of lakes that feeds Lake Hiawatha, Lake Minneola, Lake Susan and Lake Minnehaha. Lake Louisa lakefront is mostly aprotected area as the green swamp at the south is the fresh water source for the area.

== Smaller Lakes ==
Among the main chain of lakes are smaller lakes connected to them.

Dixie Lake is the largest lake within Lake Louisa State Park and during high water levels flows into Big Creek. There are rental cabins on its south shore.

Crescent Lake in the suburb of South Clermont is connected to Lake Minnehaha via Lake Hattie and Lake Williamee through a canal connecting the four. Crescent Lake has a bay at its south end, Crescent Cove separated by private island. Hattie lake is round-shaped and has 3 private community boat ramps. Williamee is mostly shallow and plant covered.

Lake Winona in Clermont is on a peninsula separating Minneola from Minnehaha, it's connected to Minnehaha by a canal which it is of similar depth to with deeper areas like Minneola.

== Northern Chain ==
North of the main chain the Palatlakaha River is lined with 8 lakes the surrounding area of which is within the city of Groveland.

Hunt and Cook lakes are undeveloped and surrounded by swampland. Cherry Lake is the 4th largest lake and has rural development on its north shore. It approaches 18 feet (5.5 m) in depth averaging 10 feet (3.0 m). Hunt and Stewart Lake are like Cherry Lake with rural development on their north side and swampland on their south side. There is a water level control dam between Hunt and Cherry Lakes.

Lakes Lucy and Emma are surrounded by rural development and sandy hills. Lucy is around 10 feet (3.0 m) in depth while Emma is deeper at 14 feet. Heart Lake is separated from the Palatlakaha River by a dike with a water level control dam in it. After Heart Lake the Palatlakaha River flows to Lake Harris.
