= Lake Louisa State Park =

Park in Florida, USA

- IUCN category III (natural monument or feature)
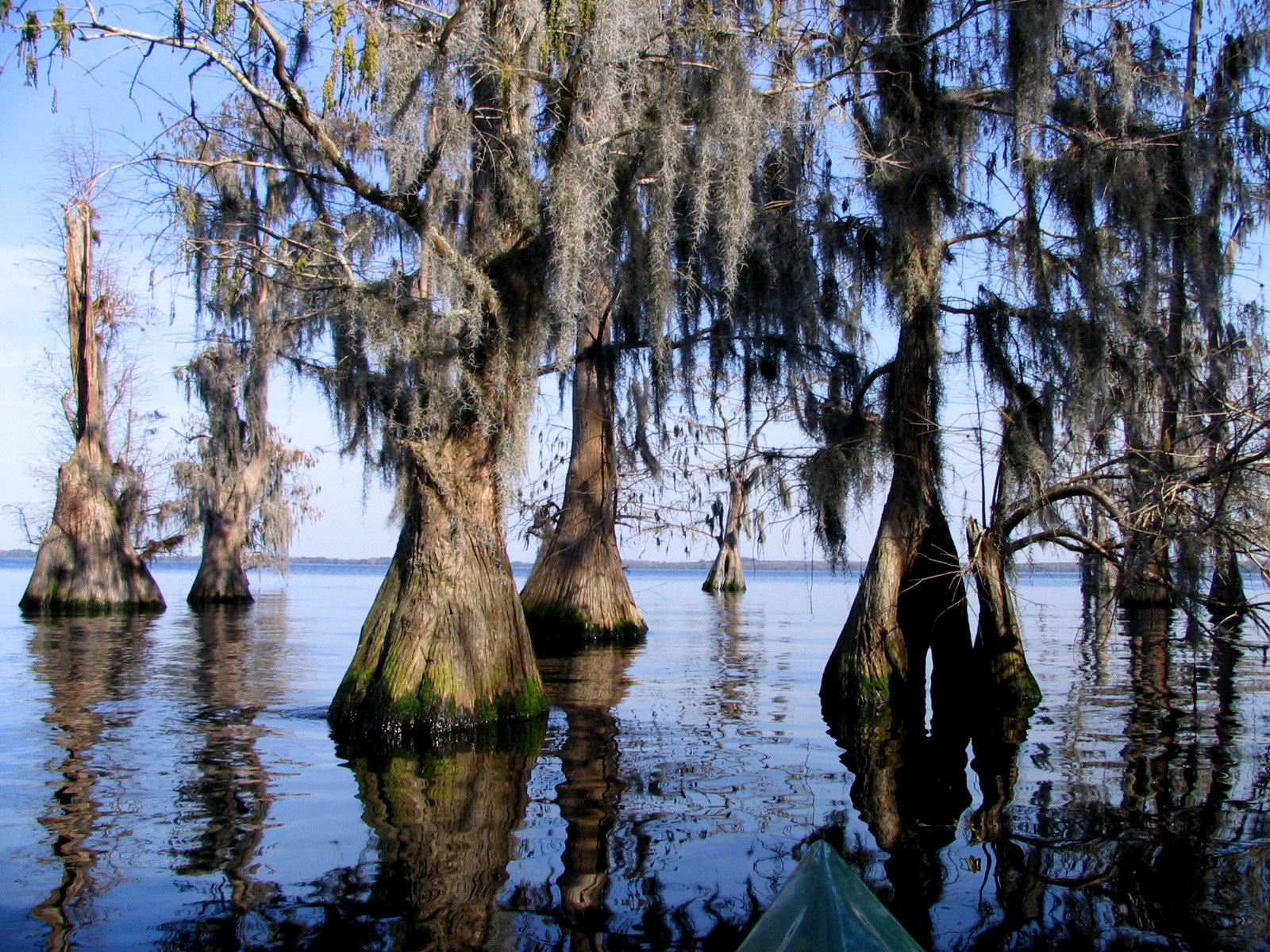
- A view from a canoe in the lake

- Location within Florida Location within the United States
- Interactive map of Lake Louisa State Park
- Location: Lake County, Florida, USA
- Nearest city: Clermont, Florida
- Coordinates: 28°28′01″N 81°45′29″W
- Area: 4,372 acres (17.69 km^{2})
- Governing body: Florida Department of Environmental Protection

Lake Louisa State Park is a 4,372-acre (17.69 km^{2}) Florida State Park located south of Clermont, in the northeast corner of the Green Swamp and the southwestern shore of Lake Louisa. It is made up of bald cypress, live oak, and saw palmettos. In addition to Lake Louisa, the park contains Hammond Lake, Dixie Lake, Dude Lake, and Bear Lake, along with several smaller lakes.

Two small streams, Big Creek and Little Creek, flow north from the Green Swamp through the park into Lake Louisa. Lake Louisa is the source of the Palatlakaha River, one of the headwaters of the Ocklawaha River.

The main entrance to the park is on U.S. 27 7 miles (11 km) south of State Road 50. An entrance on the western side of the park, off County Route 561 on Lake Nellie Road, gives access only to the horse trails.

Activities include swimming, picnicking, horseback riding, hiking, camping, fishing, and canoeing. Amenities include a canoe/kayak ramp, 16 miles (26 km) of equestrian trails, and a primitive equestrian campground, as well as a 1/2-mile (0.80 km) nature trail, 20 miles (32 km) of hiking trails, fishing pier, canoe/kayak launch, and a picnic pavilion. The park is open from 8:00 am till sundown year-round.

The property was purchased by the state in 1973 and opened to the public in 1977.

== Gallery ==
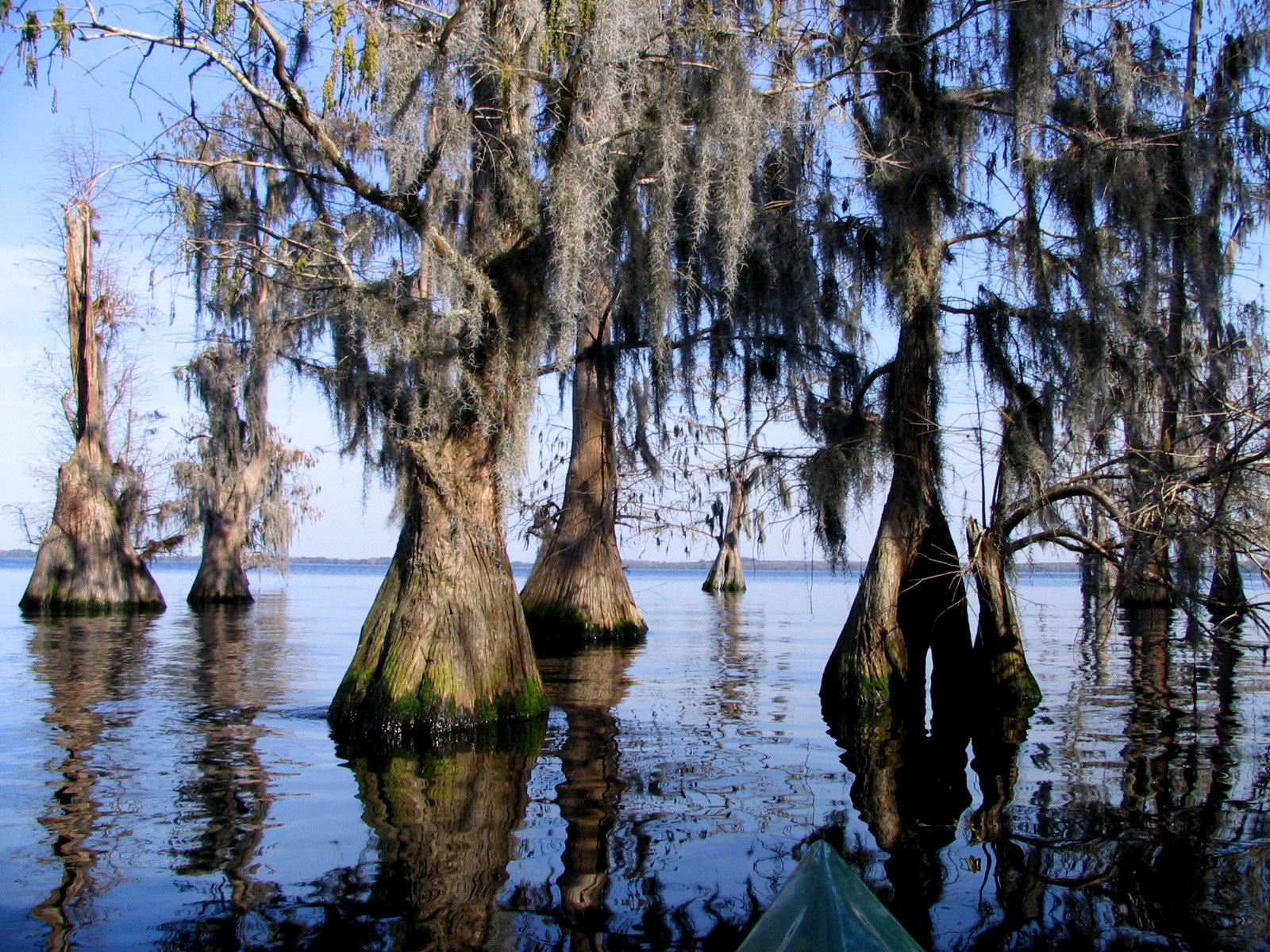
Bald Cypress in Lake Louisa

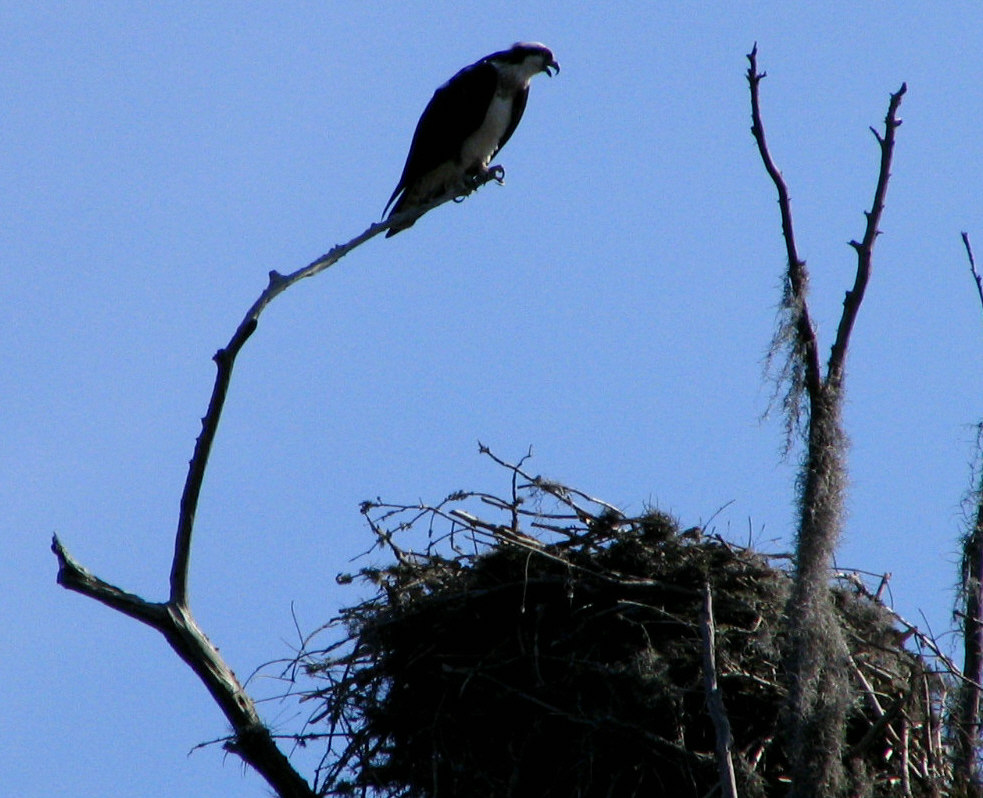
Ospreys are common in the park's lakes

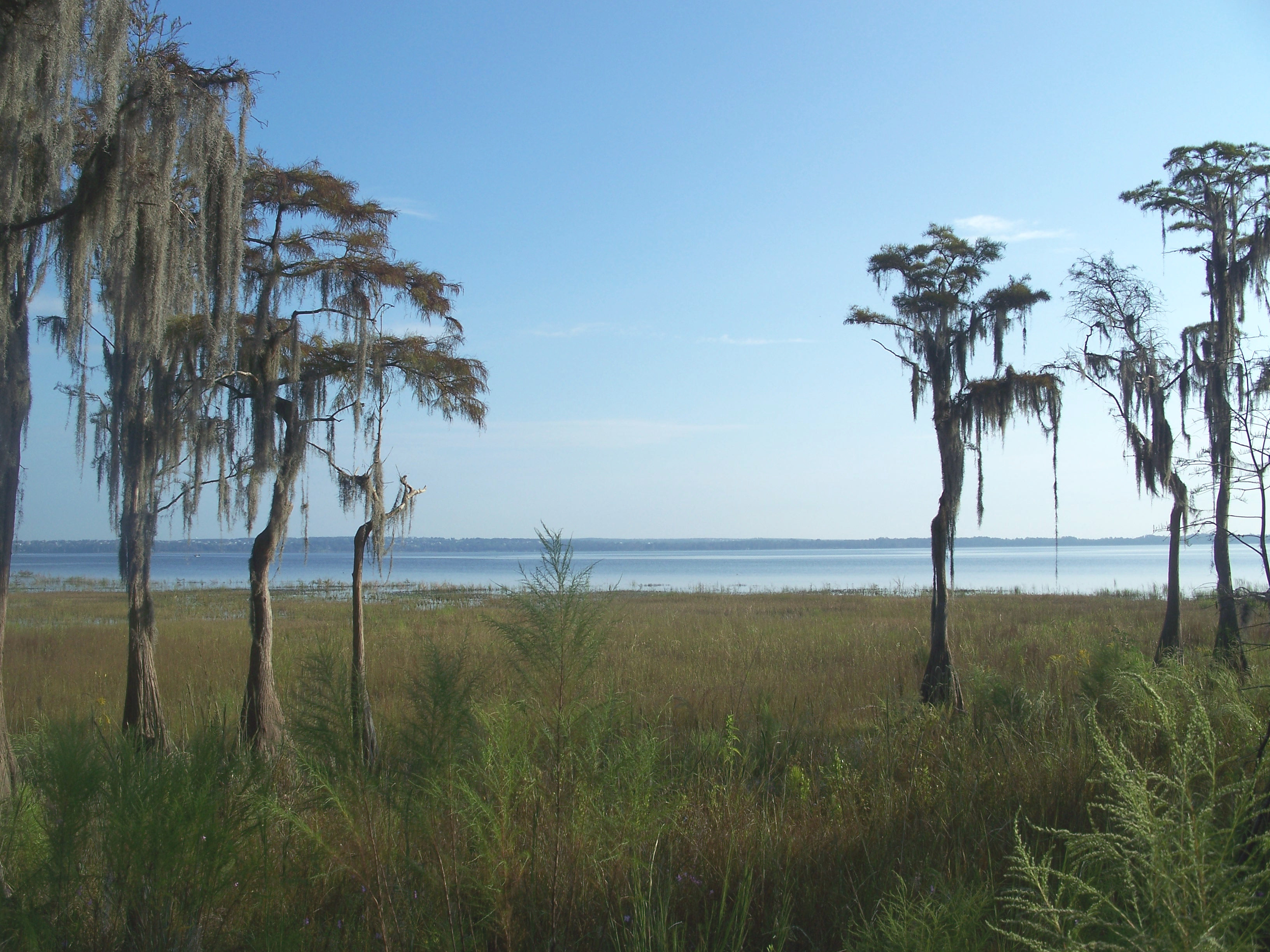
