= East Ridge High School (Florida) =

Location
- 13322 Excalibur Road; Clermont, FL
- 28.539209°N 81.714715°W

Information
- Type: Public
- Established: 2002
- Principal: Julie Robinson-Lueallen
- Teaching staff: 121.00 (FTE)
- Grades: 9-12
- Enrollment: 2,757 (2023-2024)
- Student to teacher ratio: 22.79
- Colors: Black and Gold
- Mascot: Knights
- Phone: (352) 242-2080
- Website: https://erh.lake.k12.fl.us/

East Ridge High School is a school in Clermont, Florida and one of eight public high schools in Lake County. East Ridge is the largest school in Lake County. There are 2,486 students enrolled as of December 2019.

== History ==
East Ridge High School was constructed at 13322 Excalibur Road in 2002. It is currently the second newest high school in Lake County, Florida. The school was built to stop the overcrowding of their mother, now sister school, South Lake High School, which is located in Groveland. Lake Minneola High School was opened for the fall 2011 semester.

== Notable alumni ==
- Chimdi Chekwa, NFL player
- Shane Greene, MLB player
- Andy Jones, NFL player
- Greg Lloyd Jr., NFL player
- Stephanie Samedy, volleyball player
- Kaylin Whitney, track and field athlete
