= Andy Jones (American football) =

American football player (born 1994)

No. 18, 17
- Position: Wide receiver

Personal information
- Born: June 28, 1994 (age 32); Clermont, Florida, U.S.
- Listed height: 6 ft 1 in (1.85 m)
- Listed weight: 217 lb (98 kg)

Career information
- High school: East Ridge (FL)
- College: Jacksonville
- NFL draft: 2016: undrafted

Career history
- Dallas Cowboys (2016–2017)*; Houston Texans (2017); Detroit Lions (2017–2018); Miami Dolphins (2019–2020)*; San Francisco 49ers (2021)*; New York Giants (2021)*
- * Offseason or practice squad member only

Career NFL statistics
- Games played: 11
- Receptions: 11
- Receiving yards: 80
- Receiving touchdowns: 1
- Stats at Pro Football Reference

Andy Jones (born June 28, 1994) is an American former professional football player who was a wide receiver in the National Football League (NFL). He played college football for the Jacksonville Dolphins.

== Early life ==
Jones attended East Ridge High School, where he played as a wide receiver and became a starter until his senior season.

After graduation he enrolled at Division I-AA Jacksonville University, which was a part of the non-athletic-scholarship Pioneer Football League.

Jones became a starter as a sophomore, registering 31 receptions (third on the team) for 457 yards (14.7-yard average per catch) and 2 touchdowns in 11 games (8 starts). The next year, he had 46 receptions (tied for the team lead) for 684 yards (led the team) and 7 touchdowns.

As a senior, he led the team with 60 receptions for 890 yards and 8 touchdowns. He finished his college career with 144 receptions for 2,120 yards and 17 touchdowns.

== Professional career ==
=== Dallas Cowboys ===
On May 6, 2016, Jones was signed as an undrafted free agent by the Dallas Cowboys, after a strong showing at the University of Florida's Pro Day. Taking advantage that Dez Bryant was still recuperating from previous injuries, he was able to use the extra practice time to have some notable performances in training camp. Unfortunately, he couldn't translate that production into the preseason games and was waived on September 3, 2016 and was signed to the practice squad the next day.

After spending his entire rookie season on the practice squad, Jones signed a reserve/future contract with the Cowboys on January 17, 2017. In training camp, Jones was passed on the depth chart by rookie wide receiver Noah Brown and was waived on September 2, 2017.

=== Houston Texans ===
On September 3, 2017, Jones was claimed off waivers by the Houston Texans, who had scouted him when they were forced by the aftermath of Hurricane Harvey to spend three days practicing in the Dallas Cowboys' facilities. The Texans acquired him to improve their depth, after having only four receivers on the roster and knowing that Will Fuller was going to miss 3 games while recovering from a broken collarbone. He appeared in his first NFL career game against the Jacksonville Jaguars. He was waived on September 13 and later re-signed to the active roster on September 18. He was passed on the depth chart by rookie Chris Thompson and was released on September 27, 2017.

=== Detroit Lions ===
On September 30, 2017, Jones was signed to the Detroit Lions' practice squad. He was promoted to the active roster on December 19, 2017.

On September 1, 2018, Jones was placed on the physically unable to perform (PUP) list to start the season. He was activated off PUP on November 3, 2018, but was waived two days later and re-signed to the practice squad. He was promoted to the active roster on November 17, 2018. He made his first career NFL reception on November 22 during the Thanksgiving day game against the Chicago Bears. He got his first touchdown reception on December 16 against the Bills. He appeared in 8 games with 3 starts, posting 11 receptions for 80 yards and one touchdown.

On August 31, 2019, Jones was waived/injured by the Lions and placed on injured reserve. He was waived from injured reserve with an injury settlement on September 2.

=== Miami Dolphins ===
On September 25, 2019, Jones was signed to the Miami Dolphins practice squad. He was released on November 1. On November 20, 2019, Jones was re-signed to their practice squad. He signed a futures contract with the team on December 31, 2019.

On April 18, 2020, Jones was waived by the Dolphins. Jones re-signed with the Dolphins on August 31, 2020. He was waived again on September 5, 2020.

=== San Francisco 49ers ===
On June 1, 2021, Jones signed with the San Francisco 49ers. On July 27, Jones was waived by San Francisco.

=== New York Giants ===
On August 4, 2021, Jones signed with the New York Giants, but was waived four days later.
