= Shane Greene =

American baseball player (born 1988)

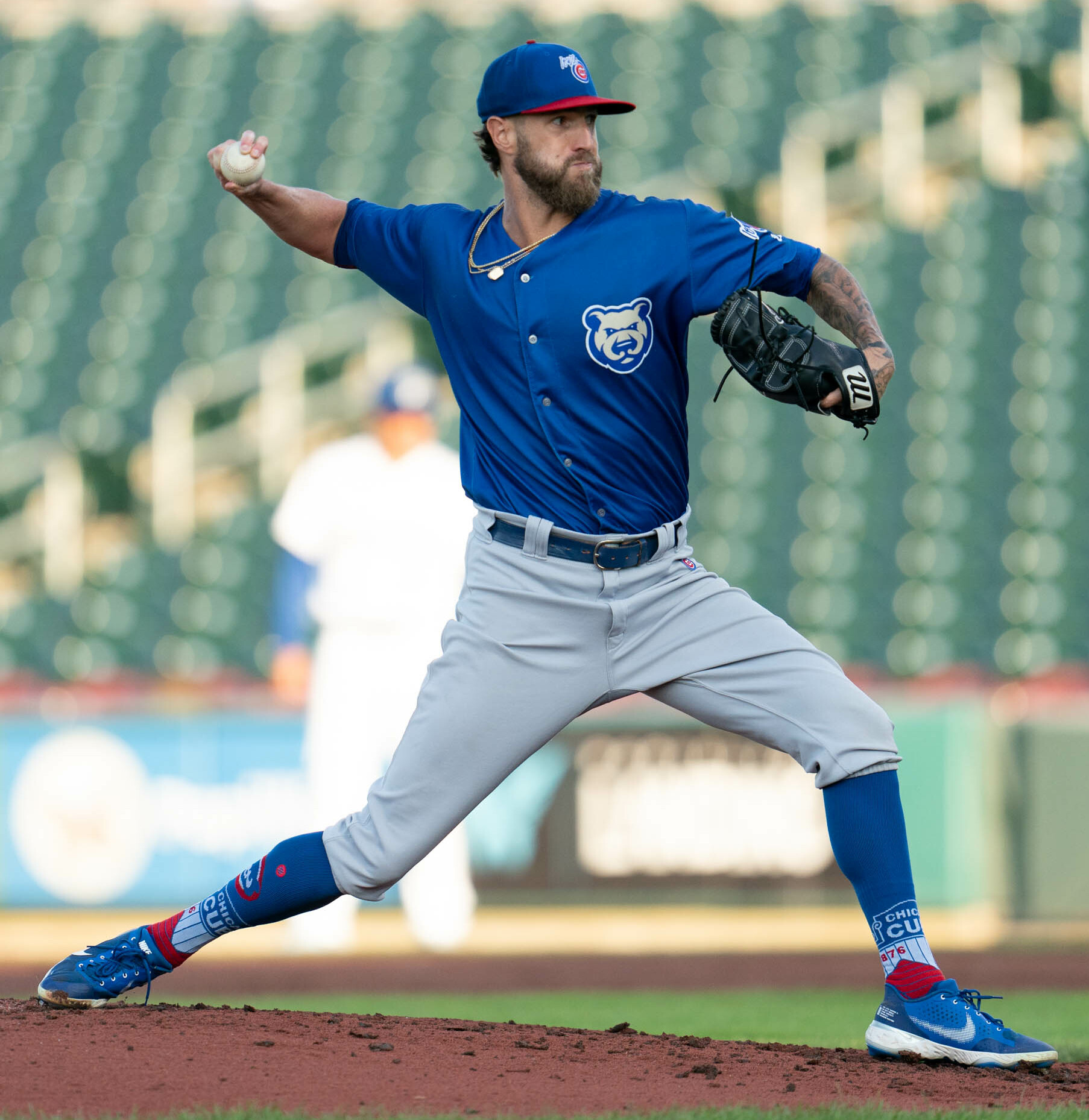
- Greene with the Iowa Cubs in 2023

Free agent
- Pitcher
- Born: November 17, 1988 (age 38); Clermont, Florida, U.S.
- Bats: Right Throws: Right

MLB debut
- April 24, 2014, for the New York Yankees

MLB statistics (through 2023 season)
- Win–loss record: 24–29
- Earned run average: 4.50
- Strikeouts: 442
- Saves: 67
- Stats at Baseball Reference

Teams
- New York Yankees (2014); Detroit Tigers (2015–2019); Atlanta Braves (2019–2021); Los Angeles Dodgers (2021–2022); New York Yankees (2022); Chicago Cubs (2023)

Career highlights and awards
- All-Star (2019)

Shane Greene (born November 17, 1988) is an American professional baseball pitcher who is a free agent. He has previously played in Major League Baseball (MLB) for the New York Yankees, Detroit Tigers, Atlanta Braves, Los Angeles Dodgers, and Chicago Cubs. The Yankees selected Greene in the 15th round of the 2009 MLB draft. After Greene made his MLB debut with the Yankees in 2014, he was traded to the Tigers before the 2015 season. Greene was an All-Star in 2019.

== Career ==
=== Amateur career ===
Greene attended East Ridge High School in Clermont, Florida, and played for their baseball team as a pitcher. He received a scholarship to attend the University of West Florida, in order to play college baseball for the West Florida Argonauts. He lost his scholarship in May 2008 when he had to undergo Tommy John surgery. He transferred to Daytona Beach Community College. While rehabilitating, the velocity of his fastball improved from 89 miles per hour (143 km/h) before the surgery to 93 to 94 miles per hour (150 to 151 km/h) after.

=== New York Yankees ===
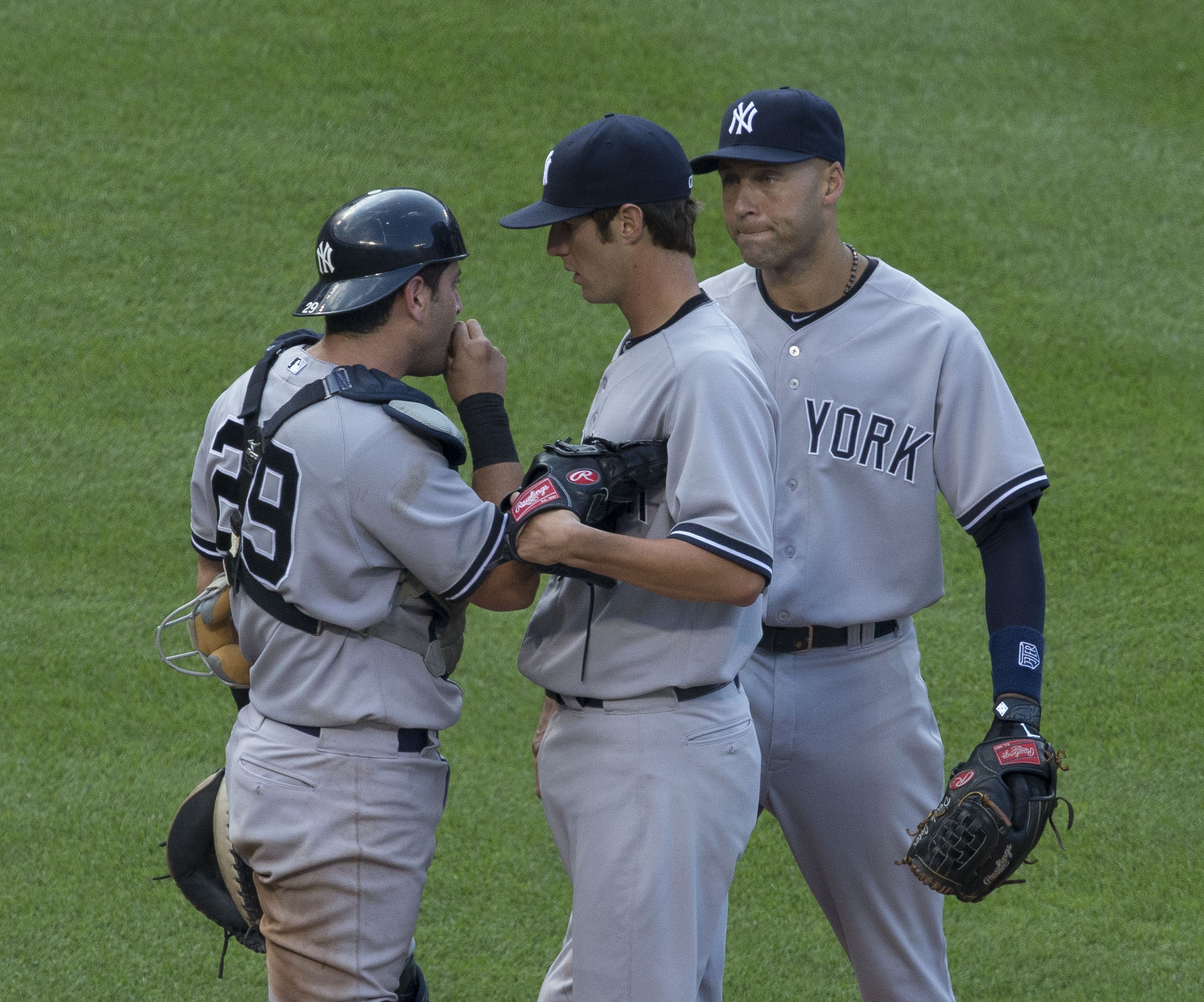
Greene (center) with the Yankees in 2014

The New York Yankees selected Greene in the 15th round of the 2009 MLB draft. He was added to the 40-man roster on November 20, 2013. He won the Kevin Lawn Award as the Yankees Minor League Pitcher of the Year for 2013.

Greene was assigned to the Scranton/Wilkes-Barre RailRiders of the Triple–A International League to start the 2014 season. He was promoted to the major leagues on April 9, 2014. He made his MLB debut against the Boston Red Sox in Fenway Park on April 24. In July, Greene replaced Vidal Nuño in the Yankees starting rotation, and he remained in the starting rotation for the remainder of the season. He ended the season with a 5–4 win–loss record and a 3.78 earned run average (ERA), while recording more than one strikeout per inning pitched.

=== Detroit Tigers (2015-2019) ===
On December 5, 2014, the Yankees traded Greene to the Detroit Tigers in a three-team transaction that brought Robbie Ray and Domingo Leyba to the Arizona Diamondbacks and Didi Gregorius to the New York Yankees.

Greene began the 2015 season in the Tigers' starting rotation, where he posted a 3–0 record, allowing only one earned run in his first three starts with an 0.39 ERA. In his next 10 starts, he posted a 1–6 record with an 8.60 ERA, allowing 16 earned runs on 21 hits over nine innings in his last three starts. On June 12, Greene was optioned to the Toledo Mud Hens of the International League, and his spot in the rotation was given to Kyle Ryan. On June 16, in his first start for the Mud Hens, Greene went 7 1/3 innings, allowing four hits, no runs, and one strikeout.

On July 27, 2015, the Tigers announced that Greene would return to working in relief. After returning to the Tigers following a stint with the Toledo Mud Hens on July 12, he gave up 17 runs on 24 hits over 13 2/3 innings. He posted a 9.20 ERA in his last 13 appearances, and did not last more than five innings in his last six starts. On August 23, 2015, Greene was diagnosed with a pseudoaneurysm in his throwing hand, and underwent season-ending surgery on August 27 to repair the circumflex artery in his throwing shoulder, ending his season with a 4–8 record and a 6.88 ERA in 18 games. Left-handed batters had a higher batting average against him, .357 (in 20 or more innings), than against all other MLB pitchers.

Greene made the Tigers' 2016 starting rotation, though he pitched out of the bullpen in the team's April 5 opening day game against the Miami Marlins and earned his first major league save. After pitching three innings of an April 24 start against the Cleveland Indians, Greene was removed from the game due to a blister on his throwing hand, and was placed on the 15-day disabled list. He returned from the DL on June 4, and was placed in the Tigers bullpen. For the 2016 season, Greene made 50 appearances (47 in relief), posting a 5–4 record and 5.82 ERA, while striking out 59 batters in 60 1/3 innings pitched.

After filling a setup role in the Tiger bullpen for the first four months of 2017, Greene was named the team's closer on July 31, following the deadline trade of incumbent closer Justin Wilson. Greene appeared in 71 games (all in relief) with a career-best 2.66 ERA and 1.24 WHIP, while striking out 73 batters in 67 2/3 innings. In limited opportunities as a closer, he recorded nine saves.

On January 17, 2018, the Tigers avoided arbitration with Greene, agreeing on a one-year, $1.95 million contract. He began the season as the Tigers' closer and recorded his first save against the Chicago White Sox on April 5, striking out the side in the bottom of the tenth to preserve a 9-7 Tigers victory. He was placed on the disabled list on July 2 with a strained right shoulder. Greene struggled after returning on July 13, posting a 6.75 ERA over the remainder of the season. His final numbers for 2018 included 32 saves in 38 opportunities, a 5.12 ERA, 1.37 WHIP, and 65 strikeouts in 63 1/3 innings.

On January 10, 2019, the Tigers avoided arbitration with Greene, agreeing on a one-year, $4 million contract. On April 7 against the Kansas City Royals, Greene became the first player in Major League history to earn seven saves in his team's first 10 games since saves became an official statistic in 1969. On April 10, he extended his saves record to eight saves in his team's first 12 games. Greene finished April with 12 saves, 17 strikeouts, three walks and a 1.29 ERA in 14 appearances, and won American League Reliever of the Month honors.

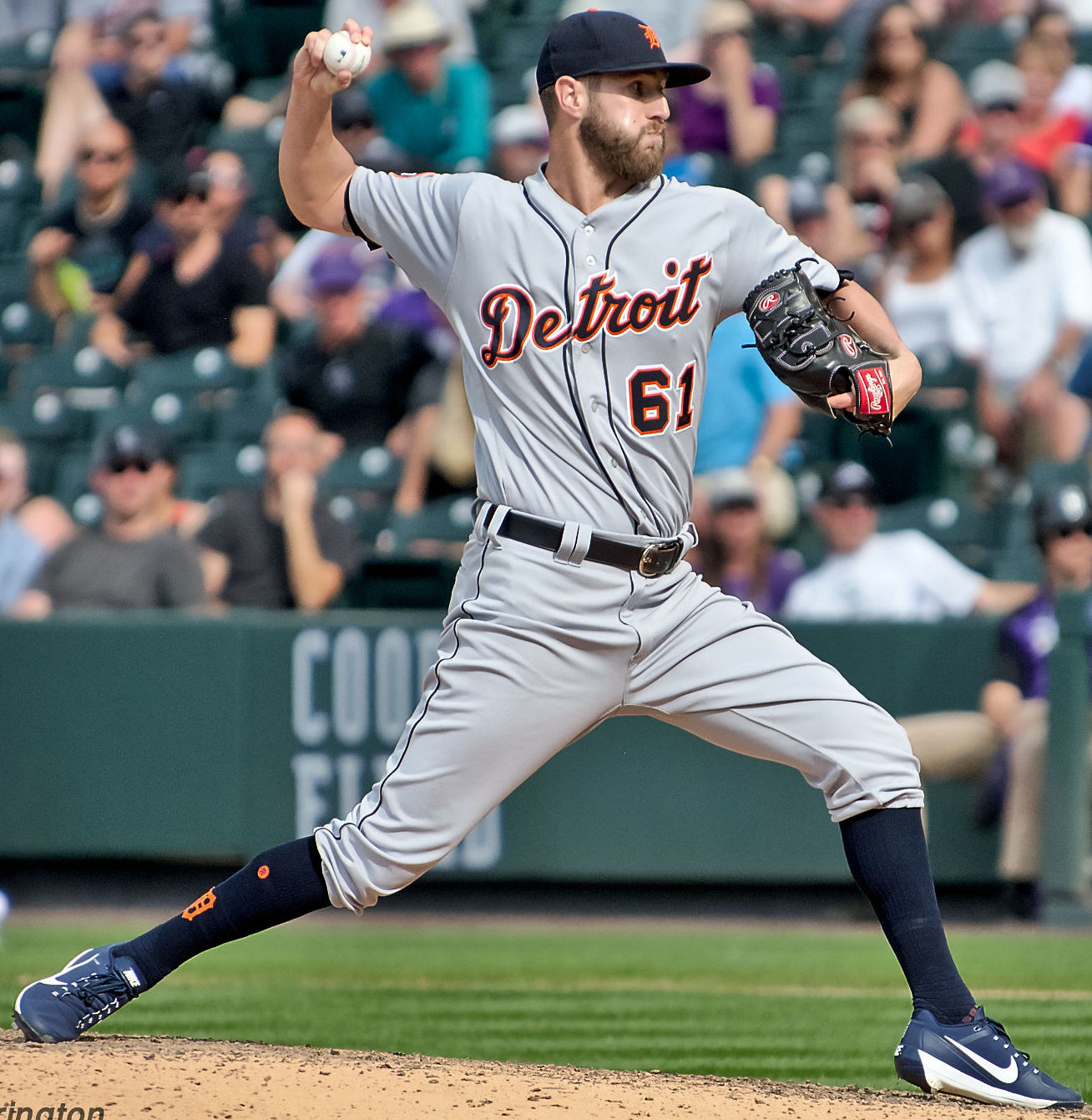
Greene pitching for the Detroit Tigers

On June 30, Greene was named as the Tigers' sole representative for the All-Star Game in Cleveland, his first career All-Star selection. At the time of the selection, Greene had earned 22 saves in 23 save opportunities, while posting a 0.87 ERA, 0.839 WHIP, and holding opposing hitters to a .152 average. In the All-Star Game, Greene earned a hold by pitching a clean seventh inning, retiring all three batters he faced.

=== Atlanta Braves (2019-2021) ===
On July 31, 2019, the Tigers traded Greene to the Atlanta Braves in exchange for Joey Wentz and Travis Demeritte. Greene was acquired by the Braves to fill a closer role that had previously been held by Arodys Vizcaíno, A. J. Minter and Luke Jackson. Due to initial struggles by Greene, Braves manager Brian Snitker removed him from the closer's role on August 9 and promoted Mark Melancon to that position. Greene's combined 2019 stats included an 0-3 record, 23 saves, a 2.30 ERA, and 64 strikeouts in 62 2/3 innings.

Greene's 2020 season salary was decided via arbitration. He was awarded a salary of $6.25 million, instead of his request of $6.75 million. In 2020, he had a 1-0 win–loss record with a 2.60 ERA in 26 games (27 2/3 innings). He became a free agent after the season.

On May 9, 2021, Greene re-signed with the Braves on a one-year, $1.5 million contract, and was assigned to the Triple-A Gwinnett Stripers to get back into game shape. Over 19 innings for the Braves in 2021, Greene struggled to an 8.47 ERA. On August 10, 2021, Greene was designated for assignment by the Braves, and released on August 14.

=== Los Angeles Dodgers ===
Greene signed a major league deal with the Los Angeles Dodgers on August 20, 2021. He pitched 6 2/3 innings over nine games for the Dodgers and allowed three runs on three hits and five walks before he was designated for assignment on September 22. Greene was released by the Dodgers on September 26.

On October 23, 2021, Greene debuted with Cardenales de Lara in the Venezuelan Professional Baseball League (LVBP).

On March 16, 2022, Greene signed a one year minor league deal to stay with the Dodgers organization and was added back to the 40-man roster on May 15. He pitched two scoreless innings in one game before he was designated for assignment again on May 17.

=== New York Yankees (second stint) ===
On May 25, 2022, the New York Yankees signed Greene to a minor league contract. They assigned him to Scranton/Wilkes-Barre RailRiders, and promoted him to the major leagues on July 23. He was designated for assignment on July 24 and elected free agency on July 27. On July 29, Greene signed a minor league contract with the Yankees. He elected free agency following the season on November 10.

=== Chicago Cubs ===
On June 27, 2023, Greene signed a minor league contract with the Chicago Cubs organization and was assigned to the rookie–level Arizona Complex League Cubs. In 5 starts for the Triple–A Iowa Cubs, he logged a 2.16 ERA with 20 strikeouts in 16 2/3 innings pitched. On September 1, Greene was selected to the major league roster. He made one appearance for Chicago, tossing a scoreless inning against the Cincinnati Reds. On September 6, Greene was designated for assignment following the promotion of Luke Little. He cleared waivers and was sent outright to Triple–A Iowa on September 9. On October 1, Greene had his contract selected back to the major league roster. He became a free agent following the season.

=== Texas Rangers ===
On January 10, 2024, Greene signed a minor league contract with the Texas Rangers. He made six appearances (including one start) for the Triple–A Round Rock Express, but struggled to an 0–1 record and 16.88 ERA with 11 strikeouts over eight innings pitched. Greene elected free agency following the season on November 4.

After joining the Gigantes del Cibao of the Dominican Professional Baseball League in November 2025, Greene temporarily joined the Diablos Rojos del México during the 2026 Baseball Champions League Americas.

=== Diablos Rojos del México ===
On April 16, 2026, Greene signed with the Diablos Rojos del México of the Mexican League. He made two appearances (one start) for the Diablos, but struggled to a 22.09 ERA with one strikeout across 3 2/3 innings pitched. Greene was released by México on April 29.

== Pitch selection ==
Greene throws a four-seam fastball and a sinking two-seam fastball that each average 93–96 mph (topping out at 98 mph). His primary offspeed pitch is a slider in the 87–90 mph range, and he also throws a curveball in the low 80s.
