= Palatlakaha River =

River in Florida, United States

Coordinates: 28°46′00″N 81°52′15″W

The Palatlakaha River is a river in Lake County, Florida. It forms the principal headwater of the Ocklawaha River, a tributary of St. Johns River. The source of the Palatlakaha River is at Lake Louisa, itself fed from the Green Swamp by two streams known as Big Creek and Little Creek.

From Lake Louisa the river flows north through a chain of lakes known as the Clermont Chain of lakes, which are 17 in total. In order the major lakes are Lake Susan, Lake Minnehaha, Lake Palatlakaha, Lake Hiawatha, Lake Minneola, Cherry Lake, Lake Lucy and Lake Emma. From Lake Emma the river flows through a swampy area to enter Lake Harris.

The river is 30.9 miles (49.7 km) long. The upper section of the river forms the 26.22-mile-long (42.20 km) Palatlakaha Run, a waterways trail for canoeists and kayakers organized by Lake County. There are six water level control dams on the river that are closed to keep water levels higher during drier periods.
