= Scott McLean (American football) =

American football player (born 1960)

No. 52
- Position: Linebacker

Personal information
- Born: December 16, 1960 (age 65); Clermont, Florida, U.S.
- Listed height: 6 ft 4 in (1.93 m)
- Listed weight: 231 lb (105 kg)

Career information
- High school: Clermont (FL)
- College: Florida State
- NFL draft: 1982: undrafted

Career history
- Dallas Cowboys (1982–1983)
- Stats at Pro Football Reference

Robert Scott McLean (born December 16, 1960) is an American former professional football player who was a linebacker in the National Football League (NFL) for the Dallas Cowboys. He played college football for the Florida State Seminoles.

== Early life ==
McLean attended Clermont High School, before moving on to Florida State University. In his first two years he played defensive tackle, before being moved to defensive end as a junior.

He also practiced track and field, competing in the discus throw.

== Professional career ==
McLean was signed as an undrafted free agent by the Dallas Cowboys after the 1982 NFL draft and converted him into a linebacker. As a rookie, he injured his knee in training camp and was placed on the injured reserve list.

In 1983, he made the team as a backup middle linebacker and played the position of "left back" for four games.
