= Kevin Thomas (cornerback, born 1986) =

American gridiron football player (born 1986)

No. 21
- Position: Cornerback

Personal information
- Born: September 20, 1986 (age 40); St. Louis, Missouri, U.S.
- Listed height: 6 ft 0 in (1.83 m)
- Listed weight: 192 lb (87 kg)

Career information
- High school: Rio Mesa (Oxnard, California)
- College: USC
- NFL draft: 2010: 3rd round, 94th overall pick

Career history
- Indianapolis Colts (2010−2011); Philadelphia Eagles (2012)*; Toronto Argonauts (2014)*
- * Offseason or practice squad member only

Awards and highlights
- Second-team All-Pac-10 (2009)

Career NFL statistics
- Total tackles: 33
- Pass deflections: 3
- Stats at Pro Football Reference

Kevin Thomas (born September 20, 1986) is an American former professional football player who was a cornerback in the National Football League (NFL). He was selected by the Indianapolis Colts in the third round of the 2010 NFL draft. He played college football for the USC Trojans.

== Early life ==
Thomas's prep career included being named a Super Prep All-American, Prep Star All-American, Rivals 100, Tacoma News Tribune Western 100, All-CIF Southern Section first-team, All-CIF Division IV and Los Angeles Times All-Ventura/North Coast pick as a senior defensive back and wide receiver. During his senior year at Rio Mesa High School he recorded 81 tackles and 5 interceptions on defense and 27 receptions for 430 yards with 5 touchdowns on offense.

== College career ==
In his freshman year in 2005, Thomas played in 9 games as a reserve cornerback and on special teams. In his sophomore season in 2006, Thomas was injured but played in 4 games. In his junior season in 2007, Thomas was injured and redshirted. In his redshirt junior year in 2008, Thomas played in all 13 games. In his redshirt senior year in 2009, Thomas started all 13 games and was named Second-team All-Pac-10.

== Professional career ==
=== Indianapolis Colts ===
Thomas was selected in the third round by the Indianapolis Colts with the 94th pick in the 2010 NFL draft. Missed the entire 2010 season due to a knee injury.

=== Philadelphia Eagles ===
On August 2, 2012, Thomas was traded to the Philadelphia Eagles along with a conditional 2013 seventh round draft pick for linebackers Moise Fokou and Greg Lloyd, Jr.

=== Toronto Argonauts ===
On April 4, 2014, he signed with the Toronto Argonauts along with his former USC teammate, Kyle Moore. He was released by the Argonauts on June 2, 2014.
