= Moise Fokou =

Cameroonian gridiron football player (born 1985)

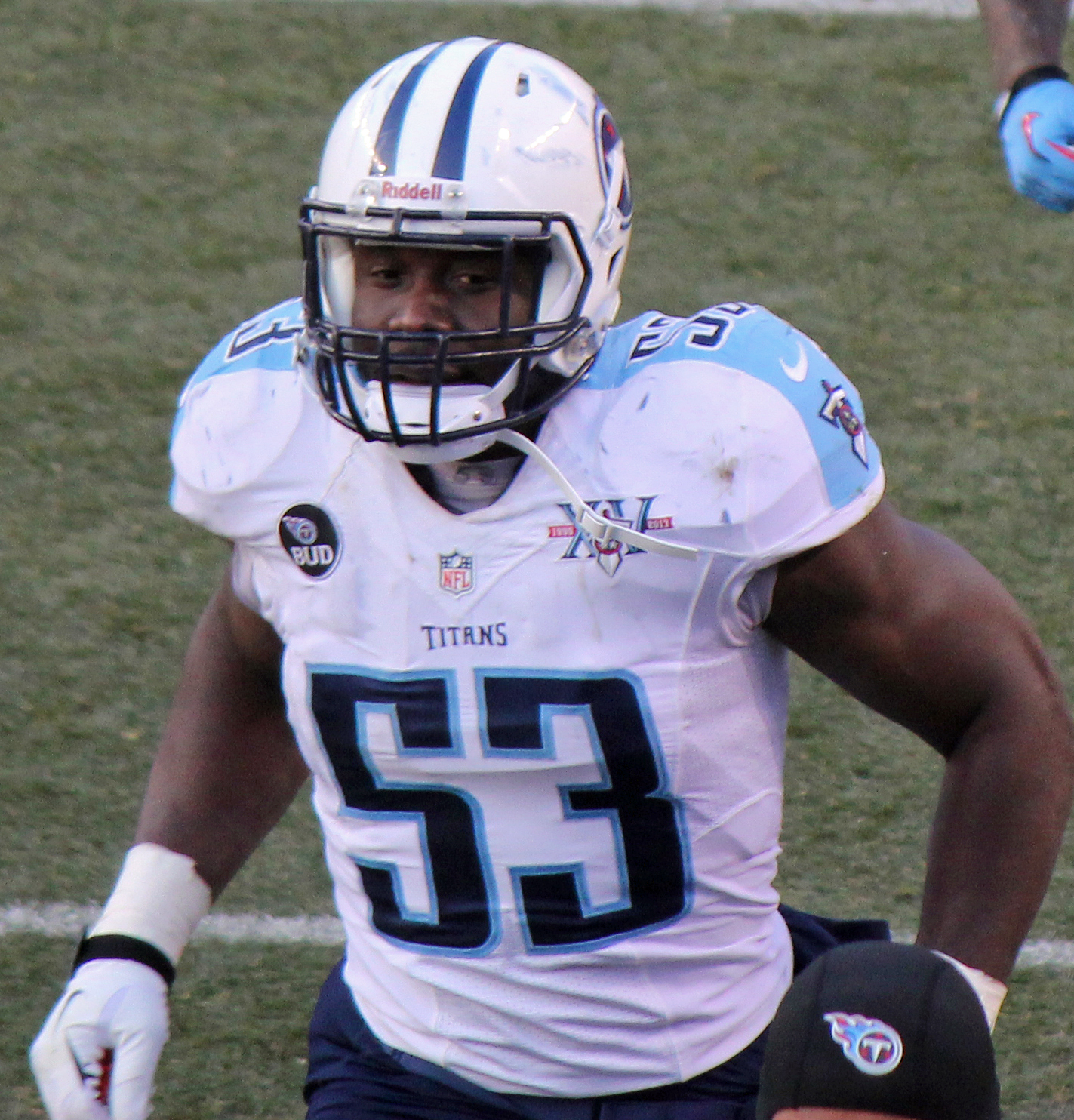
- Fokou with the Tennessee Titans in 2013

No. 53, 58, 52
- Position: Linebacker

Personal information
- Born: August 28, 1986 (age 40); Douala, Cameroon
- Listed height: 6 ft 1 in (1.85 m)
- Listed weight: 243 lb (110 kg)

Career information
- High school: Potomac (Potomac, Maryland, U.S.)
- College: Maryland
- NFL draft: 2009: 7th round, 230th overall pick

Career history
- Philadelphia Eagles (2009–2011); Indianapolis Colts (2012); Tennessee Titans (2013); New Orleans Saints (2014); Cleveland Browns (2015)*
- * Offseason or practice squad member only

Career NFL statistics
- Total tackles: 235
- Sacks: 3.0
- Forced fumbles: 4
- Fumble recoveries: 3
- Stats at Pro Football Reference

Moise Fokou (/ˈmoʊzɪs/ "Moses"; born August 28, 1985) is a Cameroonian-American former professional football linebacker who played six seasons in the National Football League (NFL). He was selected by the Philadelphia Eagles in the seventh round of the 2009 NFL draft. He played college football at Maryland and Frostburg State.

Fokou was also a member of the Indianapolis Colts, Tennessee Titans, New Orleans Saints, and Cleveland Browns.

== Early life ==
Fokou was born in Cameroon to parents Jean-Marie and Louise Takougne. In 1990, his parents moved to Rockville, Maryland. His brother, Achille Kolla, played as a defensive back for Catholic University. Fokou attended Westland Middle School in Bethesda, Maryland, the Bethesda-Chevy Chase High School in Bethesda, Maryland and Bullis School in Potomac, Maryland, where he played football as a running back and linebacker. There, during his senior year in 2003, he was named an All-IAC and Washington Post second-team All-Met player. He was also named the conference most valuable player. In 2008, Fokou took the citizenship test after three years on the waiting list.

== College career ==
In 2004, Fokou attended Frostburg State University. On the football team, he saw action in all ten games and recorded the second-most tackles on the team with 70. He had 5.5 tackles for loss, 1.5 sacks, and blocked two kicks.

In 2005, Fokou transferred to the University of Maryland, where he was required by NCAA rules to sit out for one season. He was twice named the scout team defensive player of the week prior to the games against Virginia and Boston College. In 2006, he played in all 13 games as a reserve "Will" linebacker behind Erin Henderson and in a role on special teams. He recorded 21 tackles and tied for fifth in the Atlantic Coast Conference (ACC) in forced fumbles with 0.18 per game. In 2007, Fokou started all 13 games at the "Sam" linebacker position. He ranked third on the team with 84 tackles including 7.0 for loss. Fokou also forced one fumble and recorded one interception.

In 2008, he saw action in all 13 games, including 12 starts, as a Sam linebacker. He recorded 77 total tackles, including 41 solo and 12.0 for loss, five sacks, two passes broken up, and one quarterback hurry. Fokou led the team in sacks and ranked fifth in total tackles. He accounted for the most sacks by a Maryland linebacker since Shawne Merriman in 2004.

Fokou played in the 2009 Under Armour Senior Bowl as a member of the South squad.

== Professional career ==
=== Pre-draft ===
He also participated in the 2009 NFL Combine. The NFL Draft Scout assessed him as the 30th-ranked outside linebacker prospects for the 2009 NFL draft.

Pre-draft measurables
Height	Weight	Arm length	Hand span	40-yard dash	10-yard split	20-yard split	20-yard shuttle	Three-cone drill	Vertical jump	Broad jump	Bench press
6 ft 1 1/8 in (1.86 m)	233 lb (106 kg)	33 3/4 in (0.86 m)	10 1/4 in (0.26 m)	4.76 s	1.71 s	2.81 s	4.28 s	7.09 s	33.0 in (0.84 m)	10 ft 1 in (3.07 m)	21 reps
All values from NFL Combine/Pro Day

=== Philadelphia Eagles ===
Fokou was selected in the seventh round by the Philadelphia Eagles as the 230th overall pick in the 2009 NFL draft. He played all 16 games and won the starting strong-side linebacker job for the final four games. He ended the season with 39 tackles.

After starting for most of the season at strong-side linebacker in 2011, Fokou was placed on injured reserve on November 29 due to a sprained ankle suffered during a week 12 loss to the New England Patriots.

=== Indianapolis Colts ===
On August 2, 2012, Fokou and Greg Lloyd were traded to the Indianapolis Colts for Kevin Thomas and a conditional seventh round pick in the 2013 NFL draft.

=== Tennessee Titans ===
Fokou signed with the Tennessee Titans on March 13, 2013. He was released on August 30, 2014.

=== New Orleans Saints ===
On November 18, 2014, Fokou was signed by the New Orleans Saints.

=== Cleveland Browns ===
On August 10, 2015, Fokou was signed by the Cleveland Browns. On August 31, 2015, he was released by the Browns.

== NFL career statistics ==
Legend
**Bold**	Career high

=== Regular season ===
Year	Team	Games		Tackles					Interceptions					Fumbles			
Year	Team	GP	GS	Cmb	Solo	Ast	Sck	TFL	Int	Yds	TD	Lng	PD	FF	FR	Yds	TD
2009	PHI	**16**	4	39	27	12	0.0	0	0	0	0	0	1	0	**2**	0	0
2010	PHI	**16**	11	51	44	7	**1.0**	**3**	0	0	0	0	1	1	0	0	0
2011	PHI	11	7	22	14	8	0.0	2	0	0	0	0	**2**	0	0	0	0
2012	IND	**16**	1	43	31	12	**1.0**	2	0	0	0	0	**2**	1	0	0	0
2013	TEN	12	**12**	**78**	**62**	**16**	**1.0**	2	0	0	0	0	0	**2**	1	0	0
2014	NOR	2	0	2	1	1	0.0	0	0	0	0	0	0	0	0	0	0
		73	35	235	179	56	3.0	9	0	0	0	0	6	4	3	0	0

=== Playoffs ===
Year	Team	Games		Tackles					Interceptions					Fumbles			
Year	Team	GP	GS	Cmb	Solo	Ast	Sck	TFL	Int	Yds	TD	Lng	PD	FF	FR	Yds	TD
2009	PHI	**1**	**1**	**5**	**3**	**2**	0.0	0	0	0	0	0	**1**	0	0	0	0
2010	PHI	**1**	**1**	3	**3**	0	0.0	**1**	0	0	0	0	0	0	0	0	0
2012	IND	**1**	0	2	2	0	0.0	0	0	0	0	0	**1**	0	0	0	0
		3	2	10	8	2	0.0	1	0	0	0	0	2	0	0	0	0
