= Greg Lloyd Jr. =

American football player (born 1989)

Greg Lloyd, Jr.
No. 59
- Position: Linebacker

Personal information
- Born: February 10, 1989 (age 37); Fayetteville, Georgia, U.S.
- Listed height: 6 ft 1 in (1.85 m)
- Listed weight: 247 lb (112 kg)

Career information
- High school: East Ridge (Clermont, Florida)
- College: Connecticut
- NFL draft: 2011: 7th round, 237th overall pick

Career history
- Philadelphia Eagles (2011); Indianapolis Colts (2012)*; Buffalo Bills (2012)
- * Offseason or practice squad member only

Awards and highlights
- Second-team All-Big East (2009)
- Stats at Pro Football Reference

Gregory Lenard Lloyd II (born February 10, 1989) is an American former professional football player who was a linebacker in the National Football League (NFL). He was selected by the Philadelphia Eagles in the seventh round of the 2011 NFL draft. He played college football for the Connecticut Huskies.

Lloyd is the son of former Pittsburgh Steelers linebacker Greg Lloyd Sr.

== Professional career ==
Pre-draft measurables
Height	Weight	Arm length	Hand span	Wingspan	40-yard dash	10-yard split	20-yard split	20-yard shuttle	Three-cone drill	Vertical jump	Broad jump	Bench press
6 ft 1 1/8 in (1.86 m)	246 lb (112 kg)	33 1/2 in (0.85 m)	10 1/8 in (0.26 m)	6 ft 7 in (2.01 m)	4.89 s	1.71 s	2.83 s	4.46 s	7.17 s	32.0 in (0.81 m)	9 ft 1 in (2.77 m)	22 reps
All values from NFL Combine

=== Philadelphia Eagles ===
Lloyd was selected by the Philadelphia Eagles in the seventh round of the 2011 NFL draft. After getting released during final roster cuts on September 3, 2011, he was re-signed to the team's practice squad on September 4. He was promoted to the active roster on November 29.

=== Indianapolis Colts ===
The Eagles traded Lloyd and Moise Fokou to the Indianapolis Colts on August 2, 2012, in exchange for Kevin Thomas and a conditional seventh round draft pick in 2013. He was waived by the Colts during final cuts on August 31, 2012.

=== Buffalo Bills ===
Lloyd was signed to the Buffalo Bills practice squad on November 21, 2012. He was signed to the active roster on December 30, 2012. He was released on June 5, 2013.
