= Chimdi Chekwa =

American football player (born 1988)

No. 35, 38
- Position: Cornerback

Personal information
- Born: October 7, 1988 (age 38); Marrero, Louisiana, U.S.
- Listed height: 6 ft 0 in (1.83 m)
- Listed weight: 190 lb (86 kg)

Career information
- High school: East Ridge (Clermont, Florida)
- College: Ohio State
- NFL draft: 2011: 4th round, 113th overall pick

Career history
- Oakland Raiders (2011–2014); New England Patriots (2015)*; Oakland Raiders (2015); Miami Dolphins (2016)
- * Offseason or practice squad member only

Awards and highlights
- First-team All-American (2010); First-team All-Big Ten (2010)

Career NFL statistics
- Total tackles: 53
- Forced fumbles: 1
- Fumble recoveries: 1
- Pass deflections: 4
- Stats at Pro Football Reference

Chimdi Chekwa (born October 7, 1988) is an American former professional football player who was a cornerback in the National Football League (NFL). He played college football for the Ohio State Buckeyes. He was selected by the Oakland Raiders in the fourth round of the 2011 NFL draft.

== College career ==
As a senior in 2010, Chekwa was named a first-team All-American by the FWAA and College Football News.

== Professional career ==
Pre-draft measurables
Height	Weight	Arm length	Hand span	Wingspan	40-yard dash	10-yard split	20-yard split	Vertical jump	Broad jump
5 ft 11 3/4 in (1.82 m)	191 lb (87 kg)	31 3/8 in (0.80 m)	8 3/8 in (0.21 m)	6 ft 2 7/8 in (1.90 m)	4.38 s	1.52 s	2.56 s	34.5 in (0.88 m)	10 ft 6 in (3.20 m)
All values from NFL Combine

=== Oakland Raiders (first stint) ===
Chekwa was selected by the Oakland Raiders in the fourth round, 113th overall, in the 2011 NFL draft.

=== New England Patriots ===
Checkwa was signed by the New England Patriots on March 12, 2015. He was released by the team on May 18, 2015.

=== Oakland Raiders (second stint) ===
Chekwa re-signed with the Raiders on May 19, 2015.

=== Miami Dolphins ===
Chekwa signed with the Dolphins. On September 3, 2016, he was released as part of final roster cuts. He was re-signed by the Dolphins on October 11, 2016. He was released by the Dolphins on November 7, 2016.

== Personal life ==
In 2016, Chekwa earned a Master of Business Administration degree from the University of Miami Business School.
