= Clermont, Florida =

City in Florida, United States

- City
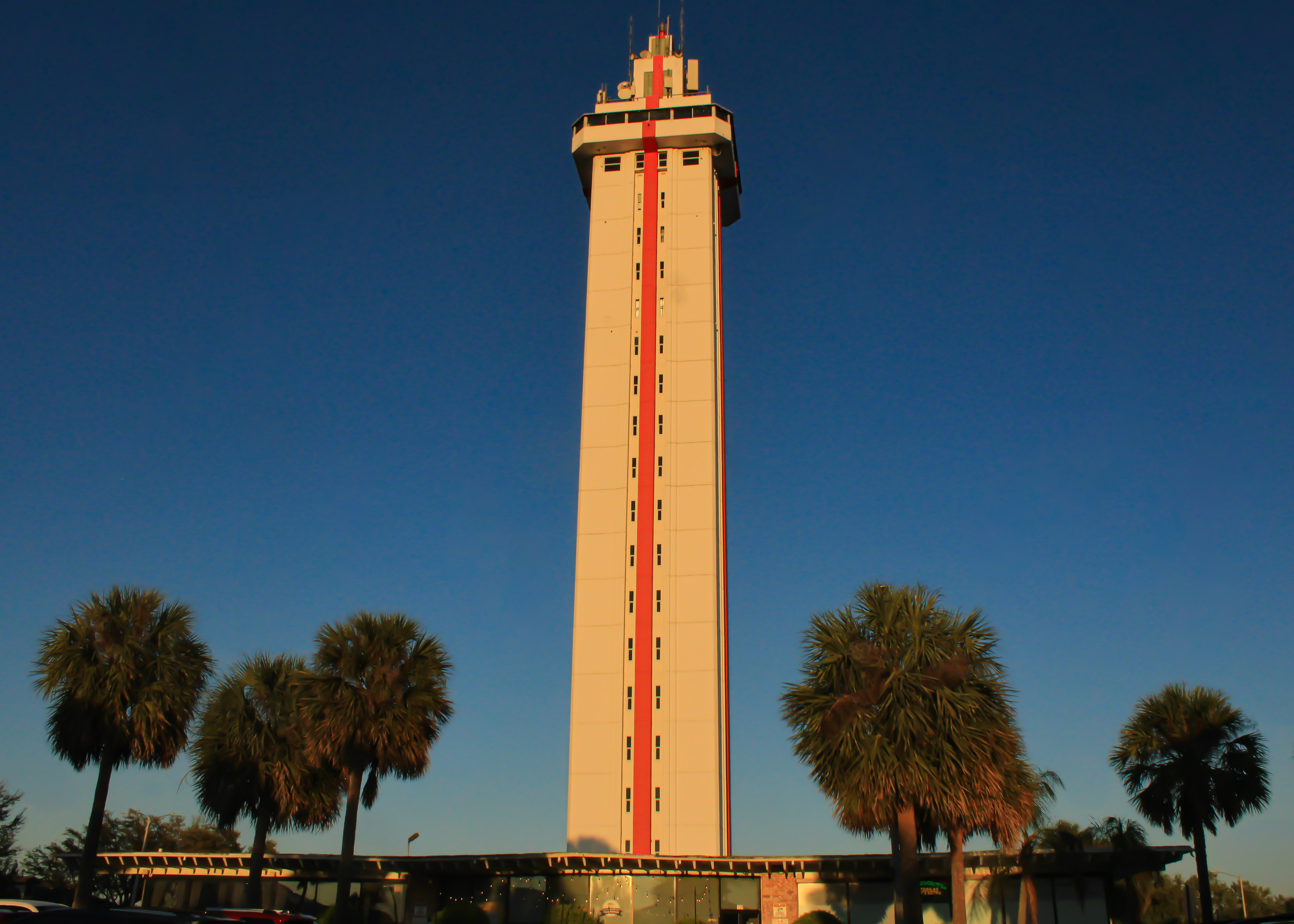
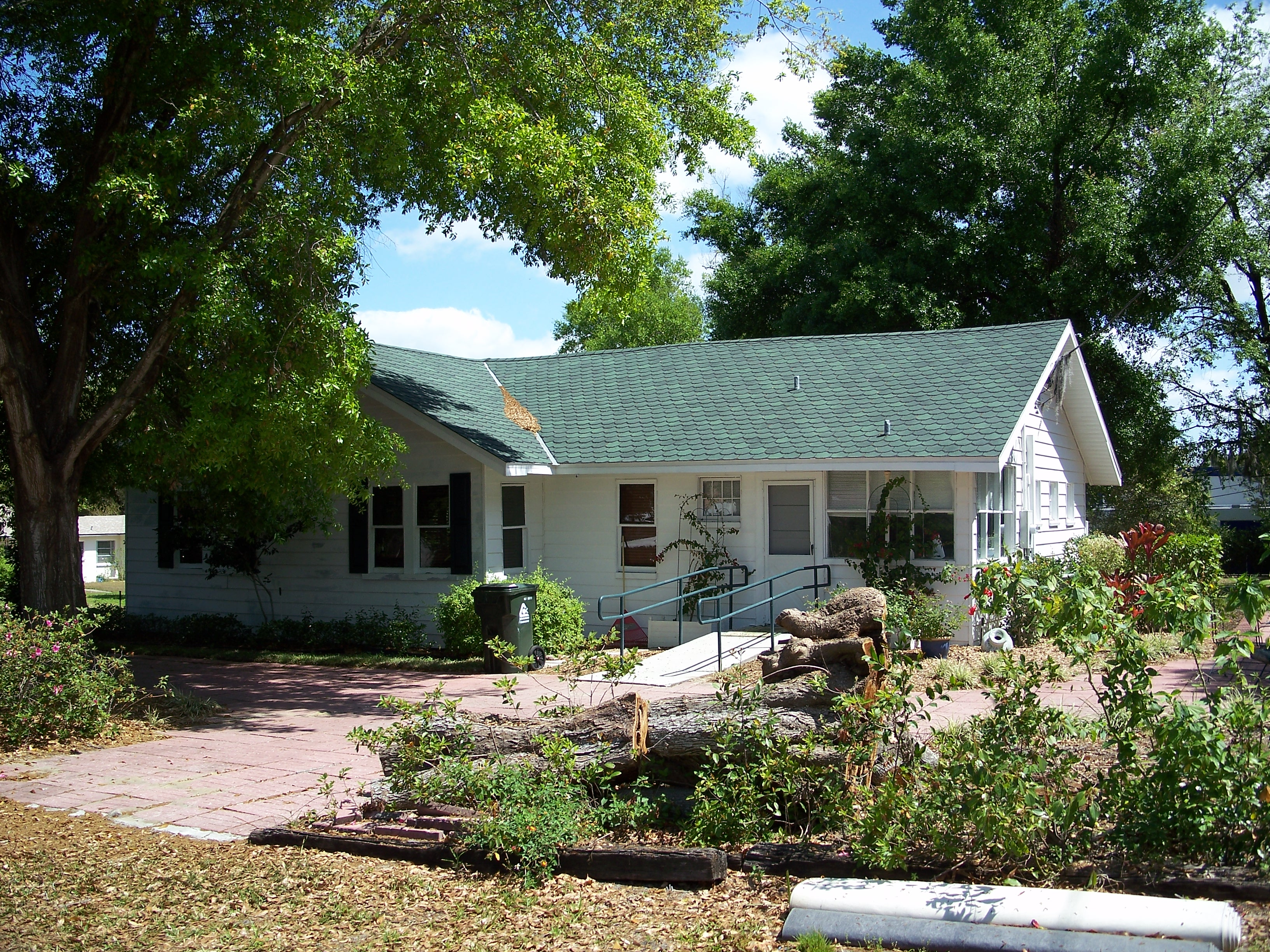
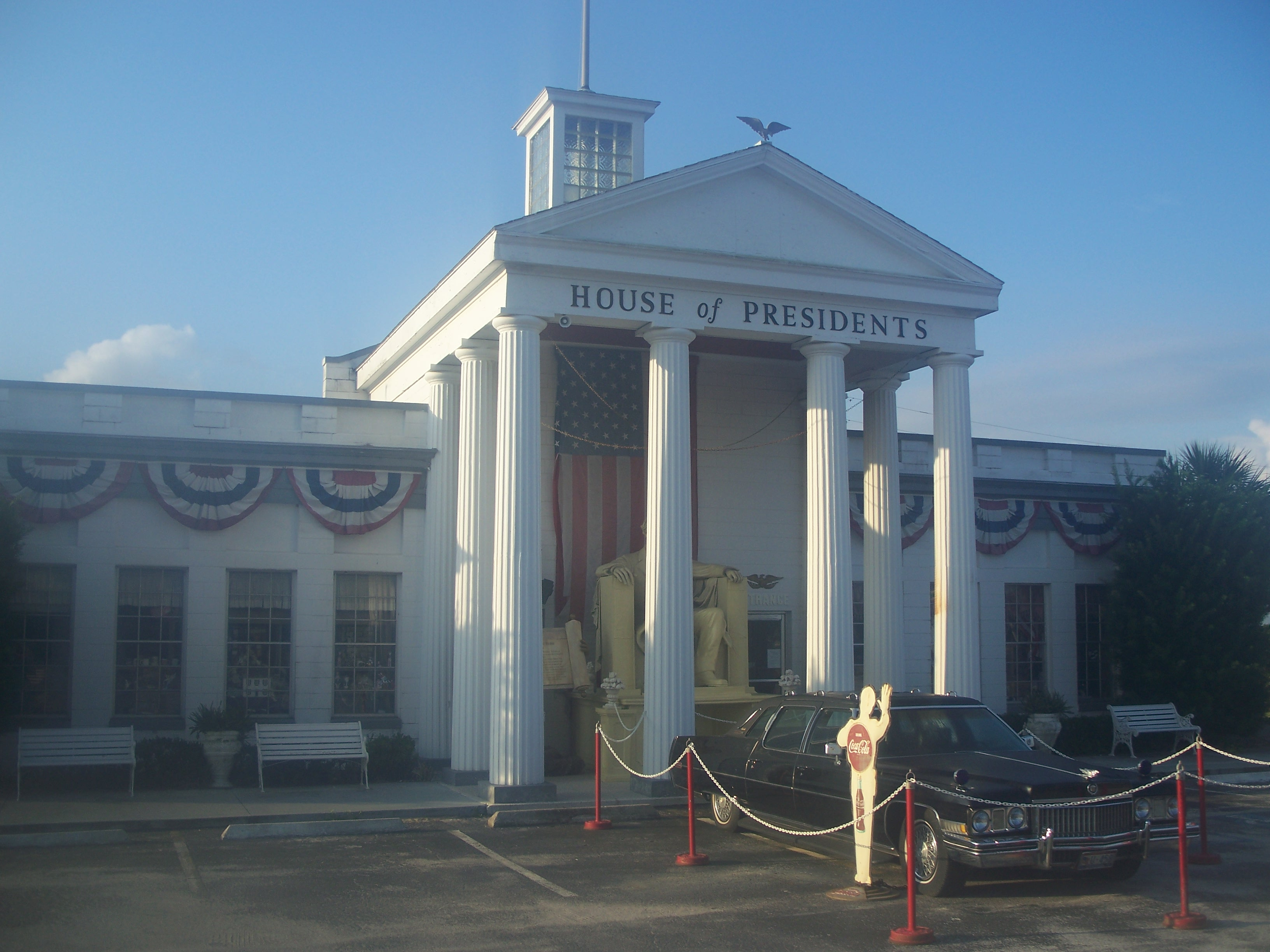
- Florida Citrus Tower Clermont Woman's Club White House replica at the Presidents Hall of Fame

- Flag Logo
- Motto(s): "Choice of Champions" "The Gem of the Hills"
- Location in Lake County and the state of Florida
- Coordinates: 28°31′50″N 81°44′53″W
- Country: United States
- State: Florida
- County: Lake
- Founded: 1884
- Incorporated (town): June 9, 1891-May 25, 1895
- Reincorporated (city): December 28, 1916

Government
  - Type: Council-Manager

Area
  - Total: 19.15 sq mi (49.61 km^{2})
  - Land: 18.07 sq mi (46.79 km^{2})
  - Water: 1.09 sq mi (2.82 km^{2})
- Elevation: 125 ft (38 m)

Population (2020)
  - Total: 43,021
  - Estimate (2025): 52,812
  - Density: 2,381.4/sq mi (919.45/km^{2})
- Time zone: UTC-5 (Eastern (EST))
  - Summer (DST): UTC-4 (EDT)
- ZIP codes: 34711-34715
- Area code: 352
- FIPS code: 12-12925
- GNIS feature ID: 2404069
- Website: www.clermontfl.gov

Clermont is the most populous city in Lake County, within the U.S. state of Florida. The population was 43,021 in 2020. It is about 22 miles (35 km) west of Orlando and 22 miles (35 km) southeast of Leesburg. The city is largely residential in character and its economy is centered in retail trade, lodging, and tourism-oriented restaurants and bars. It is part of the Orlando–Kissimmee–Sanford Metropolitan Statistical Area.

Clermont is home to the 1956 Florida Citrus Tower, one of Florida's early landmarks.

== History ==
Before European colonization and settlement, the area which is today Clermont was originally inhabited by the indigenous Timucua people. Urriparacoxi was reportedly a chieftain in the area during the 1539-40 Hernando de Soto expeditions. The population of the Timucua were whittled by epidemics of infectious diseases introduced by Europeans, then by attacks and slave raids largely conducted under Spanish colonial rule.

After the collapse of Timucua society, the indigenous Seminole people came to inhabit the region. In 1819, Florida was acquired by the United States from Spain with the Adams–Onís Treaty. Four years later, the area of modern-day Clermont became a part of an Indian reservation under the Treaty of Moultrie Creek. The Seminole were ultimately ethnically cleansed by federal troops in the Seminole Wars or driven out on the Trail of Tears. The region was geographically called the High Sand Hills by Americans, according to maps by Washington Hood. The first white settlers arrived in the area in 1853, soon after the Seminole Wars.

Clermont was founded in 1884, and named for the French birthplace of A.F. Wrotnowski, manager of the Clermont Improvement Company, a company to develop land. The municipality was incorporated as a town from June 9, 1891, then disbanded on May 25, 1895. It was reincorporated as a city on December 28, 1916.

Much of the county was developed as orange and other citrus groves, which was the basis of the economy through the mid-20th century. Apshawa Groves, which owned and worked large expanses of land in the county, became a major real estate company. Tourism also became increasingly important.

The groves, which were the namesake of the Citrus Tower, dwindled rapidly because of recurrent freezes and suburban development in the late 20th century and into the 2000s. The regional economy shifted from agricultural production to real estate. The population growth attracted numerous companies to the area.

From 2000 to 2020, the population grew more than 250 percent amid real estate development and urban sprawl in Central Florida. This brought economic growth and big-box retail stores. Clermont was described as one of the fastest-growing cities in Central Florida of the time. In spring 2010, the Clermont Landings shopping center opened with 20 shops and restaurants and the city's first cinema. Increased pollution from runoff and residential development has hurt the city's lakes and other natural resources.

Since 2001, when Orlando Health, with Pure Athletics and USA Triathlon, opened the National Training Center in Clermont, the city has been noted for its training facilities for Olympic and college athletes. The Center later added a nearby facility for Special Olympics Florida. In 2014, the city sought to market itself as a training center by adopting the slogan "Choice of Champions" and a flag with Olympic rings. Twenty athletes who trained in Clermont went to the 2016 Rio Olympics; others went to the 2024 Paris Olympics.

== Geography ==
According to the United States Census Bureau, the city has a total area of 11.5 square miles (30 km^{2}), of which 10.5 square miles (27 km^{2}) is land and 1.0 square mile (2.6 km^{2}) (8.54%) is water.

The Clermont area lies on the northern part of the Lake Wales Ridge. There are rolling hills atypical of the Florida peninsula. Nearby are the Clermont chain of lakes and Lake Apopka.

=== Climate ===
The climate in this area is characterized by hot, humid summers and generally mild winters. According to the Köppen climate classification, the City of Clermont has a humid subtropical climate zone (Cfa).

Climate data for Clermont, Florida, 1991–2020 normals, extremes 1892–present
Month	Jan	Feb	Mar	Apr	May	Jun	Jul	Aug	Sep	Oct	Nov	Dec	Year
Record high °F (°C)	89 (32)	93 (34)	97 (36)	99 (37)	100 (38)	102 (39)	105 (41)	102 (39)	99 (37)	99 (37)	94 (34)	90 (32)	105 (41)
Mean maximum °F (°C)	83.4 (28.6)	84.9 (29.4)	87.9 (31.1)	91.2 (32.9)	94.7 (34.8)	96.2 (35.7)	96.6 (35.9)	96.1 (35.6)	94.5 (34.7)	91.5 (33.1)	87.2 (30.7)	83.9 (28.8)	97.6 (36.4)
Mean daily maximum °F (°C)	72.4 (22.4)	75.3 (24.1)	79.4 (26.3)	85.0 (29.4)	89.8 (32.1)	92.2 (33.4)	93.6 (34.2)	93.2 (34.0)	91.1 (32.8)	86.1 (30.1)	79.4 (26.3)	74.5 (23.6)	84.3 (29.1)
Daily mean °F (°C)	60.7 (15.9)	63.4 (17.4)	67.5 (19.7)	73.0 (22.8)	78.3 (25.7)	82.3 (27.9)	83.8 (28.8)	83.8 (28.8)	82.1 (27.8)	76.5 (24.7)	68.8 (20.4)	63.5 (17.5)	73.6 (23.1)
Mean daily minimum °F (°C)	49.0 (9.4)	51.5 (10.8)	55.5 (13.1)	61.0 (16.1)	66.7 (19.3)	72.3 (22.4)	74.0 (23.3)	74.4 (23.6)	73.2 (22.9)	66.9 (19.4)	58.2 (14.6)	52.6 (11.4)	63.0 (17.2)
Mean minimum °F (°C)	31.6 (−0.2)	34.7 (1.5)	40.6 (4.8)	46.3 (7.9)	56.9 (13.8)	65.7 (18.7)	69.1 (20.6)	69.4 (20.8)	66.3 (19.1)	52.3 (11.3)	42.5 (5.8)	36.2 (2.3)	29.7 (−1.3)
Record low °F (°C)	18 (−8)	17 (−8)	25 (−4)	37 (3)	47 (8)	51 (11)	62 (17)	62 (17)	56 (13)	38 (3)	28 (−2)	19 (−7)	17 (−8)
Average precipitation inches (mm)	2.84 (72)	2.29 (58)	3.20 (81)	2.59 (66)	3.54 (90)	7.95 (202)	7.44 (189)	8.09 (205)	5.39 (137)	2.71 (69)	1.81 (46)	2.79 (71)	50.64 (1,286)
Average precipitation days (≥ 0.01 in)	7.2	6.3	6.7	5.6	7.0	14.6	15.9	17.1	12.1	7.5	5.2	6.5	111.7
Source: NOAA

== Demographics ==
Historical population
Census	Pop.	Note	%±
1920	496		—
1930	1,086		119.0%
1940	1,631		50.2%
1950	2,168		32.9%
1960	3,313		52.8%
1970	3,661		10.5%
1980	5,461		49.2%
1990	6,910		26.5%
2000	9,333		35.1%
2010	28,742		208.0%
2020	43,021		49.7%
2025 (est.)	52,812		22.8%
U.S. Decennial Census

=== Racial and ethnic composition ===
Clermont racial composition (Hispanics excluded from racial categories) (NH = Non-Hispanic)
Race	Pop 2010	Pop 2020	% 2010	% 2020
White (NH)	17,377	23,598	60.46%	54.85%
Black or African American (NH)	3,852	5,250	13.40%	12.20%
Native American or Alaska Native (NH)	87	105	0.30%	0.24%
Asian (NH)	1,185	1,913	4.12%	4.45%
Pacific Islander or Native Hawaiian (NH)	18	35	0.06%	0.08%
Some other race (NH)	360	787	1.25%	1.83%
Two or more races/Multiracial (NH)	761	2,006	2.65%	4.66%
Hispanic or Latino (any race)	5,102	9,327	17.75%	21.68%
Total	28,742	43,021		

=== 2020 census ===
As of the 2020 census, Clermont had a population of 43,021. The median age was 45.5 years. 19.4% of residents were under the age of 18 and 25.8% of residents were 65 years of age or older. For every 100 females there were 89.3 males, and for every 100 females age 18 and over there were 86.5 males age 18 and over.

100.0% of residents lived in urban areas, while 0.0% lived in rural areas.

There were 17,114 households in Clermont, of which 28.2% had children under the age of 18 living in them. Of all households, 52.5% were married-couple households, 14.6% were households with a male householder and no spouse or partner present, and 27.2% were households with a female householder and no spouse or partner present. About 24.8% of all households were made up of individuals and 13.2% had someone living alone who was 65 years of age or older. There were 9,179 families residing in the city.

There were 18,612 housing units, of which 8.0% were vacant. The homeowner vacancy rate was 1.6% and the rental vacancy rate was 10.1%.

Racial composition as of the 2020 census
Race	Number	Percent
White	25,865	60.1%
Black or African American	5,512	12.8%
American Indian and Alaska Native	140	0.3%
Asian	1,941	4.5%
Native Hawaiian and Other Pacific Islander	38	0.1%
Some other race	3,562	8.3%
Two or more races	5,963	13.9%
Hispanic or Latino (of any race)	9,327	21.7%

=== 2010 census ===
As of the 2010 United States census, there were 28,742 people, 10,072 households, and 7,377 families residing in the city.

In 2010, the income per capita is $24,952, which includes all adults and children. The median household income is $45,980.

The median home value in town is $227,510. Home appreciation was –21.40% during 2009. Renters made up 23.21% of the population. 8.33% of houses and apartments were unoccupied (vacancy rate).

=== 2000 census ===
As of the census of 2000, there were 9,333 people, 3,995 households, and 2,736 families residing in the city. The population density was 343.5 people/km^{2} (890 people/mi^{2}). There were 4,368 housing units at an average density of 160.8 units/km^{2} (416 units/mi^{2}). The racial makeup of the city was 83.50% White, 12.08% African American, 0.48% Native American, 0.89% Asian, 0.01% Pacific Islander, 1.55% from other races, and 1.49% from two or more races. Hispanic or Latino of any race were 5.71% of the population.

In 2000, there were 3,995 households out of which 22.8% had children under the age of 18 living with them, 55.1% were married couples living together, 10.3% had a female householder with no husband present, and 31.5% were non-families. 26.3% of all households were made up of individuals and 12.5% had someone living alone who was 65 years of age or older. The average household size was 2.29 and the average family size was 2.73.

In 2000, in the city the population was spread out with 20.1% under the age of 18, 6.3% from 18 to 24, 24.0% from 25 to 44, 24.7% from 45 to 64, and 24.8% who were 65 years of age or older. The median age was 45 years. For every 100 females there were 89.9 males. For every 100 females age 18 and over, there were 85.5 males.

In 2000, the median income for a household in the city was $39,290, and the median income for a family was $48,216. Males had a median income of $36,240 versus $26,571 for females. The per capita income for the city was $21,099. About 6.3% of families and 7.8% of the population were below the poverty line, including 15.0% of those under age 18 and 4.5% of those age 65 or over.

== Education ==
The public school district for the City of Clermont is Lake County Schools.

=== Public elementary schools ===
- Cypress Ridge Elementary School
- Lost Lake Elementary School
- Pine Ridge Elementary
- Sawgrass Bay Elementary School

=== Public middle schools ===
- East Ridge Middle School
- Windy Hill Middle School

=== Public K-8 schools ===
- Aurelia M. Cole Academy (former site of Clermont Middle School and Clermont High School)

=== Public high schools ===
- East Ridge High School

=== Charter school ===
- Imagine South Lake Charter School
- Pinecrest Lakes Academy

=== Private schools ===
- Real Life Christian Academy
- The Key to Learning
- Wesley Christian Academy
- Family Christian Center School
- Citrus Heights Academy

=== Specialty schools ===
- Lincoln Park Education Center (formerly Clermont Elementary School)

=== Higher education ===
Lake-Sumter State College and the University of Central Florida have a joint-use campus in Clermont. The Lincoln Park Education Center offers courses from Lake-Sumter State College and Lake Technical College for students.

=== Public library ===
The Cooper Memorial Library in Clermont is staffed by the Lake-Sumter State College and the Lake County Library System.

A salesman wandered into town in 1904, and spoke promises of donating books to start a library if the town helped him sell his Chautauqua lectures to residents. Many town members with money to spare put forth what they could, excited at the prospect of a library. However, when it came time for the lectures only a few of the speakers showed; no salesman or books were present. Not all money was handed over; the cost for the last lecture was still available, and with that amount they began to organize their own library. This was hosted in the Montrose Street home of Mrs. Payson Pierce, with the collection of books open to the town on Saturday afternoons. Patrons paid 50 cents a year. The Clermont Library Club also hosted their meetings at Pierce's house. The growing collection was moved to Isiah Benson's Lake Avenue house in 1910, then to the Baptist Church the following year.

In the summer of 1914, the Friends of the Library raised $600 to erect a one-room building on 630 DeSoto Street, a lot donated by Alice Cooper. The library was funded by the club and its small circulating collection staffed by Clermont Women's Club volunteers until the city took over in the 1950s and the Cooper Memorial Library Association was formed to administer the public library. In 1980, a former bank building was purchased. A human chain of town volunteers passed the books, hand to hand, from the old to the new location. Mike Delaney, a Friends of the Library member, said, "It was an amazing honor to be part of the early book brigade when I was seven...It was an experience that I will never forget that brought the community together". In 1984, the building was expanded by more than 4,000 square feet, adding the Florida Room and Children's Room. In 1982, the Cooper Memorial Library joined the Lake County Library System, and is the only continuous member of that system.

== Places of interest ==
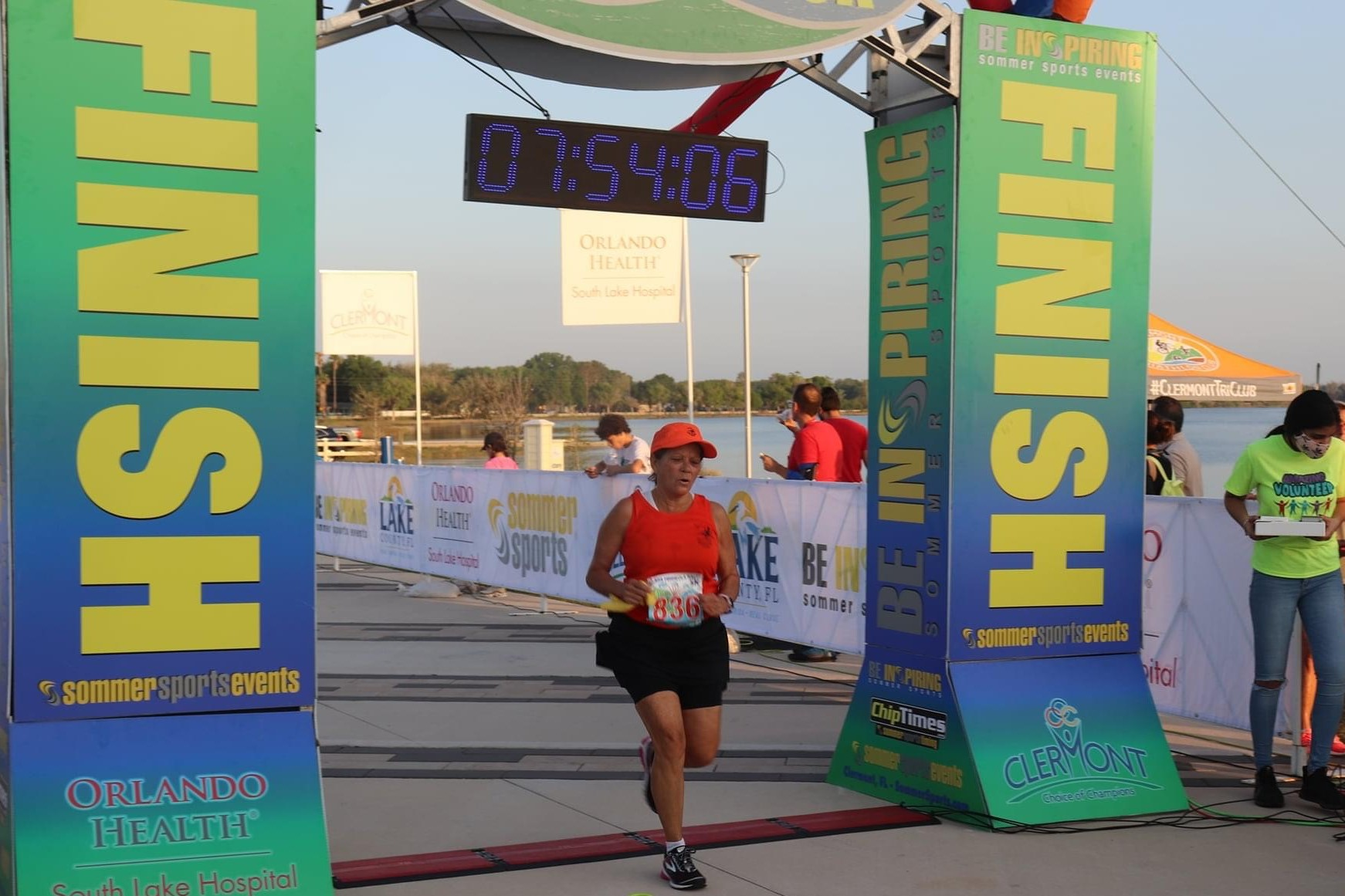
Woman crosses finish line of a 5K run in Clermont's Victory Pointe Park.

Downtown Clermont has restaurants, shops, the local Art League, Clermont City Center, and City Hall.

The downtown's western area, known as Historic Village, includes sites such as the Townsend House, home to James and Sallie Townsend, the first African-American couple in Clermont. The building known as "Little Cooper" was moved to the Clermont Historic Village in 2009, and restored to be opened as a museum of local and world history. The Historic Village is maintained by the South Lake County Historical Society and the City of Clermont.

South Lake Hospital is the regional hospital of south Lake County.

The United States Triathlon National Training Center used to be located in Clermont. Duathlons, triathlons and cross country races are held at the facility.

Waterfront Park is located along Lake Minneola, The park includes picnic areas, a swimming area, fishing piers and a playground. There are rentals of paddle boards, kayaks and bicycles. A fitness trail that is part of a 40-mile system runs through the park.

== Transportation ==
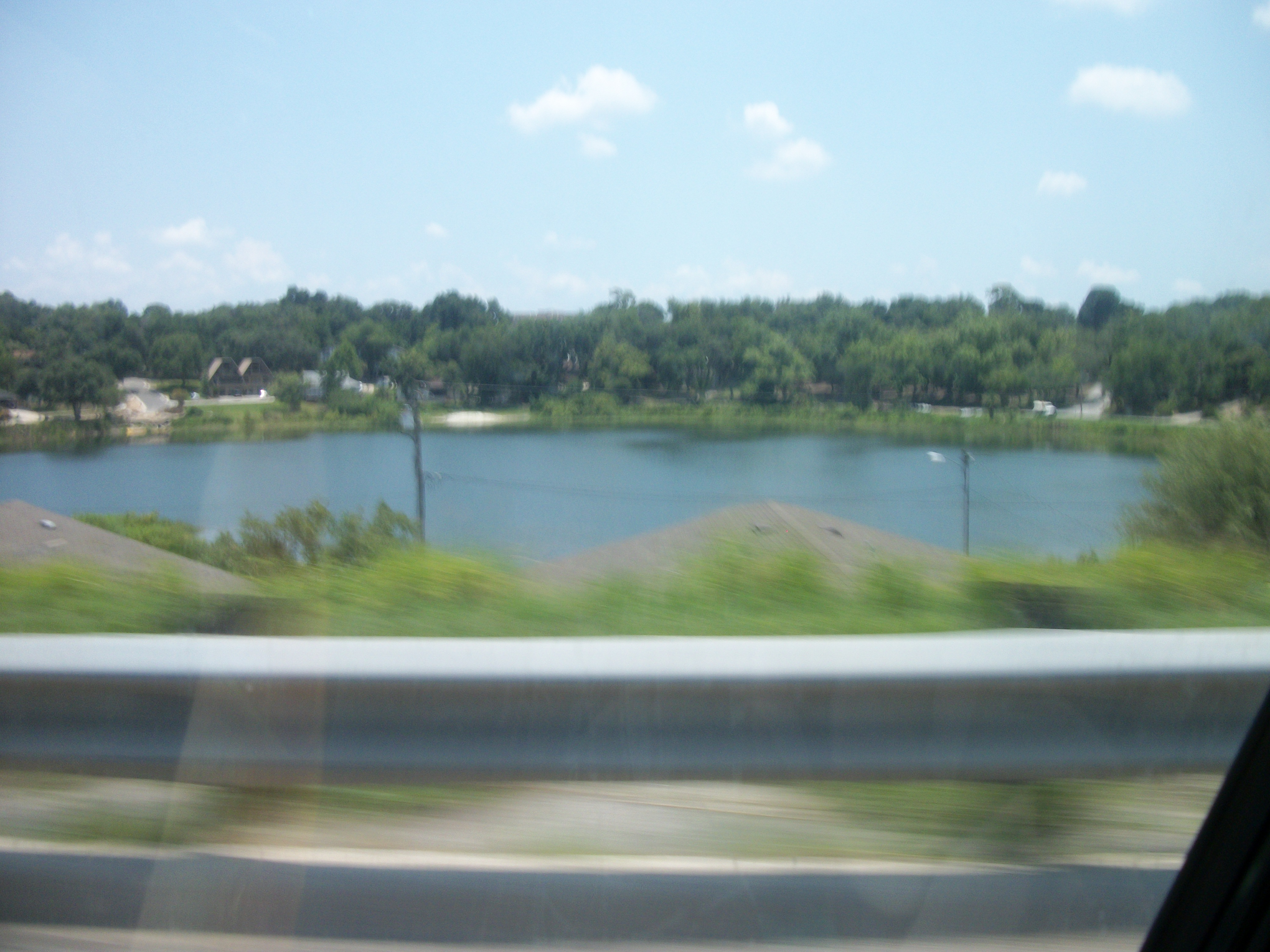
Lake Sunnyside as seen from high above eastbound SR 50, one of many lakes in Clermont.

The main roads through Clermont consist of State Road 50 and U.S. Route 27.

Additionally, the public transit of LakeXpress serves routes along State Road 50 and South on US 27 towards Four Corners.

== Notable people ==
- Edmond Amateis, sculptor and educator
- Dale Barnstable, retired professional basketball player
- Chimdi Chekwa, former NFL cornerback
- Tra Blake, NFL official
- Jason Couch, professional bowler
- Andrew DeClercq, retired professional basketball player and coach
- Kate DiCamillo, author of children's books
- Norm Duke, professional bowler
- Ryan Dungey, professional motocross racer
- Jahlane Forbes, soccer player who plays as a defender
- Tyson Gay, sprinter
- Shane Greene, professional baseball player
- Art Heyman, former professional basketball player
- Peter Hooten, actor
- Andy Jones, former NFL wide receiver
- Brandon Larracuente, actor
- Kalup Linzy, video and performance artist
- Greg Lloyd Jr., former NFL linebacker
- Scott McLean, former NFL football linebacker
- Marvin Musquin, professional motocross racer
- Randy Pedersen, professional bowler
- Cassidy Rae, actor
- Rachel Recchia, American television personality
- Sha'Carri Richardson, professional Olympic track and field athlete
- Stephanie Samedy, professional volleyball player
- Dean Saunders, American politician
- Beulah Rebecca Hooks Hannah Tingley, former member of the Democratic National Committee
- Pamela Walton, murder victim discovered in Clermont in 1988
- Daniel Webster, U.S. representative
- Kaylin Whitney, American track and field athlete, specializing in sprinting events
